= List of sumo stables =

The following is an alphabetical list of heya or training stables in professional sumo. All belong to one of five groups, called ichimon. Every ichimon is led by the stable for which it is named. They are, by number of stables they contain: Nishonoseki ichimon (17), Dewanoumi ichimon (14), Tokitsukaze ichimon and Isegahama ichimon (5), and Takasago ichimon (4). Occasionally there have been independent stables, but the Japan Sumo Association agreed at a director's meeting in July 2018 that all sumo elders must belong to one of the five ichimon. The founding dates listed below are for the current incarnation of each stable; in most cases this is not the first stable to exist under a given name, however.

The number of stables peaked at 54, with the opening of Onoe stable in August 2006. In order to limit the over-proliferation of stables, the Japan Sumo Association introduced new rules the following month that greatly raised the qualifications needed by former wrestlers wishing to branch out (namely, those ranked below yokozuna or ōzeki must have spent at least 60 tournaments in the top makuuchi division or 25 in the titled san'yaku ranks). Discounting the temporary closure of Kise stable from 2010-2012, over six years no new stables established while eleven folded, bringing the number of stables to 43. The streak of closures ended with the opening of former yokozuna Musashimaru's Musashigawa stable in April 2013, hence the opening and closing of stables has stabilized. There are 45 stables, all of which are located in the Greater Tokyo Region, especially in Tokyo's Ryogoku district.

The governing body of professional sumo is the Japan Sumo Association. Six tournaments are held every year: three in Tokyo (January, May and September) and one each in Osaka (March), Nagoya (July) and Fukuoka (November). Each tournament lasts 15 days during which wrestlers in the top two divisions compete in one bout per day, with wrestlers in lower divisions competing a total of seven times. All sumo wrestlers are classified in a ranking hierarchy (banzuke), which is updated after each tournament based on the wrestlers' performance. Wrestlers with more wins than losses go up while those with negative records are demoted. The top division is makuuchi and the second division is jūryō. The 70 wrestlers ranked within the two top divisions are called sekitori. At the pinnacle of sumo hierarchy stands the rank of yokozuna.

== Pronunciation note ==
Due to a Japanese speech phenomenon known as rendaku, when the word for stable, heya, comes second in a compound word, the "h" in heya changes to "b" to become beya. A sumo stable is pronounced in Japanese as "sumo-beya" and Arashio stable, as an example, is pronounced "Arashio-beya".

== Active stables ==
There are 45 stables as of May 2026.

Name	Ichimon	Year opened	Notable active wrestlers	Notable past wrestlers	Other notable information
Ajigawa	Isegahama	2022	Aonishiki		head is former Aminishiki, branched off from Isegahama stable
Arashio	Tokitsukaze	2002	Daiseizan, Kōtokuzan, Wakamotoharu, Wakatakakage	Sōkokurai, Wakatakamoto	head is former Sōkokurai, made headlines when it welcomed back exonerated Sōkokurai in 2013
Asahiyama	Isegahama	2016			head is former Kotonishiki, branched off from Oguruma stable
Asakayama	Isegahama	2014	Kaishō		head is former Kaiō, branched off from Tomozuna stable
Dewanoumi	Dewanoumi	1862 (c.)	Dewanoryū, Mitakeumi	Chiyonoyama, Mainoumi, Mienoumi, Tochigiyama	head is former Oginohana
Fujishima	Dewanoumi	1981	Bushozan, Fujiryōga, Fujiseiun, Fujitensei	Dejima, Miyabiyama, Musashimaru, Musōyama, Shōtenrō, Wakanoyama	head is former Musōyama, was the strongest stable in early 2000s, name was changed from its previous incarnation as Musashigawa
Futagoyama	Dewanoumi	2018	Mita, Nabatame, Rōga		Head is former Miyabiyama, branched off from Fujishima stable
Hakkaku	Takasago	1993	Kitanowaka	Hokutōfuji, Hokutōriki, Kaihō, Ōiwato, Okinoumi	head is former Hokutoumi, branched off from Kokonoe stable
Hanaregoma	Nishonoseki	1990	Ichiyamamoto, Shimazuumi	Harunoyama, Shōhōzan, Wakatsutomu	head is former Tamanoshima, branched off from Futagoyama stable
Hidenoyama	Nishonoseki	2024			head is former Kotoshōgiku, branched off from Sadogatake stable
Ikazuchi	Dewanoumi	1993	Shishi	Masatsukasa, Ōtsukasa, Sagatsukasa, Yōtsukasa	head is former Kakizoe, who inherited the stable from former Tochitsukasa who branched off from Kasugano stable
Isegahama	Isegahama	1979	Arashifuji, Asahifuji, Atamifuji, Enhō, Hakunofuji, Hananofuji, Midorifuji, Mienofuji, Nishikifuji, Takerufuji, Toshinofuji, Yoshinofuji	Aminishiki, Asōfuji, Harumafuji, Homarefuji, Kasugafuji, Satonofuji, Takarafuji, Terunofuji, Terutsuyoshi	head is former Terunofuji, renamed from its original incarnation as Ajigawa stable
Isenoumi	Tokitsukaze	1949	Fujinokawa, Nishikigi	Hattori, Ikioi, Kagamiō, Kashiwado, Tosanoumi	head is former Kitakachidoki, the Isenoumi name has one of the longest traditions in sumo
Kasugano	Dewanoumi	1925	Tochimaru, Tochimusashi, Tochitaikai	Aoiyama, Tochihikari, Tochinishiki, Tochinoshin, Tochinoumi, Tochinowaka, Tochiōzan	head is former Tochinowaka, active since the Meiji era, currently one of the most successful stables
Kataonami	Nishonoseki	1961	Tamashōhō, Tamawashi	Tamaasuka, Tamakiyama, Tamaryū	head is former Tamakasuga, branched off from Nishonoseki stable
Kise	Dewanoumi	2003	Churanoumi, Himukamaru, Kazuma, Kinbozan, Shimanoumi, Ura	Akiseyama, Daiseidō, Gagamaru, Hidenoumi, Higonojō, Jōkōryū, Kiyoseumi, Kizakiumi, Kizenryu, Shiden, Tokushinho, Tokushōryū	head is former Higonoumi, was dissolved over a ticket selling scandal, then allowed to reform two years later, well represented in two top divisions
Kokonoe	Takasago	1967	Chiyonoō, Chiyonoumi, Chiyoshōma	Chiyomaru, Chiyonofuji, Chiyonokuni, Chiyoōtori, Chiyosakae, Chiyotaikai, Chiyotairyū, Chiyotenzan, Hokutoumi, Kitanofuji, Kitaseumi, Takanofuji	head is former Chiyotaikai, as of March 2018 five of its 17 wrestlers were sekitori
Minato	Nishonoseki	1982		Ichinojō	head is former Minatofuji, who is the only top division wrestler the stable had ever produced until Ichinojō in 2014.
Minatogawa	Nishonoseki	2004	Takakento, Takanoshō, Wakanoshō	Masunoyama, Takagenji, Takakeishō, Takanofuji, Takanoiwa	head is former Takakeisho, branched off from Kasugano stable
Musashigawa	Dewanoumi	2013		Wakaichirō	head is former Musashimaru, who is only the second foreign-born wrestler to open his own stable
Nakamura	Nishonoseki	2024	Kayō, Miyanokaze, Tomokaze		head is former Yoshikaze, branched off from Nishonoseki stable
Naruto	Nishonoseki	2017	Ōshōma, Ōshōumi		head is former Kotoōshū, branched off from Sadogatake stable
Nishiiwa	Nishonoseki	2018			head is former Wakanosato, branched off from Tagonoura stable
Nishikido	Takasago	2002		Gokushindo, Mitoryū	head is former Mitoizumi, was home to the first Kazakh wrestler
Nishonoseki	Nishonoseki	2021	Ōnosato, Shirokuma		founder and head is the former Kisenosato, the 72nd yokozuna; branched off from Tagonoura stable
Oitekaze	Tokitsukaze	1998	Daieishō, Hitoshi, Tobizaru	Daiamami, Daishoho, Daishōmaru, Endō, Hamanishiki, Hayateumi, Kokkai, Tsurugishō	head is former Daishōyama who branched off from Tatsunami stable
Onoe	Dewanoumi	2006		Baruto, Satoyama, Tenkaihō, Yamamotoyama	head is former Hamanoshima, branched off from Mihogaseki stable, lost three sekitori due to match fixing scandal in 2011
Ōnomatsu	Nishonoseki	1994	Ōnokatsu	Amūru, Daidō, Katayama, Keitenkai, Ōnoshō, Wakakōyū, Yuma	head is former Daidō, forced out of Nishonoseki ichimon and joined Takanohana ichimon in 2010
Ōshima	Isegahama	1941	Kyokukaiyū	Asahishō, Kaiō, Kaisei, Kyokudōzan, Kyokushūhō, Kyokushūzan, Kyokutaisei, Kyokutenhō, Sentoryū, Tachiyama	head is former Kyokutenhō, incarnations have a long and prestigious history, absorbed a number of strong wrestlers in 2012 from a previous, now defunct Ōshima stable
Oshiogawa	Nishonoseki	2022	Amakaze, Kazekenō	Yago	head is former Takekaze, branched from Oguruma stable upon its closure
Ōtake	Nishonoseki	1971	Mudoho, Ōhō	Ōsunaarashi, Ōzutsu, Rohō	head is former Tamaasuka, the previous head (former Takatōriki) was forced out in a gambling scandal
Otowayama	Tokitsukaze	2023	Kirishima		founder and head is the former Kakuryū, the 71st yokozuna; branched off from Michinoku stable
Sadogatake	Nishonoseki	1955	Kotoeihō, Kotoshōhō, Kotozakura	Hasegawa, Kotoeko, Kotokaze, Kotomitsuki, Kotonishiki, Kotoōshū, Kotoshōgiku, Kotoyūki, Kotoyusho, Kotozakura (I)	head is former Kotonowaka, has produced many wrestlers in makuuchi and san'yaku over the years
Sakaigawa	Dewanoumi	1998	Hiradoumi, Nishinoryū, Sadanoumi, Tsushimanada	Gōeidō, Hochiyama, Iwakiyama, Myōgiryū, Sadanofuji, Toyohibiki	head is former Ryōgoku, has produced many sekitori
Shibatayama	Nishonoseki	1999		Daishōchi, Daiyubu, Sakigake, Wakanoshima	head is former Ōnokuni, in 2013 absorbed its parent stable (Hanaregoma), its only home-grown sekitori quit under acrimonious circumstances
Shikihide	Dewanoumi	1992		Sensho	head is former Kitazakura, took almost 20 years to produce a sekitori in 2012
Shikoroyama	Nishonoseki	2004	Abi	Hōmashō, Irodori, Oki, Seirō	head is former Homasho, stable founded by former Terao
Tagonoura	Nishonoseki	1989	Takayasu	Kisenosato, Rikiō, Takanowaka, Takanoyama, Wakanosato	head is former Takanotsuru, founded by yokozuna Takanosato but renamed from Naruto and moved to Ryōgoku following his death
Takadagawa	Nishonoseki	1974	Dairaidō, Hakuyozan, Kagayaki, Otsuji, Ryūden, Shōnannoumi	Kenkō, Maenoshin, Shobushi	head is former Akinoshima, stable was ousted from Takasago ichimon in 1998, finally accepted into Nishonoseki ichimon in 2013
Takasago	Takasago	1878	Asagyokusei, Asahakuryū, Asakōryū, Asanowaka, Asanoyama, Asashiyu, Asasuiryū	Asabenkei, Asashio, Asashōryū, Azumafuji, Konishiki, Maedayama, Takamiyama	head is former Asasekiryū, the second oldest and arguably one of the most successful stables throughout its history
Takekuma	Dewanoumi	2022	Gōnoyama		head is former Gōeidō, branched off from Sakaigawa stable
Tamanoi	Dewanoumi	1990	Fujiazuma, Hatsuyama, Tōhakuryū, Yoshiazuma	Azumaryū, Ryūkō	head is former Tochiazuma Daisuke, passed onto him by his father, the stable's founder Tochiazuma Tomoyori
Tatsunami	Dewanoumi	1916	Akua, Hōshōryū, Kiryūkō, Meisei, Ōkaryū	Annenyama, Futabayama, Futahaguro, Haguroyama, Hanakaze, Mōkonami	head is former Asahiyutaka, one of the most prestigious stables in sumo but declined by the 1980s
Tokitsukaze	Tokitsukaze	1941	Shōdai, Tokihayate, Tokifudō	Aogiyama, Kitabayama, Kurama, Ōshio, Tokitenkū, Toyonoshima, Yutakayama	founded by Futabayama, head is former Tosayutaka who took over when previous head (former Tokitsuumi) was expelled for failure to follow COVID-19 protocols
Yamahibiki	Dewanoumi	1985	Kitaharima, Nionoumi	Hakurozan, Kitataiki, Kitazakura, Ōrora	head is former Ganyū who inherited it on the death of founder Kitanoumi, who branched off from Mihogaseki

== Mergers and closures (1994 to present) ==
- Miyagino stable temporarily closes April 2024, wrestlers and coaches move to Isegahama stable; closure made permanent May 2026
- Michinoku stable closes April 2024, wrestlers and coaches move to the Otawayama, Oitekaze, Isenoumi and Arashio stables
- Oguruma stable closes February 2022, personnel split between Oshiogawa stable and Nishonoseki stable
- Kagamiyama stable closes July 2021, all wrestlers and personnel move to Isenoumi stable
- Azumazeki stable closes April 2021, wrestlers move to Hakkaku stable
- Minezaki stable closes April 2021, wrestlers move to Shibatayama stable, some other personnel to Takadagawa stable and Nishiiwa stable
- Nakagawa stable closes July 2020, wrestlers and/or personnel move to Arashio, Asahiyama, Isenoumi, Kataonami, Miyagino, Oitekaze, Tokitsukaze, and Tomozuna stables
- Izutsu stable closes September 2019, wrestlers and personnel move to Michinoku stable
- Takanohana stable closes October 2018, wrestlers and personnel move to Chiganoura stable
- Kasugayama stable closes October 2016, some wrestlers retire, other wrestlers and personnel move to Oitekaze stable
- Asahiyama stable closes January 2015, all wrestlers and some personnel move to Isegahama, some other personnel move to Asakayama.
- Mihogaseki stable closes October 2013, wrestlers move to Kasugano
- Magaki stable closes March 2013, wrestlers move to Isegahama
- Hanaregoma stable closes February 2013, wrestlers move to Shibatayama
- Nishonoseki stable closes January 2013, remaining wrestlers retire, other personnel move to Matsugane
- Nakamura stable closes December 2012, wrestlers move to Azumazeki
- Hanakago stable closes May 2012, wrestlers move to Minezaki
- Ōshima stable closes April 2012, wrestlers move to Tomozuna
- Tagonoura stable closes February 2012, wrestlers move to Dewanoumi and Kasugano
- Takashima stable closes June 2011, head coach moves to Kasugayama
- Kiriyama stable closes January 2011, wrestlers move to Asahiyama
- Araiso stable closes September 2008, one remaining wrestler moves to Hanakago
- Isegahama stable closes February 2007, wrestlers move to Kiriyama
- Hatachiyama stable closes June 2006, wrestlers move to Kitanoumi
- Oshiogawa stable closes March 2005, wrestlers move to Oguruma
- Takekuma Stable closes March 2004, no wrestlers are left but head coach moves to Tomozuna
- Kabutoyama stable closes December 2002, no wrestlers are left but head coach moves to Minato
- Wakamatsu stable merges with Takasago in February 2002
- Tatsutagawa stable closes November 2000, wrestlers move to Michinoku
- Kise stable closes February 2000, wrestlers move to Kiriyama
- Kumagatani stable closes April 1996, wrestlers move to Tatsunami
- Ōnaruto stable closes December 1994, wrestlers move to Kiriyama

== Name changes (2003 to present) ==
- Tokiwayama stable is renamed Minatogawa stable in January 2026.
- Irumagawa stable is renamed Ikazuchi stable in January 2023.
- Tomozuna stable is renamed Ōshima stable in February 2022.
- Nishonoseki stable is renamed Hanaregoma stable in December 2021.
- Araiso stable is renamed Nishonoseki stable in December 2021.
- Chiganoura stable is renamed Tokiwayama stable in November 2020.
- Kitanoumi stable is renamed Yamahibiki stable in November 2015.
- Matsugane stable is renamed Nishonoseki stable in December 2014.
- Naruto stable is renamed Tagonoura stable in December 2013.
- Musashigawa stable is renamed Fujishima stable in September 2010.
- Ajigawa stable is renamed Isegahama stable in November 2007.
- Futagoyama stable is renamed Takanohana stable in February 2004.
- Taihō stable is renamed Ōtake stable in February 2003.
- Nakadachi stable is renamed Sakaigawa stable in January 2003.

== See also ==
- List of sumo elders
- Heya - sumo stable information
- Japan Sumo Association
- Toshiyori - sumo elder information
- List of active sumo wrestlers
- List of past sumo wrestlers
- List of yokozuna
- Glossary of sumo terms
