= Yoshinori Tashiro =

Sumo wrestler

- 田代 良徳
- Pronunciation: Tashiro Yoshinori
- Born: July 13, 1976 (age 50); Hachiōji, Tokyo, Japan
- Other name: Tōōyama Katsunori
- Education: Meiji University
- Occupations: Actor, model, talent
- Years active: circa 2017 – present
- Notable work: Everyone's Grand Sumo - Sumo Wrestlers' Dosukoi Life You Don't Know
- Website: blog.rixy.jp/

Tōōyama Katsunori
Personal information
- Native name: 東桜山 勝徳
- Born: Yoshinori Tashiro; July 13, 1976 (age 50) Hachiōji, Tokyo, Japan
- Height: 1.89 m (6 ft 2 in)
- Weight: 166.3 kg (367 lb)

Sport
- Sport: Sumo
- Retired: September, 2007
- Heya: Tamanoi
- Record: 192-152-20
- Debut: January, 1999
- Highest rank: Makushita 7 (November, 2002)
- Championships: 1 (Jonokuchi)
- Updated on 3 April 2023

Yoshinori Tashiro (Japanese: 田代 良徳, Tashiro Yoshinori), also known by his ring name or shikona of Tōōyama Katsunori (Japanese: 東桜山 勝徳), is a Japanese retired sumo wrestler and actor from Hachiōji, Tokyo. While an active sumo wrestler (rikishi), he wrestled for the Tamanoi sumo stable and made his debut in January 1999. He won the championship of the lowest division of jonokuchi in March 1999. In November 2002 he was promoted to his highest career rank of makushita 7. He retired from active competition in September 2007.

== Early life and education ==
Born in Hachiōji, a city in the Tokyo Metropolis, Yoshinori started practicing sumo at an early age, enrolling in the sumo wrestling club at Sumiyoshi Elementary school in Fuchū and at the 5th and 6th grades he won the title of elementary school yokozuna at the Wanpaku Sumo National Tournament, a sumo competition for elementary schoolers.

In high school he transferred to the Nakano Junior and Senior High School, a high school with a prestigious sumo program attached to Meiji University. While at the high school he was classmates with future ōzeki and his future stablemate Tochiazuma. After graduating high school he entered the Department of Economics at Meiji University, where he was also part of their sumo club and was team captain and graduated in March 1999.

== Career ==
=== Sumo ===
Due to his connection to Tochiazuma, Yoshinori entered Tamanoi stable, which was run by the former's father, former sekiwake Tochiazuma, and wrestled at first under his real surname of Tashiro (田代). He made his professional debut in January 1999 while still in university. Alongside him, future yokozuna Asashoryu was also making his professional debut. Tashiro won the jonokuchi championship with a perfect record in his second tournament and would then steadily rise through the divisions, only getting his first losing record a year after his debut. Tashiro would debut in the 3rd division of makushita in May 2000, and it would be in this division where he would spend the vast majority of his career, 38 tournaments out of 53 of his total career he would spend in this division. He reached the top ranks of makushita (between ranks 1 and 15) in September 2002 and his highest career rank of makushita 7 west in November 2002. Unfortunately he was not be able to get a winning record and be even closer to promotion to the salaried division of jūryō. After this, Tashiro would bounce between the middle ranks of the 3rd division, but only being demoted back to sandanme three times. He would change his shikona to Tōōka (東桜花) for a single tournament, before changing it to Tōōyama (東桜山), this being the name he would use for the rest of his career.

==== Retirement ====
On the two occasions Tōōyama was demoted to sandanme, in July 2003 and May 2005, he had got winning records (kachi-koshi) that promoted him back to makushita. However, in September 2007, after being demoted once again to sandanme, he got a losing record or make-koshi, something that had not happened in his division since March 2003, when first climbing through the division after his professional debut. Due to this and to injuries he had acquired throughout his career, he announced his retirement from active competition after the September 2007 tournament.

=== Acting ===
After retirement he worked at a supermarket run by a member of his stable's support association, later being promoted to store manager. He also launched his own website production and management company "Deckworks" (reorganized as " Decks LLC " in 2015).

Around 2008 and 2009, Yoshinori wrote and published a book telling of his daily life while an active sumo wrestler, titled みんなの大相撲―あなたの知らない力士たちのドスコイ生活 (lit. Everyone's Grand Sumo - Sumo Wrestlers' Dosukoi Life You Don't Know), in an attempt to showcase the hardships and day-to-day lives of sumo wrestlers.

In parallel with working at a supermarket, he used his experience as a former sumo wrestler to perform talent activities, and worked for O-Sumo-san Promotions or SumoPro. He retired from managing the supermarket in 2015 to concentrate on company management and talent business. He announced on his Facebook that he would be leaving SumoPro at the end of August 2021 and working as a freelancer.

Since becoming an actor he starred in multiple commercials and other appearances, including an appearance on Vogue in February 2017 and an advertisement with Salman Khan in September 2017. He played small roles in Detective Chinatown 3 and John Wick: Chapter 4. He also played the titular role in the Indian film Sumo.

== Fighting style ==
Tōōyama's favoured technique are listed at the Sumo Association as oshi (pushing) rather than grappling and fighting his opponents on the mawashi. His most common winning kimarite are straightforward: oshi dashi (push out), accounting for 33,85% of his wins, and yori-kiri (force out).

== Career record ==
Tōōyama Katsunori
Year	January Hatsu basho, Tokyo	March Haru basho, Osaka	May Natsu basho, Tokyo	July Nagoya basho, Nagoya	September Aki basho, Tokyo	November Kyūshū basho, Fukuoka
1999	(Maezumo)	East Jonokuchi #35; 7–0; Champion	West Jonidan #31; 6–1	West Sandanme #71; 5–2	West Sandanme #40; 5–2	East Sandanme #15; 3–4
2000	East Sandanme #31; 4–3	East Sandanme #17; 6–1	West Makushita #43; 5–2	West Makushita #27; 5–2	East Makushita #15; 1–6	West Makushita #34; 3–4
2001	East Makushita #43; 3–4	West Makushita #53; 4–3	West Makushita #45; 4–3	West Makushita #36; 3–4	East Makushita #48; 5–2	West Makushita #32; 3–4
2002	West Makushita #40; 3–4	East Makushita #50; 5–2	West Makushita #35; 4–3	East Makushita #26; 5–2	West Makushita #13; 4–3	West Makushita #7; 2–5
2003	East Makushita #23; 4–3	East Makushita #18; 3–4	East Makushita #27; Sat out due to injury 0–0–7	West Sandanme #7; 5–2	West Makushita #46; 6–1	West Makushita #20; 3–4
2004	East Makushita #25; 2–5	East Makushita #42; 5–2	West Makushita #27; 1–6	East Makushita #58; 5–2	East Makushita #41; 4–3	East Makushita #37; 4–3
2005	East Makushita #29; 3–4	East Makushita #39; 2–5	West Sandanme #1; 1–0–6	East Sandanme #33; Sat out due to injury 0–0–7	West Sandanme #93; 6–1	West Sandanme #34; 5–2
2006	East Sandanme #6; 5–2	West Makushita #48; 5–2	East Makushita #33; 3–4	West Makushita #41; 4–3	East Makushita #34; 3–4	West Makushita #42; 4–3
2007	West Makushita #34; 4–3	West Makushita #27; 4–3	East Makushita #23; 2–5	West Makushita #36; 1–6	West Sandanme #7; Retired; 3–4	x
Record given as wins–losses–absences Top division champion Top division runner-up Retired Lower divisions Non-participation Sanshō key: F=Fighting spirit; O=Outstanding performance; T=Technique Also shown: ★=Kinboshi; P=Playoff(s); Divisions: Makuuchi — Jūryō — Makushita — Sandanme — Jonidan — Jonokuchi Makuuchi ranks: Yokozuna — Ōzeki — Sekiwake — Komusubi — Maegashira

== See also ==
- Glossary of sumo terms
- List of past sumo wrestlers
