= Hanaregoma stable (1981-2013) =

Defunct sumo stable

Hanaregoma stable (放駒部屋, Hanaregoma beya) (1981–2013) was a sumo stable of the Nishonoseki group.

was a stable of sumo wrestlers founded in 1981 and closed in 2013. It was one of the Nishonoseki ichimon or group of stables. In September 2010 it had eight active wrestlers.

The stable was established in 1981 by former ōzeki Kaiketsu Masateru, as a breakaway from Hanakago stable. Among the wrestlers who went with him was Ōnokuni, who reached the top makuuchi division in 1983. In 1985 its parent stable folded and it took in the remaining Hanakago wrestlers, including future makuuchi Hananoumi and Hananokuni. Ōnokuni became the 62nd yokozuna in 1987. The stable had less success in later years, and did not have a sekitori ranked wrestler after the retirement of Shunketsu in 2008.

In August 2010, Hanaregoma became the head of the Japan Sumo Association, a position he held until 2012.

On 7 February 2013, due to Hanaregoma's imminent mandatory retirement, the stable was absorbed into Ōnokuni's Shibatayama stable, which had branched off from its parent in 1999.

== Owner ==
- 1981–2013: 19th Hanaregoma (ōzeki Kaiketsu Masateru)

== Notable wrestlers ==
- Ōnokuni (62nd yokozuna)
- Hananoumi (komusubi)
- Hananokuni (maegashira 1)
- Misugiiso (maegashira 2)
- Shunketsu (maegashira 12)
- Komafudō (maegashira 13)
- Hidenohana (jūryō 5)
- Maeta (makushita 3)

== Referees ==
- Tamamitsu Kimura (real name Nobuhide Ueda) - san'yaku referee
- Kichijiro Kimura (Masahiro Nishino) - makushita referee

== Usher ==
- Katsuyuki (Katsuyuki Koyama) - san'yaku usher

== See also ==
- List of sumo stables
- List of sumo elders
- List of active sumo wrestlers
- List of past sumo wrestlers
- List of years in sumo
- Glossary of sumo terms
