= List of active sumo wrestlers =

The following is an alphabetical list of all active professional sumo wrestlers in the top makuuchi division, and all those currently in lower divisions who have an English Wikipedia article. Please refer to professional sumo divisions for more information about the separate divisions.

== List ==
- Wrestlers can be listed in the order of their rank as of the most current Aki 2026 banzuke, by clicking the 'Current rank' sorting button.
- The East side of the banzuke is regarded as more prestigious than the West side and those ranked on the East will generally have had a slightly better record in the previous tournament than those with the same rank on the West.
- Ranks in **bold** indicate a wrestler is debuting at a career-high rank.

Ring name	Current rank	Debut	Stable	Birthdate	Hometown	Career and other notes
Abi 阿炎	West Maegashira 13	2013-5	Shikoroyama	May 4, 1994 (age 32)	(Japan) (Saitama Prefecture) Saitama	five-time sekiwake, one-time makuuchi champion, known for distinctive tsuppari, won successive lower division championships after a three tournament suspension for repeatedly breaking COVID-19 rules
Akua 天空海	East Makushita 14	2010-11	Tatsunami	June 11, 1990 (age 36)	(Japan) (Ibaraki Prefecture) Ibaraki	best rank maegashira 10, made his makuuchi debut at age 30, known for kakenage move
Amakaze 天風	East Sandanme 70	2007-3	Oshiogawa	July 7, 1991 (age 35)	(Japan) (Kagawa Prefecture) Kagawa	best rank maegashira 13, one-time jūryō champion, former personal attendant to Takekaze
Arashifuji 嵐富士	**West Jūryō 5**	2024-3	Isegahama	October 12, 2004 (age 22)	(Japan) (Fukuoka Prefecture) Umi	jūryō debut
Aonishiki 安青錦	East Ōzeki 2	2023-9	Ajigawa	March 23, 2004 (age 22)	(Ukraine) (Vinnytsia Oblast) Vinnytsia	back at ōzeki, three-time makuuchi champion, second ever rikishi from Ukraine
Asagyokusei 朝玉勢	West Makushita 43	2016-1	Takasago	May 29, 1993 (age 33)	(Japan) (Mie Prefecture) Mie	best rank jūryō 12, jonokuchi and jonidan champion on debut
Asahakuryū 朝白龍	West Maegashira 12	2023-1	Takasago	January 8, 1999 (age 27)	(Mongolia) Ulaanbaatar	best rank maegashira 8, one-time jūryō, makushita and jonokuchi champion
Asakōryū 朝紅龍	East Maegashira 13	2021-5	Takasago	September 24, 1998 (age 28)	(Japan) (Osaka Prefecture) Osaka	best rank maegashira 7, went to same high school as his stablemaster Asasekiryū, brother of Asasuiryū, sandanme tsukedashi
Asanoyama 朝乃山	East Maegashira 6	2016-3	Takasago	March 1, 1994 (age 32)	(Japan) (Toyama Prefecture) Toyama	former ōzeki, one-time makuuchi champion, sandanme tsukedashi, served a 6-tournament suspension for repeatedly violating COVID-19 rules
Asasuiryū 朝翠龍	**East Maegashira 15**	2024-7	Takasago	August 9, 2000 (age 26)	(Japan) (Osaka Prefecture) Osaka	mukuuchi debut, best rank maegashira 7, went to same high school as his stablemaster Asasekiryū, brother of Asakōryū, makushita tsukedashi
Atamifuji 熱海富士	East Sekiwake	2020-11	Isegahama	September 3, 2002 (age 24)	(Japan) (Shizuoka Prefecture) Shizuoka	three-time sekiwake, five-time runner-up, name comes from hometown of Atami, contended for yūshō in first two appearances
Bushōzan 武将山	West Sandanme 24	2014-1	Fujishima	December 6, 1995 (age 30)	(Japan) (Ibaraki Prefecture) Ibaraki	best rank maegashira 12, former Saitama Sakae captain
Chiyoshōma 千代翔馬	West Maegashira 14	2009-7	Kokonoe	July 20, 1991 (age 35)	(Mongolia) Ulaanbaatar	best rank maegashira 2, employs a variety of moves
Churanoumi 美ノ海	West Maegashira 3	2016-3	Kise	May 6, 1993 (age 33)	(Japan) (Okinawa Prefecture) Okinawa	ring name "beautiful ocean" alludes to his hometown
Daieishō 大栄翔	West Komusubi	2022-1	Oitekaze	November 10, 1993 (age 33)	(Japan) (Saitama Prefecture) Saitama	fourteen-time sekiwake, one-time makuuchi champion, one of several sekitori from populous Saitama prefecture
Daiseizan 大青山	East Jūryō 2	2022-1	Arashio	May 22, 2000 (age 26)	(China) Inner Mongolia	best rank Maegashira 16, second ever sekitori from China (Inner Mongolia)
Dewanoryū 出羽ノ龍	East Jūryō 1	2019-11	Dewanoumi	March 7, 2001 (age 25)	(Mongolia) Ulaanbaatar	
Enhō 炎鵬	East Jūryō 9	2017-3	Isegahama	October 18, 1994 (age 32)	(Japan) (Ishikawa Prefecture) Ishikawa	best rank maegashira 4, fan favorite, known for his short stature and strong underarm throw
Fujiazuma 富士東	East Sandanme 31	2003-3	Tamanoi	April 19, 1987 (age 39)	(Japan) Tokyo	best rank maegashira 4, first makuuchi wrestler coached by former ōzeki Tochiazuma
Fujinokawa 藤ノ川	West Sekiwake	2023-1	Isenoumi	February 22, 2005 (age 21)	(Japan) (Kyoto Prefecture) Kyoto	sekiwake debut, four consecutive gold stars
Fujiseiun 藤青雲	East Maegashira 7	2021-3	Fujishima	December 5, 1997 (age 28)	(Japan) (Kumamoto Prefecture) Kumamoto	21 consecutive wins on debut
Fujiryōga 藤凌駕	**West Maegashira 4**	2025-3	Fujishima	February 27, 2003 (age 23)	(Japan) (Aichi Prefecture) Aichi	at best rank achieved, one-time jūryō champion, makushita tsukedashi
Gōnoyama 豪ノ山	East Maegashira 3	2021-3	Takekuma	April 7, 1998 (age 28)	(Japan) (Osaka Prefecture) Osaka	former Chuo University amateur, stablemaster is former ōzeki Gōeidō, sandanme tsukedashi
Hakunofuji 伯乃富士	East Komusubi	2023-1	Isegahama	August 22, 2003 (age 23)	(Japan) (Tottori Prefecture) Tottori	komusubi debut, former high school yokozuna promoted to jūryō just one tournament after his professional debut, makushita tsukedashi
Hananofuji 花の富士	East Makushita 33	2022-9	Isegahama	April 10, 1999 (age 27)	(Japan) (Kumamoto Prefecture) Kumamoto	best rank jūryō 13, amateur yokozuna, first recruit from Miyagino stable since Hakuhō took over the stable
Hatsuyama 羽出山	West Jūryō 8	2022-3	Tamanoi	November 5, 1999 (age 27)	(Japan) Tokyo	best rank maegashira 17, one-time makushita champion, sandanme tsukedashi
Hiradoumi 平戸海	West Maegashira 8	2016-3	Sakaigawa	April 20, 2000 (age 26)	(Japan) (Nagasaki Prefecture) Nagasaki	two-time komusubi, ring name comes from hometown, island city Hirado
Hitoshi 日翔志	West Jūryō 11	2021-5	Oitekaze	August 14, 1997 (age 29)	(Japan) Tokyo	best rank maegashira 17, two-time jonidan, one-time sandanme and makushita champion
Hōshōryū 豊昇龍	West Yokozuna 74th Yokozuna	2018-1	Tatsunami	May 22, 1999 (age 27)	(Mongolia) Ulaanbaatar	sixth Mongolian to be promoted to sumo's highest rank, known for throwing and tripping techniques, nephew of Asashōryū, two-time makuuchi champion
Ichiyamamoto 一山本	West Maegashira 6	2017-1	Hanaregoma	October 1, 1993 (age 33)	(Japan) Hokkaido	best rank maegashira 1, two-time jūryō champion, Abi-style thrusting skills
Kagayaki 輝	East Jūryō 11	2010-3	Takadagawa	June 1, 1994 (age 32)	(Japan) (Ishikawa Prefecture) Ishikawa	best rank maegashira 4, Ishikawa native along with Endō
Kaishō 魁勝	West Makushita 29	2013-3	Asakayama	January 28, 1995 (age 31)	(Japan) (Aichi Prefecture) Aichi	best rank jūryō 2, one-time sandanme champion, first sekitori from his stable
Kayō 嘉陽	West Jūryō 12	2022-5	Nishonoseki	July 14, 1999 (age 27)	(Japan) (Okinawa Prefecture) Okinawa	best rank maegashira 16, known for "pulling" sumo, sandanme tsukedashi
Kazekenō Genta 風賢央	**East Jūryō 4**	2007-3	Oshiogawa	June 4, 1999 (age 27)	(Japan) (Ehime Prefecture) Seiyo	at best rank achieved, one-time makushita champion
Kazuma 一意	West Jūryō 2	2024-7	Kise	November 12, 2001 (age 25)	(Japan) (Osaka Prefecture) Osaka	best rank Maegashira 15, latest jūryō champion, debuted at makushita tsukedashi
Kinbōzan 金峰山	West Maegashira 10	2021-11	Kise	June 24, 1997 (age 29)	(Kazakhstan) Almaty	best rank maegashira 3, only ever Kazakh rikishi to reach makuuchi, sandanme tsukedashi
Kirishima 霧島	East Ōzeki 1	2015-5	Otowayama	April 24, 1996 (age 30)	(Mongolia) (Dornod Province) Dornod	back at ōzeki after several years, three-time top division champion
Kitaharima 北磻磨	West Makushita 46	2002-3	Yamahibiki	July 28, 1986 (age 40)	(Japan) (Hyōgo Prefecture) Hyōgo	best rank maegashira 15, took 85 tournaments to reach makuuchi
Kitanowaka 北の若	East Jūryō 6	2019-3	Hakkaku	November 12, 2000 (age 26)	(Japan) (Yamagata Prefecture) Yamagata	best rank maegashira 14, former high school yokozuna
Kotoeihō 琴栄峰	**West Maegashira 1**	2022-1	Sadogatake	July 8, 2003 (age 23)	(Japan) (Chiba Prefecture) Chiba	at best rank achieved, brother of Kotoshōhō, earned a career first Fighting Spirit Prize at the July 2026 tournament
Kōtokuzan 荒篤山	East Makushita 7	2009-9	Arashio	March 11, 1994 (age 32)	(Japan) (Kanagawa Prefecture) Kanagawa	best rank maegashira 16, born in the Philippines, given name is Jasper
Kotoshōhō 琴勝峰	East Maegashira 1	2017-11	Sadogatake	August 26, 1999 (age 27)	(Japan) (Chiba Prefecture) Chiba	two-time sekiwake, one-time makuuchi champion, brother of Kotoeihō
Kotozakura 琴櫻	West Ōzeki 1	2015-11	Sadogatake	November 19, 1997 (age 28)	(Japan) (Chiba Prefecture) Chiba	one-time makuuchi champion, namesake grandson of 53rd yokozuna Kotozakura
Kyokukaiyū 旭海雄	West Jūryō 1	2023-11	Ōshima	April 4, 2000 (age 26)	(Mongolia) (Bayankhongor Province) Bayankhongor	best rank jūryō 1, one-time sandanme champion
Meisei 明生	East Jūryō 13	2011-5	Tatsunami	July 24, 1995 (age 31)	(Japan) (Kagoshima Prefecture) Kagoshima	two-time sekiwake, former one-time jūryō champion, from small island of Amami-Ōshima
Midorifuji 翠富士	East Jūryō 7	2016-9	Isegahama	August 30, 1996 (age 30)	(Japan) (Shizuoka Prefecture) Shizuoka	best rank maegashira 1, one-time jūryō champion, one-time special prize winner, known for his signature katasukashi technique
Mitakeumi 御嶽海	West Jūryō 4	2015-3	Dewanoumi	December 25, 1992 (age 33)	(Japan) (Nagano Prefecture) Nagano	former ōzeki, three-time makuuchi champion, 29 junior san'yaku appearances, makushita tsukedashi, half-Filipino
Nishikifuji 錦富士	West Maegashira 7	2016-9	Isegahama	July 22, 1996 (age 30)	(Japan) (Aomori Prefecture) Aomori	best rank maegashira 3, one-time jūryō champion
Nishikigi 錦木	West Jūryō 14	2006-3	Isenoumi	August 25, 1990 (age 36)	(Japan) (Iwate Prefecture) Iwate	two-time komusubi, 2nd member of Isenoumi stable in top division after Ikioi
Ōhō 王鵬	East Maegashira 10	2018-1	Ōtake	February 14, 2000 (age 26)	(Japan) Tokyo	two-time sekiwake, son of Takatoriki and grandson of Taihō, one of three brothers in sumo
Ōnokatsu 阿武剋	West Jūryō 3	2023-11	Ōnomatsu	May 5, 2000 (age 26)	(Mongolia) (Uvs Province) Uvs	best rank maegashira 3, college yokozuna, makushita tsukedashi
Ōnosato 大の里	East Yokozuna 75th Yokozuna	2023-5	Nishonoseki	June 7, 2000 (age 26)	(Japan) (Ishikawa Prefecture) Ishikawa	five-time makuuchi champion, college yokozuna, makushita tsukedashi, fastest to reach yokozuna (13 tournaments since pro debut), makushita tsukedashi
Ōshōma 欧勝馬	West Maegashira 5	2021-11	Naruto	April 9, 1997 (age 29)	(Mongolia) (Töv Province) Töv	one-time komusubi, college yokozuna, one-time jūryō champion, makushita tsukedashi
Ōshōumi 欧勝海	East Makushita 2	2020-3	Naruto	May 12, 2001 (age 25)	(Japan) (Ishikawa Prefecture) Ishikawa	best rank maegashira 11, one-time sandame and jonidan champion
Rōga 狼雅	**East Maegashira 5**	2018-11	Futagoyama	March 2, 1999 (age 27)	(Russia) (Tuva) Kyzyl	at best rank achieved, first foreigner to claim the title of high school yokozuna, won a jonokuchi and a jonidan championship the same year
Ryūden 竜電	East Jūryō 8	2006-3	Takadagawa	November 10, 1990 (age 36)	(Japan) (Yamanashi Prefecture) Yamanashi	one-time komusubi, has won championships in four lower divisions, suspended for three tournaments in 2021 for repeatedly violating COVID-19 restrictions
Sadanoumi 佐田の海	East Jūryō 5	2003-3	Sakaigawa	May 11, 1987 (age 39)	(Japan) (Kumamoto Prefecture) Kumamoto	best rank maegashira 1, took 11 years to reach makuuchi, repeated father's own feat of earning a Fighting Spirit prize in his top division debut
Shimanoumi 志摩ノ海	West Makushita 19	2012-5	Kise	July 11, 1989 (age 37)	(Japan) (Mie Prefecture) Mie	best rank maegashira 3, won two straight jūryō championships
Shimazuumi 島津海	West Makushita 33	2012-3	Hanaregoma	May 18, 1996 (age 30)	(Japan) (Kagoshima Prefecture) Kagoshima	best rank maegashira 12, took 10 years to reach sekitori
Shirokuma 白熊	West Jūryō 6	2022-5	Nishonoseki	May 25, 1999 (age 27)	(Japan) (Fukushima Prefecture) Fukushima	best rank maegashira 16, name means polar bear
Shishi 獅司	**West Maegashira 9**	2020-3	Ikazuchi	January 16, 1997 (age 29)	(Ukraine) (Zaporizhzhia Oblast) Zaporizhzhia	at best rank achieved, first Ukrainian to reach the status of sekitori in the history of the sport
Shōdai 正代	Wesr Maegashira 11	2014-3	Tokitsukaze	November 5, 1991 (age 35)	(Japan) (Kumamoto Prefecture) Kumamoto	former ōzeki, one-time makuuchi champion, rose very quickly through the ranks
Shōnannoumi 湘南乃海	East Maegashira 17	2014-3	Takadagawa	April 8, 1998 (age 28)	(Japan) (Kanagawa Prefecture) Kanagawa	best rank maegashira 5, one-time jūryō champion
Takakento 貴健斗	East Makushita 20	2014-1	Minatogawa	February 10, 1996 (age 30)	(Japan) (Kumamoto Prefecture) Kumamoto	best rank jūryō 4, former personal attendant to Takakeishō
Takanoshō 隆の勝	East Maegashira 4	2010-3	Minatogawa	November 14, 1994 (age 31)	(Japan) (Chiba Prefecture) Chiba	five-time sekiwake, three-time makuuchi runner-up
Takayasu 高安	East Maegashira 2	2005-3	Tagonoura	February 28, 1990 (age 36)	(Japan) (Ibaraki Prefecture) Ibaraki	former ōzeki, nine-time runner-up, first sekitori born in the Heisei era, half Filipino
Takerufuji 尊富士	East Maegashira 8	2022-9	Isegahama	April 9, 1999 (age 27)	(Japan) (Aomori Prefecture) Aomori	best rank maegashira 4, one-time makuuchi champion, winning on debut, a feat not achieved in 110 years
Tamashōhō 玉正鳳	East Jūryō 12	2011-9	Kataonami	June 27, 1993 (age 33)	(Mongolia) Ulaanbaatar	best rank maegashira 16, second slowest foreign wrestler (68 tournaments) to reach the status of sekitori, has been in five different stables
Tamawashi 玉鷲	East Jūryō 3	2004-1	Kataonami	November 16, 1984 (age 41)	(Mongolia) Ulaanbaatar	eight-time sekiwake, at age 34 became second oldest wrestler to win first makuuchi championship, originally studied to work in hotel industry, holds record for most makuuchi bouts and most consecutive career bouts
Tobizaru 翔猿	East Maegashira 14	2015-1	Oitekaze	April 24, 1992 (age 34)	(Japan) Tokyo	three-time komusubi, known for unorthodox approaches in the ring, younger brother of Hidenoumi
Tochitaikai 栃大海	East Jūryō 14	2017-11	Kasugano	October 12, 1999 (age 27)	(Japan) (Saitama Prefecture) Saitama	best rank maegashira 18, former junior high school Yokozuna, two-time lower division champ
Tokifudō Kō 時不動	**West Jūryō 13**	2019-3	Tokitsukaze	August 1, 2003 (age 23)	(Japan) (Shizuoka Prefecture) Yaizu	jūryō debut
Toshinofuji 寿之富士	**West Maegashira 16**	2024-3	Isegahama	August 24, 2000 (age 26)	(Mongolia) Ulaanbaatar	mukuuchi debut
Tōhakuryū 東白龍	West Jūryō 9	2019-5	Tamanoi	April 17, 1996 (age 30)	(Japan) Tokyo	best rank maegashira 15, former amateur at Toyo University, sandanme tsukedashi
Tokihayate 時疾風	West Maegashira 15	2019-3	Tokitsukaze	August 25, 1996 (age 30)	(Japan) (Miyagi Prefecture) Miyagi	best rank maegshira 9, Tokyo University of Agriculture graduate, first sekitori from his home prefecture in 18 years
Tomokaze 友風	West Jūryō 7	2017-5	Nishonoseki	December 2, 1994 (age 31)	(Japan) (Kanagawa Prefecture) Kanagawa	best rank maegashira 3, made top division in just 11 tournaments, achieved 13 successive kachi-koshi from debut
Tsushimanada 對馬洋	East Makushita 11	2016-7	Sakaigawa	June 27, 1993 (age 33)	(Japan) (Nagasaki Prefecture) Nagasaki	best rank jūryō 9, first wrestler from his hometown to be promoted sekitori in 45 years
Ura 宇良	East Maegashira 9	2015-3	Kise	June 22, 1992 (age 34)	(Japan) (Osaka Prefecture) Ōsaka	one-time komusubi, a fan favorite, won gold medal at World Combat Games as amateur, has had two extended absences due to knee injuries, one-time jūryō champion
Wakamotoharu 若元春	East Maegashira 11	2011-11	Arashio	October 5, 1993 (age 33)	(Japan) (Fukushima Prefecture) Fukushima	seven-time sekiwake, older brother of Wakatakakage
Wakanoshō 若ノ勝	East Maegashira 16	2022-1	Minatogawa	August 22, 2003 (age 23)	(Japan) (Tochigi Prefecture) Tochigi	best rank maegashira 11, one-time jūryō champion
Wakatakakage 若隆景	East Maegashira 12	2017-3	Arashio	December 6, 1994 (age 31)	(Japan) (Fukushima Prefecture) Fukushima	ten-time sekiwake with 2 makuuchi championships, younger brother of Wakamotoharu, sandanme tsukedashi
Yago 矢後	West Sandanme 22	2017-5	Oshiogawa	July 8, 1994 (age 32)	(Japan) (Hokkaido) Hokkaidō	best rank maegashira 10, one-time makushita and jonidan champion, makushita tsukedashi
Yoshiazuma 芳東	East Jonidan 81	1996-1	Tamanoi	May 26, 1977 (age 49)	(Japan) (Kumamoto Prefecture) Kumamoto	best rank maegashira 12, third-slowest rise ever to makuuchi
Yoshinofuji 義ノ富士	West Maegashira 2	2024-5	Isegahama	June 25, 2001 (age 25)	(Japan) (Kumamoto Prefecture) Kumamoto	one time komusubi, won two straight jūryō championships, makushita tsukedashi

== See also ==
- List of past sumo wrestlers
- List of non-Japanese sumo wrestlers
- List of sumo elders
- List of sumo stables
- List of sumo record holders
- List of sumo top division champions
- List of sumo top division runners-up
- List of sumo second division champions
- List of yokozuna
- List of ōzeki
- List of sekiwake
- List of komusubi
- List of years in sumo
- Glossary of sumo terms
