= Sumo (film) =

2025 Tamil film by SP Hosimin

- Theatrical release poster
- Directed by: S. P. Hosimin
- Screenplay by: Shiva
- Story by: S. P. Hosimin
- Produced by: Ishari K. Ganesh
- Starring: Shiva; Yoshinori Tashiro; Priya Anand
- Cinematography: Rajiv Menon
- Edited by: Praveen K. L.
- Music by: Nivas K. Prasanna
- Production company: Vels Film International
- Release date: 25 April 2025
- Running time: 115 minutes
- Country: India
- Language: Tamil

Sumo is a 2025 Indian Tamil-language sports comedy film directed by S. P. Hosimin, starring Shiva, Priya Anand and Yoshinori Tashiro with VTV Ganesh, Yogi Babu and Sathish in supporting roles. The film was produced by Ishari K. Ganesh under his Vels Film International banner with the technical team consisting of cinematographer Rajiv Menon, editor Praveen K. L. and composer Nivas K. Prasanna. Sumo was released in theatres on 25 April 2025 to mixed-to-negative reviews.

== Plot ==
The film starts with Jack, the owner of a surfing club with a lot of international guests, telling his backstory about a special container to the police. He also tells them about his friend surfer Shiva and his girlfriend Kani. He tells them about a sumo wrestler, who washed ashore near Chennai, who tightly clenches Shiva's pinky. Shiva gets a curtain stitched for the sumo wrestler as his clothes due to his size. Shiva tells the local police inspector about the sumo wrestler. After consulting a doctor, they discover that the sumo wrestler was mentally affected after landing ashore and acts like a child. Shiva suggests bringing the sumo wrestler to his and Jack's house to which Jack doesn't agree to.

Meanwhile, Kani is folding her clothes, her dupatta falls and lands on a local gangster Yogi Babu, which he mistakes for love. Yogi Babu tries to win over her father as well by drinking alcohol with him and indulges in antics such as making TikTok videos. Shiva and Jack take the sumo wrestler to local eating competitions to satisfy his insane hunger. Yogi Babu, who is jealous of Shiva, attacks the sumo wrestler with his henchman, but Shiva intervenes and saves him.

After he glares at a Japanese flag at a store, Shiva realises that the sumo wrestler has a special connection with Japan. Shiva, Kani and Jack name the sumo wrestler Ganesh after he acts as Ganesh during a festival. Shiva, Ganesh and Jack return to Japan via a travel agent in order for Ganesh to fight for his championship title, where he rediscover his past as a famous sumo wrestler named Tashiro. While they are in Japan, Yogi Babu takes advantage of the situation and falls for Kani. After going to Japan, Tashiro remembers his past where he trained under a famous master and how a famous don took advantage of him by making him act in advertisements and sending him to India. After much preparation, he wins the sumo championship even though the Japanese don killed his master. Shiva leaves with Kani to Australia and Jack is debt-ridden with his surfing club. A container containing a bunch of gold washes ashore while Jack is drinking alcohol during his sorrows and that Jack enjoys his newfound luxury after leaving some of the gold for the police.

== Cast ==
- Shiva as Shiva
- Yoshinori Tashiro as Tashiro (Ganesh)
- Priya Anand as Kani
- VTV Ganesh as Jack
- Yogi Babu as Yogi Babu
- Sathish as Inspector V. Anbu
- Nizhalgal Ravi as Kani's father
- Chetan as Pandian
- Srinath as Kasa Kasa Asahi Sake
- Aarthi Ganeshkar as herself
- Besant Ravi as Yogi Babu's right hand
- Mani as Mani
- Saapattu Raman as himself
- Suresh Chakravarthi as Suresh (uncredited)
- Ishari K. Ganesh as chief guest (in portrait)

== Production ==
In mid-June 2019, the production began for Shiva's next film helmed by S. P. Hosimin. The film reunites the lead actor with Priya Anand as the female lead after Vanakkam Chennai (2013), while Yoshinori Tashiro, a former Sumo wrestler plays an important role in the film. Eighteen other Sumo wrestlers also star in the film. Apart from acting, Shiva wrote the screenplay, handled the casting and scouted locations for the film.

Rajiv Menon, a cinematographer-cum-director, agreed to work on the film since Hosimin had previously worked under him as an assistant. Praveen K. L. handled the editing. The film has music composed by Nivas K. Prasanna and produced by Ishari K. Ganesh under his Vels Film International banner. The film also stars VTV Ganesh, Yogi Babu, Chetan, Besant Ravi, Srinath and others in supporting roles.

A major portion of the principal photography took place in Japan. The release of a trailer in April 2025 confirmed the inclusion of Sathish.

== Soundtrack ==
Sumo

Soundtrack album by Nivas K. Prasanna
- Genre: Feature film soundtrack
- Language: Tamil
- Producer: Nivas K. Prasanna

Nivas K. Prasanna chronology
Emakku Thozhil Romance (2024)	Sumo (2025)	Bun Butter Jam (2025)

The soundtrack is composed by Nivas K. Prasanna. The first single "Aazhiye" released on 21 April 2025.

No.	Title	Lyrics	Singer(s)	Length
1.	"Aazhiye"	Mohan Rajan, Deepti Reddy	Naresh Iyer, Hevin Booster, Nithyasree, Rose Veronica, Deepti Reddy	5:46
2.	"Kathiri Veyilil"	Mohan Rajan		4:31
3.	"Ganapathy"	Mohan Rajan	Nivas K. Prasanna	5:19
4.	"Kanavugal"	Mohan Rajan		4:18
Total length:				19:54

== Release ==
=== Theatrical ===
Sumo was released in theatres on 25 April 2025. The film was initially expected to release in theatres in 2021 but got delayed due to the COVID-19 pandemic and after much of a delay, in late-September 2024, it was announced that the film would release in October 2024, without mentioning a specific date, which did not pan out. In early April 2025, the final release date was announced.

=== Home media ===
Sumo began streaming on Sun NXT from 23 May 2025.

== Critical response ==
Abhinav Subramanian of The Times of India gave 2/5 stars and wrote "The comedy offers sporadic chuckles but doesn't consistently land with impact. The screenplay lacks a certain spark; events unfold, but often without exploring the culture clash or character depths beyond a surface level." Avinash Ramachandran of The Indian Express gave 2/5 stars and wrote "With the strength of the film seemingly lying in comedy, the detours into emotional zones, and some serious zones are distracting at best, and infuriating at their worst. It is almost like the makers can't decide what to do with the simple one-liner, and fill it up with embellishments that only disengage us."

Narayani M of Cinema Express gave 2/5 stars and wrote "The film's failure to resonate with audiences could be attributed to its datedness as Sumo was scheduled to be released almost five years ago. However, even as our tastes and sensibilities evolve over time, we still crave certain fundamental things like emotional connection and entertainment." Anusha Sundar of OTTPlay gave 1.5/5 stars and wrote "Sumo has been put together to be a sports comedy entertainer. Neither does it delve into the sports aspect, nor is able to make you laugh. If you don't count the body shaming jokes, the film more or less treats sumo only as an exhibit, expected to pique curiosity." News Today wrote, "If you're looking for an easy watch that brings together laughter and emotions, this one is worth your time. Let go of logic, and enjoy the ride with Shiva and his sumo friend".
