= Tamanoi stable =

Organization of sumo wrestlers

Coordinates: 35.7863°N 139.7790°E

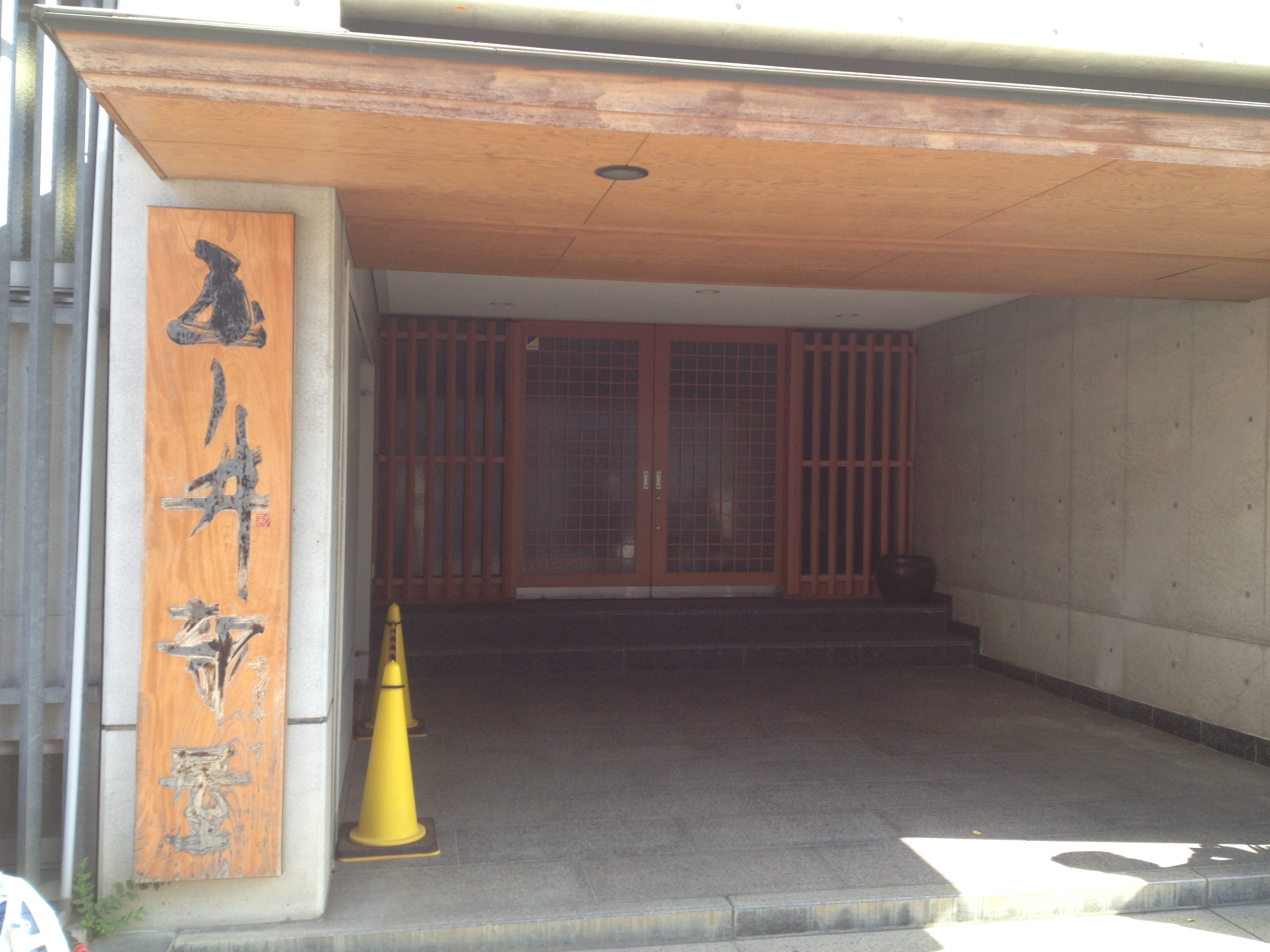

Tamanoi stable (玉ノ井部屋, Tamanoi-beya) is a stable of sumo wrestlers, part of the Dewanoumi ichimon or group of stables. It was set up in 1990 by former sekiwake Tochiazuma Tomoyori, who branched off from Kasugano stable. He coached his son, who also wrestled under the name Tochiazuma, to ōzeki rank. Tamanoi reached retirement age in September 2009, and was succeeded by his son.

As of May 2026, the stable has 24 active wrestlers.

The stable is based in Nishiarai in Tokyo's Adachi ward, and built new premises in 2004, 10 minutes from the old location. In December 2011 Tamanoi and wrestlers from the stable assisted the police by starting street crime prevention patrols in the local area in the run up to the New Year celebrations.

In September 2020 nineteen members of the stable tested positive for COVID-19, after a lower ranked wrestler became ill. Every wrestler at the stable was prevented from participating in the September tournament.

== Ring name conventions ==
Many wrestlers at this stable have taken ring names or shikona that include the character 東 (read: azuma or tō) meaning east, in deference to their coach and the stable's owner, the former Tochiazuma, as well as his father, the founder. It can also be used as a prefix, as in Azumaryū and Azumasato, as well as a suffix as in Yoshiazuma and Fujiazuma.

== Owners ==
- 2009–Present: 13th Tamanoi (iin, former ōzeki Tochiazuma II)
- 1990–2009: 12th Tamanoi (former sekiwake Tochiazuma I)

== Notable active wrestlers ==
- Fujiazuma (best rank maegashira)
- Tōhakuryū (best rank maegashira)
- Yoshiazuma (best rank maegashira)
- Hatsuyama (best rank maegashira)

== Notable former wrestlers ==
- Azumaryū (former maegashira)
- Ryūkō (former jūryō)
- Yoshinori (former makushita)

== Assistant ==
- Ōhidake (sewanin, former jūryō, real name Eiryū Idokawa)

== Referees ==
- Kimura Yukihiro (jūryō gyōji, real name Yukihiro Fukunaga)
- Kimura Hideaki (jūryō gyōji, real name Akira Moriyasu)

== Usher ==
- Shunsuke (makushita yobidashi, real name Satoru Watanabe)
- Hiroshi (sandanme yobidashi, real name Hiraoka Yoshitake)

== Hairdresser ==
- Tokotsuka (first class tokoyama)

== Location and access ==
Tokyo, Adachi ward, Nishiarai 4-1-1
10 minute walk from Nishiaraidaishi-nishi Station on the Nippori-Toneri Liner

== See also ==
- List of sumo stables
- List of active sumo wrestlers
- List of past sumo wrestlers
- Glossary of sumo terms
