= Yoshiazuma Hiroshi =

Japanese sumo wrestler

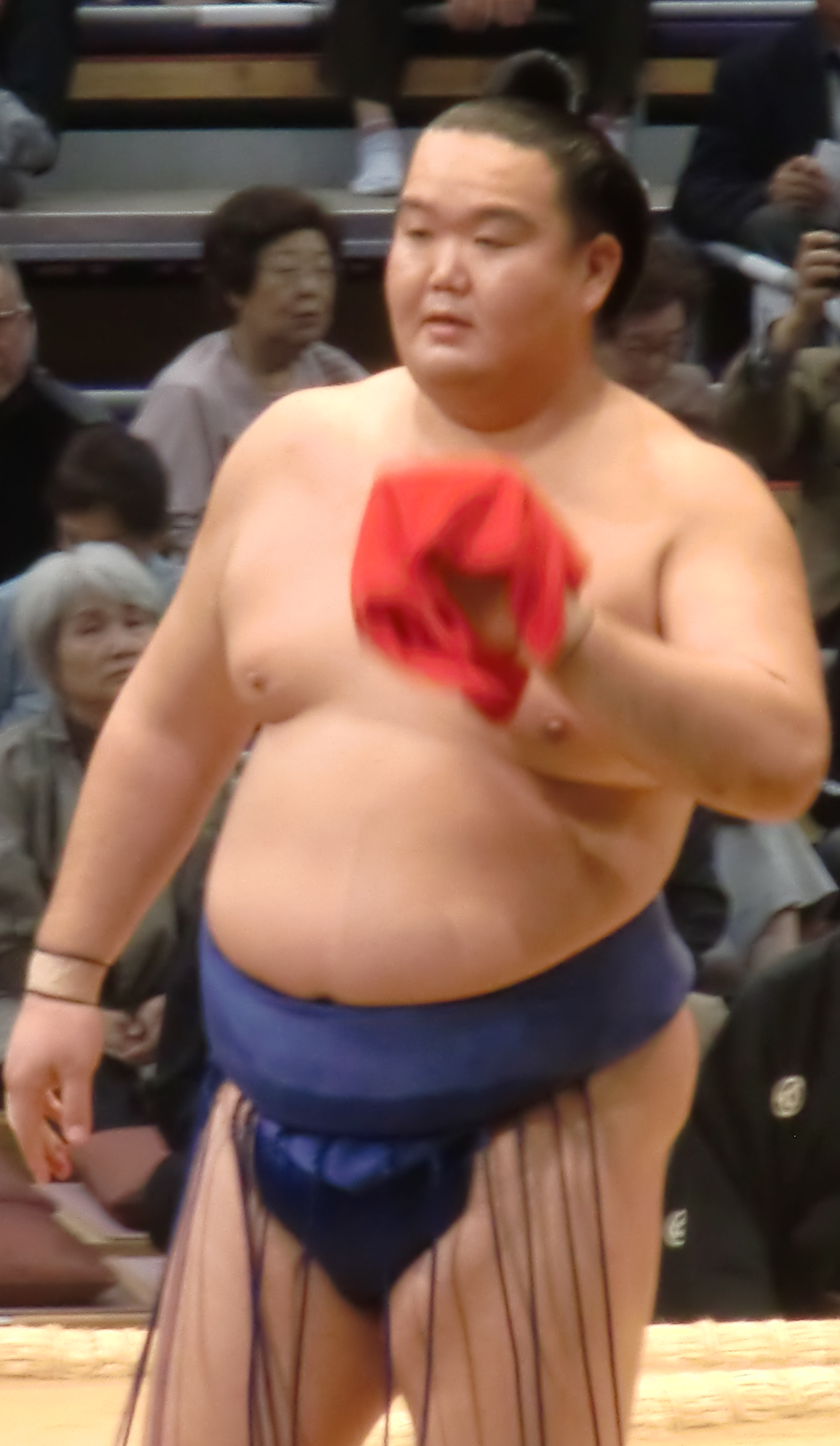
- Yoshiazuma in 2011

Personal information
- Native name: 芳東 洋
- Born: Hiroshi Ishihara; 26 May 1977 (age 49) Kashima, Kumamoto, Japan
- Height: 1.98 m (6 ft 6 in)
- Weight: 170 kg (370 lb)

Sport
- Sport: Sumo
- Rank: see below
- Heya: Tamanoi
- Record: 681-704-8
- Debut: January, 1996
- Highest rank: Maegashira 12 (January, 2012)
- Updated on 1 November 2023

Yoshiazuma Hiroshi (Japanese: 芳東 洋; born 26 May 1977 as Hiroshi Ishihara (石原 洋, Ishihara Hiroshi)) is a Japanese professional sumo wrestler from Kashima, Kumamoto. He made his professional debut in January 1996 and reached the top division in September 2011. His highest rank has been maegashira 12. The fifteen years it took him to reach the top division is the third-slowest progress ever, in the history of professional sumo wrestling. He has not missed a bout in his career to date, and in September 2023 moved into the top ten record holders for most consecutive bouts.

== Early life and sumo background ==
In his early years Ishihara was more interested in soccer, and was a member of the kendō team in middle school. He started sumo in high school, and in his third year contributed to his team taking the championship in a national tournament. He chose to join Tamanoi stable when he graduated high school.

== Career ==
Upon joining professional sumo in January 1996, he took the ring name of Yoshiazuma, taking the first character from a benefactor's name and the second character following the convention of taking the character of azuma from the current and previous stable owners, former Tochiazuma II, and Tochiazuma I. Yoshiazuma's career started out promisingly and in only his second tournament he almost took the jonidan division championship, losing twice to his rivals after an initial win in a three-man playoff. His career after this was lackluster however, and for the next fifteen years he would struggle in the unsalaried ranks, through a series of setbacks, ever so slowly working his way up through the ranks.

He finally achieved promotion to the salaried ranks of jūryō in January 2011. He scored only 6–9 in his jūryō debut, but after the cancellation of the March tournament he enjoyed a big promotion up the division from jūryō 13 to jūryō 2 despite only scoring a bare majority of 8–7 in the May 2011 "technical examination" tournament. He benefitted from a large number of retirements in the jūryō division following a match-fixing scandal, with the Sumo Association needing to over-promote to fill the gaps. However he took advantage of his good fortune by putting in a strong 9–6 score in July and was promoted to the top division for the September 2011 tournament. This feat took him fifteen years and 93 tournaments from his professional debut, the third slowest rise to the top division in the history of sumo. He was also the second oldest wrestler since World War II to earn promotion to makuuchi for the first time at 34 years, 3 months. However, he only lasted this one tournament, being relegated after a 5–10 record. His second tournament in makuuchi was also unsuccessful, a 3–12 in January 2012. After three winning records in the next four tournaments he earned promotion to makuuchi for a third time in November 2012, but was again demoted straightaway, after another 3–12 score. Yoshiazuma lost sekitori status altogether after the September 2014 tournament. He earned his 500th career win in the March 2016 tournament, and he has a career winning record of just under 50 percent, having fought 1008 matches up to that time. He was demoted to the sandanme division after this tournament, but was still active as of March 2022 at the age of 44, and he is the oldest active former sekitori.

He has not missed a bout through injury since his debut. July 2018 was his 135th career tournament with no absences over a period of 22 years, equal to Aobajo, although Yoshiazuma has fought around 500 bouts fewer than Aobajo's record of 1630 consecutive bouts, having spent only 21 of those tournaments in the sekitori ranks fighting a full 15 days. In September 2020 nineteen members of Tamanoi stable tested positive for COVID-19, after a lower ranked wrestler became ill. Every wrestler at the stable, including Yoshiazuma was prevented from participating in the September tournament. However, this was not considered an interruption to his streak of consecutive appearances, and in September 2023 he moved into the top ten all-time. He became the current oldest active rikishi in professional sumo after Satonofuji's retirement at the end of the May 2025 tournament.

== Fighting style ==
Yoshiazuma is a solidly yotsu-sumo wrestler who prefers grappling to pushing and thrusting techniques. His favoured grip on his opponent's mawashi or belt is migi-yotsu, a left hand outside, right hand inside position. He wins about half of his bouts with a straightforward yori-kiri, or force out. Another kimarite he regularly uses is hataki-komi, the slap down.

== Career record ==
Yoshiazuma Hiroshi
Year	January Hatsu basho, Tokyo	March Haru basho, Osaka	May Natsu basho, Tokyo	July Nagoya basho, Nagoya	September Aki basho, Tokyo	November Kyūshū basho, Fukuoka
1996	(Maezumō)	West Jonokuchi #48; 5–2	East Jonidan #155; 7–0–PPP	East Sandanme #97; 2–5	West Jonidan #23; 4–3	West Jonidan #4; 6–1
1997	East Sandanme #49; 3–4	West Sandanme #64; 2–5	East Sandanme #97; 4–3	West Sandanme #78; 4–3	East Sandanme #59; 4–3	West Sandanme #42; 5–2
1998	East Sandanme #14; 2–5	West Sandanme #39; 3–4	West Sandanme #55; 4–3	West Sandanme #39; 4–3	West Sandanme #24; 3–4	West Sandanme #36; 4–3
1999	West Sandanme #23; 4–3	East Sandanme #11; 4–3	East Makushita #60; 5–2	West Makushita #40; 4–3	East Makushita #30; 4–3	East Makushita #24; 1–6
2000	West Makushita #43; 5–2	West Makushita #26; 3–4	West Makushita #37; 4–3	East Makushita #29; 3–4	West Makushita #36; 4–3	East Makushita #27; 2–5
2001	East Makushita #42; 6–1	East Makushita #18; 4–3	East Makushita #15; 2–5	East Makushita #31; 5–2	East Makushita #18; 5–2	West Makushita #11; 2–5
2002	West Makushita #25; 4–3	West Makushita #21; 4–3	East Makushita #16; 5–2	East Makushita #9; 4–3	West Makushita #5; 3–4	East Makushita #11; 3–4
2003	West Makushita #14; 4–3	East Makushita #10; 3–4	West Makushita #15; 4–3	East Makushita #10; 3–4	East Makushita #16; 4–3	East Makushita #13; 3–4
2004	West Makushita #19; 5–2	West Makushita #9; 4–3	East Makushita #7; 4–3	East Makushita #1; 3–4	West Makushita #6; 3–4	East Makushita #10; 3–4
2005	West Makushita #15; 3–4	East Makushita #23; 4–3	West Makushita #18; 4–3	East Makushita #14; 3–4	East Makushita #19; 5–2	East Makushita #10; 4–3
2006	East Makushita #7; 3–4	West Makushita #13; 4–3	West Makushita #10; 2–5	East Makushita #23; 5–2	East Makushita #15; 3–4	West Makushita #21; 4–3
2007	East Makushita #17; 4–3	West Makushita #13; 5–2	West Makushita #5; 4–3	West Makushita #4; 4–3	West Makushita #3; 4–3	West Jūryō #14; 4–11
2008	East Makushita #5; 1–6	East Makushita #24; 6–1	East Makushita #9; 4–3	East Makushita #7; 3–4	East Makushita #13; 4–3	East Makushita #9; 4–3
2009	West Makushita #6; 4–3	East Makushita #4; 5–2	East Makushita #1; 3–4	East Makushita #6; 3–4	West Makushita #10; 3–4	West Makushita #14; 4–3
2010	East Makushita #13; 4–3	East Makushita #9; 5–2	West Makushita #4; 3–4	West Makushita #6; 4–3	East Makushita #1; 3–4	East Makushita #4; 5–2
2011	West Jūryō #11; 6–9	West Jūryō #13; Tournament Cancelled; Match fixing investigation 0–0–0	West Jūryō #13; 8–7	East Jūryō #2; 9–6	East Maegashira #13; 5–10	West Jūryō #1; 10–5
2012	East Maegashira #12; 3–12	East Jūryō #6; 8–7	West Jūryō #3; 6–9	East Jūryō #5; 8–7	West Jūryō #1; 9–6	East Maegashira #15; 3–12
2013	West Jūryō #7; 6–9	East Jūryō #10; 5–10	West Makushita #1; 4–3	East Jūryō #14; 9–6	West Jūryō #10; 8–7	West Jūryō #6; 5–10
2014	East Jūryō #10; 7–8	West Jūryō #10; 6–9	West Jūryō #13; 6–9	West Makushita #2; 5–2	West Jūryō #11; 4–11	East Makushita #2; 3–4
2015	West Makushita #4; 3–4	East Makushita #9; 1–6	East Makushita #35; 1–6	West Sandanme #2; 5–2	East Makushita #42; 5–2	West Makushita #23; 3–4
2016	West Makushita #31; 2–5	West Makushita #49; 2–5	East Sandanme #12; 2–5	West Sandanme #35; 5–2	West Sandanme #13; 3–4	West Sandanme #28; 6–1
2017	West Makushita #47; 2–5	East Sandanme #11; 3–4	West Sandanme #29; 4–3	East Sandanme #14; 3–4	East Sandanme #34; 2–5	East Sandanme #57; 3–4
2018	West Sandanme #72; 5–2	East Sandanme #41; 3–4	East Sandanme #55; 3–4	East Sandanme #72; 5–2	West Sandanme #42; 3–4	East Sandanme #51; 3–4
2019	East Sandanme #69; 5–2	West Sandanme #35; 3–4	East Sandanme #53; 4–3	East Sandanme #37; 4–3	West Sandanme #23; 2–5	West Sandanme #50; 2–5
2020	West Sandanme #77; 4–3	West Sandanme #57; 3–4	East Sandanme #76; Tournament Cancelled; State of Emergency; 0–0–0	East Sandanme #76; 1–6	East Jonidan #3; Sat out due to COVID rules 0–0–7	East Jonidan #3; 3–4
2021	East Jonidan #27; 6–1	East Sandanme #62; 4–3	West Sandanme #42; 3–4	East Sandanme #58; 5–2	West Sandanme #30; 3–4	West Sandanme #42; 2–5
2022	East Sandanme #67; 3–4	West Sandanme #78; 5–2	West Sandanme #45; 3–4	East Sandanme #56; 3–3–1	East Sandanme #56; 2–5	East Sandanme #89; 4–3
2023	East Sandanme #69; 2–5	East Jonidan #7; 4–3	East Sandanme #77; 2–5	West Jonidan #24; 4–3	West Jonidan #4; 4–3	East Sandanme #76; 3–4
2024	West Jonidan #7; 4–3	East Sandanme #78; 0–7	West Jonidan #39; 4–3	West Jonidan #16; 3–4	West Jonidan #38; 5–2	East Jonidan #4; 3–4
2025	West Jonidan #43; 3–4	West Jonidan #64; 4–3	West Jonidan #36; 3–4	West Jonidan #62; 3–4	East Jonidan #90; 5–2	East Jonidan #46; 3–4
2026	West Jonidan #69; 3–4	East Jonidan #86; 5–2	East Jonidan #42; 3–4	West Jonidan #61; 3–4	East Jonidan #81; 4–3	East Jonidan #51; 3–4
Record given as wins–losses–absences Top division champion Top division runner-up Retired Non-participation Jūryō Lower divisions Sanshō key: F=Fighting spirit; O=Outstanding performance; T=Technique Also shown: ★=Kinboshi; P=Playoff(s); Divisions: Makuuchi — Jūryō — Makushita — Sandanme — Jonidan — Jonokuchi Makuuchi ranks: Yokozuna — Ōzeki — Sekiwake — Komusubi — Maegashira

== See also ==
- List of sumo record holders
- Glossary of sumo terms
- List of active sumo wrestlers
