= Hatsuyama Shō =

Japanese sumo wrestler

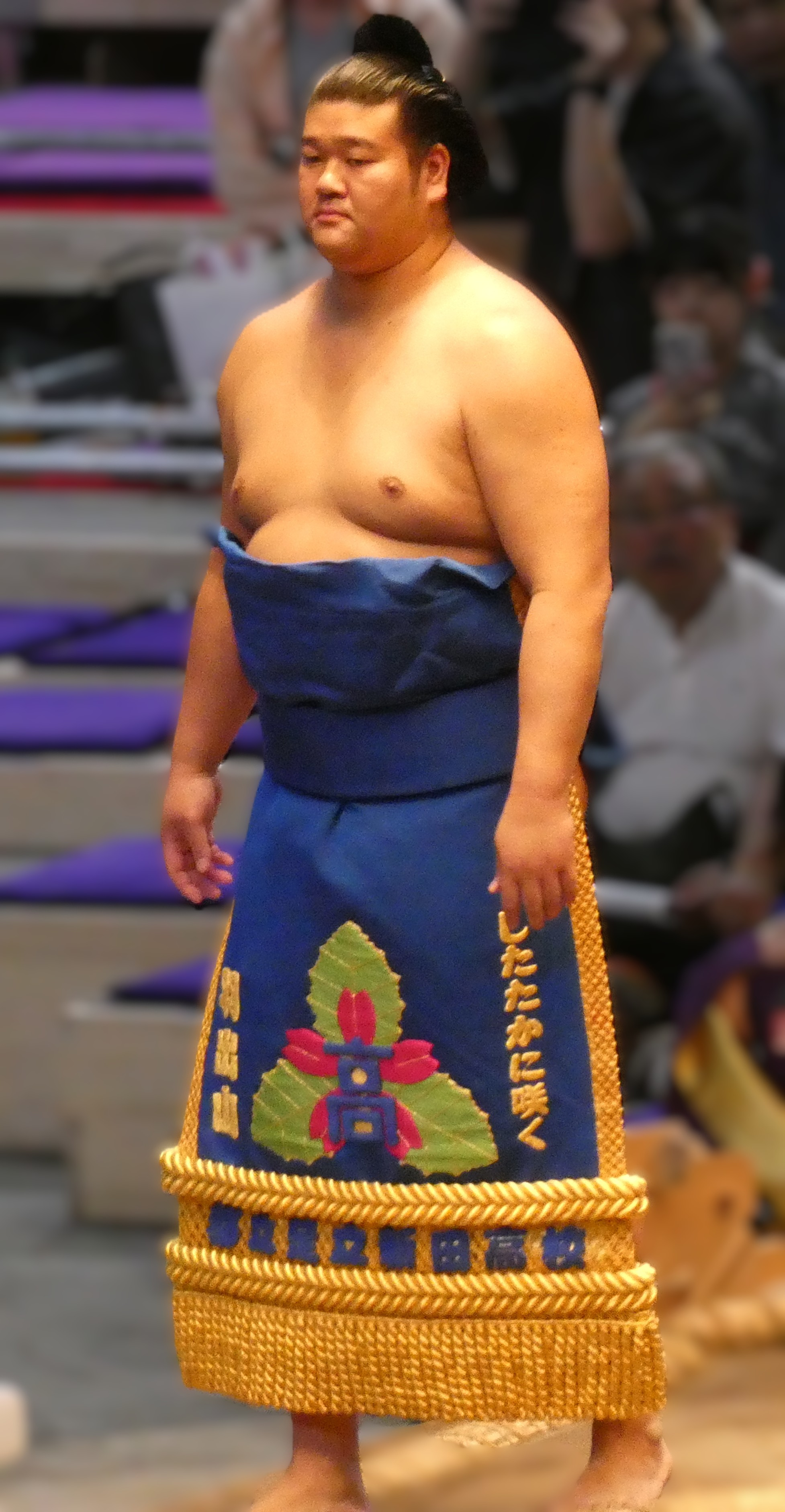
- Hatsuyama in July 2025

Personal information
- Native name: 羽出山 将
- Born: Shō Hatsuyama; November 5, 1999 (age 27) Higashimurayama, Tokyo, Japan
- Height: 1.94 m (6 ft 4 1/2 in)
- Weight: 141 kg (311 lb; 22.2 st)

Sport
- Sport: Sumo
- Rank: see below
- University team: Toyo University
- Heya: Tamanoi
- Debut: March 2022
- Highest rank: Maegashira 17 (January 2026)
- Championships: 1 (Makushita)
- Updated on January 16, 2026

Hatsuyama Shō (Japanese: 羽出山 将; born November 5, 1999) is a Japanese professional sumo wrestler from Higashimurayama, Tokyo. He wrestles for the Tamanoi stable and debuted in the March 2022 tournament.

== Early career ==
Hatsuyama first took up sumo in the sixth grade in his hometown in Tachikawa, Tokyo. He participated in the national tournament while attending Higashimurayama Daiyon Junior High School. In his third year at Adachi Shinden High School, he won the individual championship at the Kanazawa High School Sumo Tournament, and then went on to Toyo University. In his second year, he made it to the top eight in the All-Japan Championships and the All-Japan Student Championships. In his third year, he made it to the top eight in the All-Japan Championships, and made it to the top 16 in the All-Japan Student Championships in his fourth year.

== Career ==
After graduating from university, he was invited by Toyo University alumnus Tōhakuryū Masahito to join the Tamanoi stable. After reaching the top eight in the 2020 All Japan Championships, he made his debut in the sandanme division in 2022.

In the September 2024 tournament, he won the makushita division with a perfect record as the 16th ranked wrestler. In the following November tournament, he finished with a winning record of 5 wins and 2 losses as the top ranked wrestler in the makushita division, which meant that he could be promoted to sekitori if he had won more than he lost.

=== Jūryō promotion ===
At the ranking meeting after the November 2024 tournament, it was announced that he would be promoted to the jūryō division for the January tournament. He is the second sekitori to be promoted from Higashimurayama City after Kurosegawa Kuniyuki. He is also the second protégé of the 14th Tamanoi, former 2nd Tochinoshin, to be promoted to sekitori.

At the press conference announcing his promotion to the jūryō division, he mentioned his fellow countryman Ken Shimura as his idol, and expressed his desire to have Shimura's brother, who he has connections with, design a mawashi when he is promoted to the makuuchi division. He also stated that he wanted people to know his real name and how it was pronounced, so he intended to keep it. The surname "Hatsuyama" is said to be rare, with only around 20 people nationwide sharing the name.

He entered the November 2025 tournament at his highest rank of East Juryo 5, and on the eighth day of the tournament, he defeated Ryuden, a former san'yaku wrestler, in a makuuchi bout. He competed for the championship with new juryo wrestler Fujiryoga and former ozeki Asanoyama. Although he lost to Fujiryoga and missed out on the championship, he still had a good record of 11 wins and 4 losses.

=== Makuuchi promotion ===
After the November 2025 tournament, at the ranking meeting on December 22, it was announced that he would be promoted to the makuuchi division in the following January tournament. At the press conference, he commented, "The letters (on the ranking list) have become larger, so it's easier for many people to find me," and expressed his ambition, saying, "I want to be so successful that when people think of Higashimurayama, they think of my name and Ken Shimura's."

== Career record ==
Hatsuyama Shō
| Year | January Hatsu basho, Tokyo | March Haru basho, Osaka | May Natsu basho, Tokyo | July Nagoya basho, Nagoya | September Aki basho, Tokyo | November Kyūshū basho, Fukuoka |
|---|---|---|---|---|---|---|
| 2022 | x | Sandanme tsukedashi #100; 5–2 | West Sandanme #65; 6–1 | East Sandanme #10; 4–2–1 | East Makushita #60; 4–3 | West Makushita #51; 5–2 |
| 2023 | East Makushita #33; 6–1 | West Makushita #11; 2–5 | East Makushita #25; 4–3 | West Makushita #19; 5–2 | West Makushita #9; 3–4 | West Makushita #13; 5–2 |
| 2024 | West Makushita #4; 1–6 | West Makushita #25; 2–5 | East Makushita #38; 5–2 | East Makushita #22; 4–3 | East Makushita #16; 7–0; Champion | West Makushita #1; 5–2 |
| 2025 | East Jūryō #12; 6–9 | East Jūryō #13; 8–7 | West Jūryō #10; 6–9 | East Jūryō #13; 10–5 | East Jūryō #8; 9–6 | East Jūryō #5; 11–4 |
| 2026 | West Maegashira #17; 2–13 | West Jūryō #9; 9–6 | West Jūryō #3; 5–10 | West Jūryō #8; 7–8 | West Jūryō #8; 4–11 | East Jūryō #14; 4–11 |
Record given as wins–losses–absences Top division champion Top division runner-up Retired Non-participation Jūryō Lower divisions Sanshō key: F=Fighting spirit; O=Outstanding performance; T=Technique Also shown: ★=Kinboshi; P=Playoff(s); Divisions: Makuuchi — Jūryō — Makushita — Sandanme — Jonidan — Jonokuchi Makuuchi ranks: Yokozuna — Ōzeki — Sekiwake — Komusubi — Maegashira

== See also ==
- Glossary of sumo terms
- List of active sumo wrestlers
