= Ryūkō Gō =

Brazilian sumo wrestler

隆濤剛 Ryūkō Gō
Personal information
- Born: Luis Gō Ikemori; May 26, 1968 (age 58) São Paulo, Brazil
- Height: 184 cm (6 ft 1/2 in)
- Weight: 161 kg (355 lb; 25 st 5 lb)

Sport
- Sport: Sumo
- University team: Takushoku University
- Retired: January, 1999
- Heya: Tamanoi
- Record: 167-150-26
- Debut: May, 1992
- Highest rank: Jūryō 8 (March, 1995)

Ryūkō Gō (born 26 May 1968 as Luis Gō Ikemori) is a former sumo wrestler from São Paulo, Brazil.

== Career ==
As a youth, he did judo, turning to sumo at age 16. At age 18, he went to Japan and won an international tournament, and in 1990 competing for Takushoku University he became the first Brazilian to win the Japanese National Collegiate Sumo Championship. He turned professional in May 1992, joining the Tamanoi stable. He was the first foreign wrestler ever to be granted makushita tsukedashi status, meaning that because of his amateur sumo achievements he could start at the bottom of the third highest makushita division. He reached elite sekitori status in March 1994 when he was promoted to the jūryō division. Ryūkō was his final shikona or fighting name – he was also known as Ikemori and Ryūdō. His highest rank was Jūryō 8, achieved in March 1995. He had Japanese parentage and adopted Japanese citizenship on 22 April 1996 (the same day as Akebono). Having fallen down the banzuke rankings, he retired in January 1999. He has remained in Japan, working for a Tokyo business.

== Career record ==
Ryūkō Gō
Year	January Hatsu basho, Tokyo	March Haru basho, Osaka	May Natsu basho, Tokyo	July Nagoya basho, Nagoya	September Aki basho, Tokyo	November Kyūshū basho, Fukuoka
1992	x	x	Makushita tsukedashi #60; 5–2	West Makushita #38; 5–2	West Makushita #22; 3–4	West Makushita #29; 3–4
1993	West Makushita #38; 6–1	East Makushita #18; 4–3	West Makushita #13; 5–2	West Makushita #4; 3–4	West Makushita #8; 4–3	West Makushita #4; 5–2
1994	East Makushita #1; 4–3	West Jūryō #12; 6–9	East Makushita #2; 4–3	East Makushita #1; 4–3	West Jūryō #13; 5–10	West Makushita #4; 5–2
1995	West Jūryō #13; 10–5	West Jūryō #8; 6–9	West Jūryō #11; 8–7	West Jūryō #10; 8–7	East Jūryō #10; 1–2–12	West Makushita #8; Sat out due to injury 0–0–7
1996	West Makushita #8; 3–4	East Makushita #16; 2–5	West Makushita #34; 5–2	West Makushita #19; 3–4	West Makushita #28; 4–3	West Makushita #21; 4–3
1997	East Makushita #15; 6–1	West Makushita #5; 3–4	West Makushita #10; 2–5	West Makushita #27; 3–4	West Makushita #38; 4–3	West Makushita #29; 3–4
1998	East Makushita #39; 4–3	West Makushita #28; 3–4	West Makushita #39; 3–4	West Makushita #50; 3–4	West Sandanme #2; 3–4	West Sandanme #15; 5–2
1999	East Makushita #54; Retired; 0–0–7	x	x	x	x	x
Record given as wins–losses–absences Top division champion Top division runner-up Retired Lower divisions Non-participation Sanshō key: F=Fighting spirit; O=Outstanding performance; T=Technique Also shown: ★=Kinboshi; P=Playoff(s); Divisions: Makuuchi — Jūryō — Makushita — Sandanme — Jonidan — Jonokuchi Makuuchi ranks: Yokozuna — Ōzeki — Sekiwake — Komusubi — Maegashira

== See also ==
- List of non-Japanese sumo wrestlers
- List of past sumo wrestlers
