= Fujiazuma Kazuyoshi =

Japanese sumo wrestler

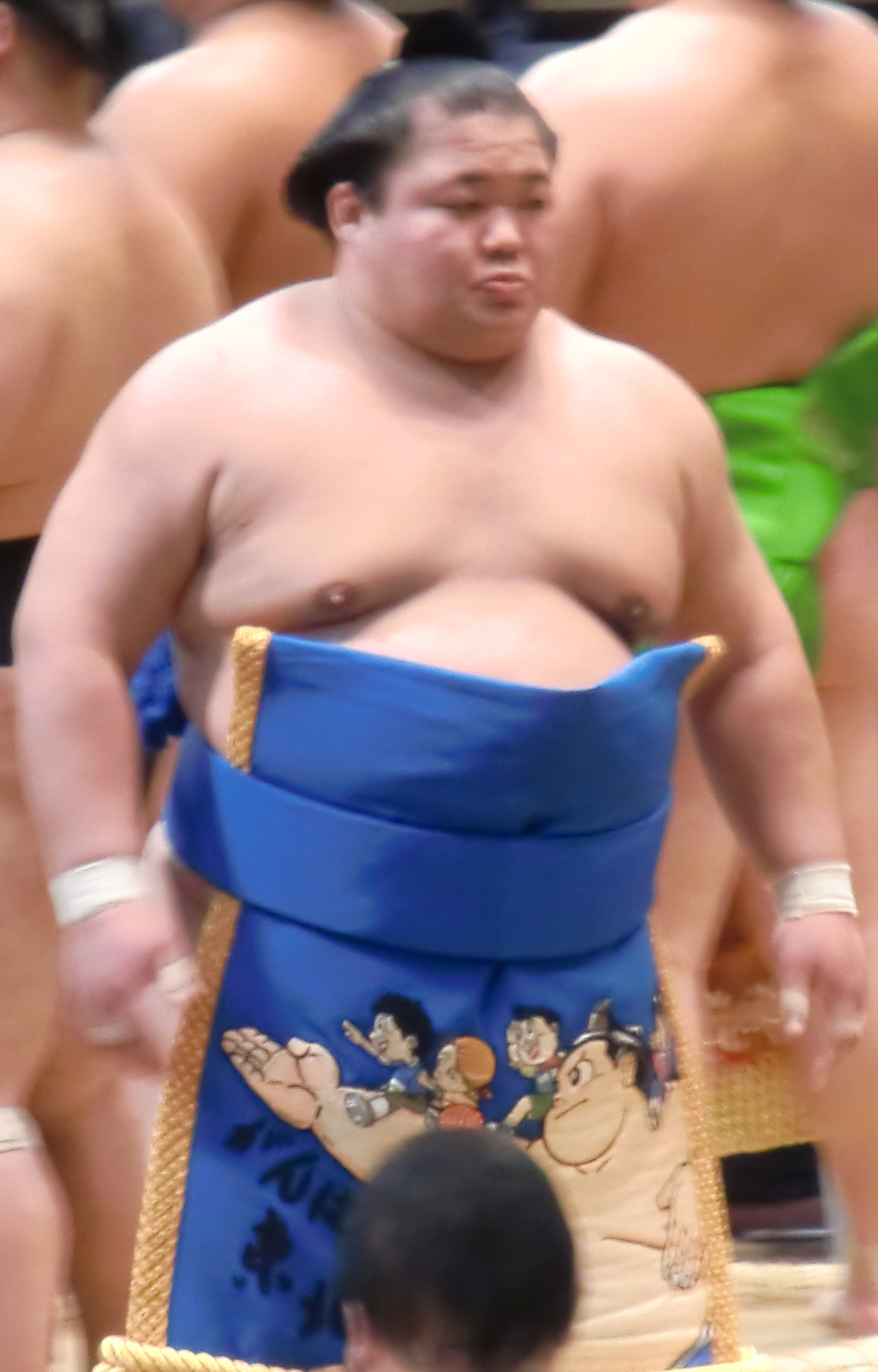
- Fujiazuma in 2011

Personal information
- Native name: 富士東 和佳
- Born: Kazuyoshi Shibuya; April 19, 1987 (age 39) Adachi-ku, Tokyo, Japan
- Height: 1.81 m (5 ft 11 1/2 in)
- Weight: 165 kg (364 lb)

Sport
- Sport: Sumo
- Rank: See below
- Heya: Tamanoi
- Debut: March, 2003
- Highest rank: Maegashira 4 (July, 2013)
- Championships: 1 (Jūryō)
- Updated on 1 November 2023

Fujiazuma Kazuyoshi (Japanese: 富士東 和佳; born April 19, 1987 as Kazuyoshi Shibuya (渋谷 和由)) is a Japanese professional sumo wrestler from Adachi, Tokyo, Japan. He entered sumo in March 2003, reaching the top makuuchi division in July 2011. His highest rank to date has been maegashira 4, which he achieved in July 2013 after he put together five straight kachi-koshi or winning records in the top division. He was last ranked in makuuchi in 2015 and since then has been in the jūryō and makushita divisions. He wrestles for Tamanoi stable.

== Early life and sumo background ==
Kazuyoshi Shibuya went to primary school and junior high school in the Adachi, Tokyo. He began practicing sumo in his fifth year of primary school and in his sixth year came in second in a national primary school sumo tournament. He had been going to Tamanoi stable regularly for practice since primary school as his sumo club had an ongoing relationship with the stable, and this was the stable he ultimately chose to join after junior high school.

== Career ==
He made his debut in March 2003, the same tournament as later jūryō contemporary Sadanoumi. He rose gradually to the ranks of makushita and was working his way up, but would start to suffer from pain due to a neck injury and would eventually drop back down to the fourth tier sandanme division. After two tournaments here he would slowly work his way through makushita again. He reached the elite sekitori ranks in January 2011, a little over seven years after his professional debut.

His rise through jūryō and onto the top-tier makuuchi division was surprisingly smooth compared to his struggles in lower divisions, undoubtedly helped by the forced retiring of several jūryō and lower makuuchi wrestlers due to an unprecedented match-fixing scandal. In these circumstances, a relatively average record of 9–6 at jūryō #8 would allow him promotion to the makuuchi division in July of that year.

A member of Tamanoi stable, he is the first top division wrestler produced by Tamanoi's head coach, the former ozeki Tochiazuma Daisuke. This first makuuchi tournament would be a very successful 10–5 record which would allow him to rise higher through the ranks, but his following four efforts were all losing tournaments which saw him slide back to maegashira 15. A very disappointing 3–12 score in the May 2012 tournament saw him demoted back to the jūryō division, but upon his return to the top division he put together a string of five consecutive 8–7 records which eventually saw him promoted to his highest rank to date of maegashira 4.

He sat out the March 2014 tournament, recuperating after a detached retina operation. This led to his demotion back to jūryō for the following May 2014 tournament where he only managed a 7–8 record. He won the jūryō division championship in March 2015 and was promoted back to makuuchi, but his return to the top division lasted only one tournament as he could only score 3–12. This has been his last makuuchi appearance to date. He was demoted to the makushita division after the September 2016 tournament, but promoted back to jūryō for March 2017 after a 5–2 score at makushita 3 in January. His stay in jūryō lasted only one tournament and he was back in the makushita division in May 2017. He reached the top rank of the makushita division, #1 East, in May 2019 but just failed to get the majority of wins that would have returned him to jūryō, scoring 3–4. However, he remained near the top of the makushita division and he returned to jūryō after 18 tournaments away for the July 2020 tournament (originally scheduled for May). He maintained his position in jūryō for the September 2020 tournament, but was prevented from entering it due to a COVID-19 outbreak at his stable. Fujiazuma was one of the 19 wrestlers who tested positive. He and the other members of the stable were allowed to keep their ranks for the following tournament in November. In this tournament Fujiazuma lost every one of his fifteen matches, the second straight jūryō wrestler to suffer this fate after Oki in the previous tournament.

== Fighting style ==
Fujiazuma wins most of his bouts by pushing and thrusting; his most common winning kimarite or technique is oshi dashi (push out).

== Career record ==
Fujiazuma Kazuyoshi
Year	January Hatsu basho, Tokyo	March Haru basho, Osaka	May Natsu basho, Tokyo	July Nagoya basho, Nagoya	September Aki basho, Tokyo	November Kyūshū basho, Fukuoka
2003	x	(Maezumō)	East Jonokuchi #13; 5–2	West Jonidan #78; 5–2	East Jonidan #34; 4–3	West Jonidan #12; 4–3
2004	East Sandanme #92; 5–2	East Sandanme #58; 5–2	West Sandanme #28; 4–3	East Sandanme #13; 4–3	West Sandanme #2; 3–4	East Sandanme #15; 3–4
2005	East Sandanme #30; 4–3	East Sandanme #20; 4–3	West Sandanme #7; 4–3	West Makushita #57; 4–3	West Makushita #47; 5–2	West Makushita #31; 5–2
2006	West Makushita #17; 4–3	East Makushita #14; 2–5	West Makushita #30; 2–5	West Makushita #47; 5–2	East Makushita #32; 6–1	East Makushita #11; 3–4
2007	East Makushita #18; 2–5	East Makushita #37; 4–3	West Makushita #31; 3–4	West Makushita #38; 4–3	East Makushita #31; 1–6	East Sandanme #3; 3–4
2008	West Sandanme #12; 5–2	East Makushita #53; 4–3	East Makushita #44; 5–2	West Makushita #29; 4–3	West Makushita #24; 6–1	West Makushita #8; 2–5
2009	East Makushita #24; 4–3	East Makushita #18; 5–2	East Makushita #10; 4–3	West Makushita #8; 3–4	East Makushita #15; 3–4	East Makushita #20; 5–2
2010	West Makushita #15; 4–3	East Makushita #11; 3–4	West Makushita #16; 5–2	West Makushita #7; 4–3	West Makushita #2; 3–4	West Makushita #5; 5–2
2011	West Jūryō #13; 8–7	West Jūryō #8; Tournament Cancelled; Match fixing investigation 0–0–0	West Jūryō #8; 9–6	East Maegashira #15; 10–5	East Maegashira #7; 6–9	West Maegashira #10; 7–8
2012	East Maegashira #11; 7–8	West Maegashira #12; 5–10	East Maegashira #15; 3–12	West Jūryō #5; 10–5	East Maegashira #15; 8–7	East Maegashira #13; 8–7
2013	West Maegashira #11; 8–7	East Maegashira #9; 8–7	East Maegashira #7; 8–7	West Maegashira #4; 5–10	East Maegashira #8; 6–9	West Maegashira #12; 8–7
2014	West Maegashira #9; 5–10	East Maegashira #15; Sat out due to injury 0–0–15	East Jūryō #8; 7–8	West Jūryō #9; 8–7	West Jūryō #6; 7–8	East Jūryō #7; 7–8
2015	East Jūryō #8; 9–6	East Jūryō #3; 12–3; Champion	East Maegashira #13; 3–12	East Jūryō #5; 10–5	East Jūryō #1; 6–9	West Jūryō #4; 9–6
2016	West Jūryō #1; 6–9	East Jūryō #3; 5–10	East Jūryō #7; 7–8	East Jūryō #8; 4–11	East Jūryō #14; 5–10	East Makushita #4; 4–3
2017	East Makushita #3; 5–2	West Jūryō #14; 6–9	East Makushita #2; 2–5	East Makushita #12; 4–3	East Makushita #10; 2–5	East Makushita #20; 3–4
2018	West Makushita #26; 4–3	East Makushita #23; 6–1	West Makushita #8; 1–6	East Makushita #31; 5–2	West Makushita #19; 3–4	West Makushita #28; 6–1
2019	East Makushita #10; 6–1	East Makushita #2; 4–3	East Makushita #1; 3–4	East Makushita #5; 2–5	East Makushita #12; 3–4	West Makushita #17; 5–2
2020	West Makushita #7; 4–3	West Makushita #3; 5–2	East Jūryō #11; Tournament Cancelled; State of Emergency; 0–0–0	East Jūryō #11; 6–9	East Jūryō #14; Sat out due to COVID rules 0–0–15	East Jūryō #14; 0–15
2021	East Makushita #13; 1–6	East Makushita #34; 4–3	East Makushita #24; 3–4	East Makushita #32; 3–4	East Makushita #40; 4–3	East Makushita #29; 4–3
2022	West Makushita #23; 3–4	West Makushita #30; 3–4	East Makushita #36; 3–4	East Makushita #47; 2–4–1	East Makushita #47; 3–4	East Sandanme #2; 5–2
2023	East Makushita #40; 4–3	East Makushita #31; 3–4	West Makushita #40; 1–6	West Sandanme #4; 2–5	East Sandanme #29; 4–3	West Sandanme #15; 3–4
2024	East Sandanme #30; 3–4	West Sandanme #41; 4–3	West Sandanme #27; 4–3	West Sandanme #14; 5–2	East Makushita #50; 3–4	West Makushita #60; 5–2
2025	West Makushita #36; 3–4	East Makushita #46; 2–4–1	East Sandanme #10; 1–3–3	West Sandanme #46; 5–2	East Sandanme #21; 2–5	West Sandanme #43; 5–2
2026	West Sandanme #20; 4–3	West Sandanme #8; 4–3	East Makushita #59; 3–4	West Sandanme #9; 2–5	East Sandanme #31; 2–5	East Sandanme #62; 6–1
Record given as wins–losses–absences Top division champion Top division runner-up Retired Non-participation Jūryō Lower divisions Sanshō key: F=Fighting spirit; O=Outstanding performance; T=Technique Also shown: ★=Kinboshi; P=Playoff(s); Divisions: Makuuchi — Jūryō — Makushita — Sandanme — Jonidan — Jonokuchi Makuuchi ranks: Yokozuna — Ōzeki — Sekiwake — Komusubi — Maegashira

== See also ==
- Glossary of sumo terms
- List of active sumo wrestlers
- List of sumo second division champions
