= Kyushu Institute of Information Sciences =

Coordinates: 33°31′28.3″N 130°32′25.5″E

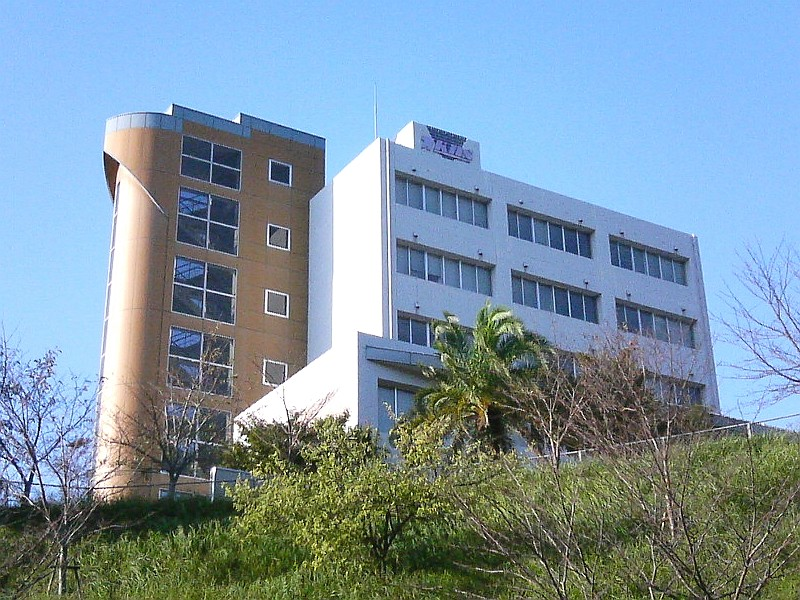
Dazaifu campus of Kyushu Institute of Information Sciences

Kyushu Institute of Information Sciences (九州情報大学, Kyūshū jōhō daigaku) is a private university in Dazaifu, Fukuoka, Japan, established in 1998.
