= Azumaryū Tsuyoshi =

Mongolian sumo wrestler

Azumaryū Tsuyoshi 東龍 強
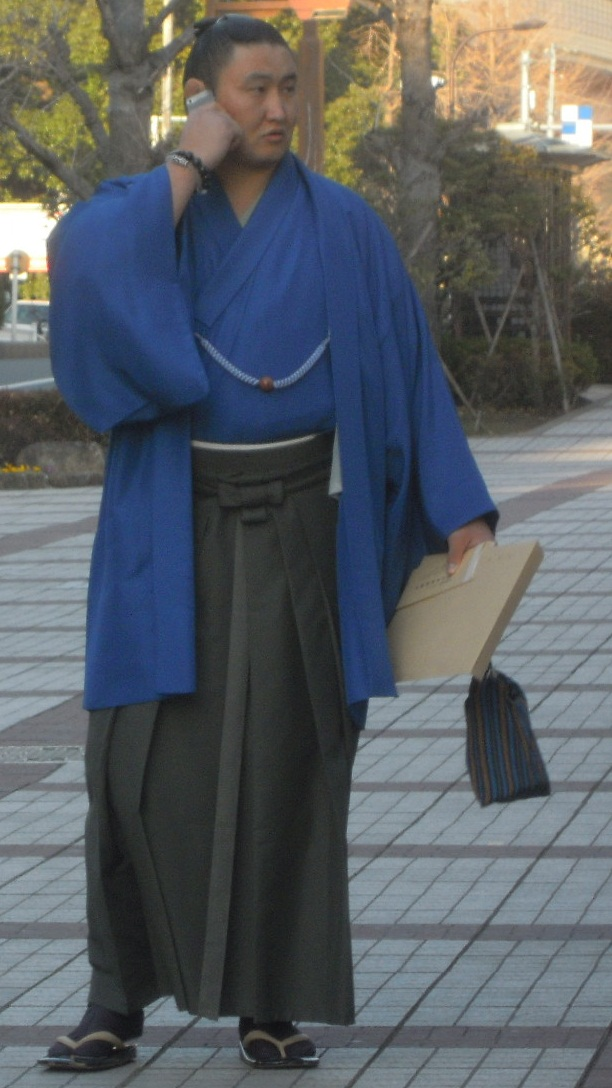
- Azumaryū in 2012

Personal information
- Born: Sanduijav Todbileg; May 12, 1987 (age 39) Govi-Altai Province, Mongolia
- Height: 1.92 m (6 ft 3 1/2 in)
- Weight: 155 kg (342 lb; 24.4 st)

Sport
- Sport: Sumo
- University team: Kyushu Institute of Information Sciences
- Retired: 25 December 2023
- Heya: Tamanoi
- Record: 528-522-47
- Debut: January 2009
- Highest rank: Maegashira 11 (March 2023)
- Championships: 1 (Jūryō)
- Updated on 25 December 2023

Azumaryū Tsuyoshi (Japanese: 東龍 強; born 12 May 1987 as Sanduijav Todbileg (Mongolian: Сандуйжавын Тодбилэг)) is a former Mongolian professional sumo wrestler from Govi-Altai Province. His highest rank has been maegashira 11. After an amateur sumo career at the Kyushu Institute of Information Sciences, he turned professional in November 2008, reaching sekitori status in January 2013 upon promotion to the jūryō division. He was ranked in the top makuuchi division on nine occasions without earning a winning record before finally achieving it on his tenth attempt in January 2023. He was demoted to the makushita division in 2015, but won promotion back to jūryō in November 2015 and the top division in September 2019. He has one jūryō division championship. He wrestled for Tamanoi stable.

== Career ==
Azumaryū came to Japan at the age of 15, and attended Meitoku Gijuku High School, known for its strong sumo club. He joined the Kyushu Institute of Information Sciences but left in his third year when an opening became available at Tamanoi stable after the retirement of the Brazilian Takaazuma (sumo rules restrict foreigners to one per stable). The Japan Sumo Association had recently had issues with foreign wrestlers such as Hakurozan and Rohō who had been dismissed from sumo after a cannabis scandal but Azumaryū's six years in Japan convinced the stable that he had the necessary experience of Japanese culture to be a success. Although he was accepted by the stable in November 2008, he was not able to make his debut on the dohyō until the following tournament in January 2009, because of Sumo Association rules requiring foreigners to have satisfied all their visa requirements and attend sumo education classes.

Azumaryū moved through the lower divisions quickly, but found the makushita division more difficult. Finally in November 2012 a 6–1 record at the top of makushita saw him promoted to the jūryō division. He said upon his promotion that he hoped to emulate his hero Kaiō. In just his second tournament in the division he lost a play-off for the yūshō or championship to fellow Mongolian Kyokushūhō after both finished with 12–3 records, and this performance earned him promotion to the top makuuchi division for the first time. A 6–9 record saw him demoted straight back to jūryō, but he returned to the top division after a 10–5 record in January 2014 at jūryō 3. In his second makuuchi tournament in March 2014 he was ranked at maegashira 14 and stood at five wins and four losses after nine days, but finished with another 6–9 record. The retirement of Kotoōshū after that tournament opened up an extra slot in makuuchi, but Sadanoumi, with 8–7 at jūryō 4, was given the extra rank of maegashira 17 over Azumaryū who again was demoted. He won promotion back to makuuchi for the July 2014 tournament, but injured his knee on the 14th day and had to withdraw, losing his scheduled 15th day bout by default. This was the first bout he had missed in his career. His 7–8 record was enough to keep him in makuuchi but his injury kept him out of the following tournament in September 2014, resulting in a fall to jūryō. Although he returned in November 2014 two more losing records saw him demoted to the unsalaried makushita division for the March 2015 tournament.

In September 2015 he took part in an eight-way play-off for the makushita championship, and although he was defeated by Chiyoshōma in the semi-final stage his 6–1 record was good enough for a return to jūryō. He has remained a sekitori since then, and although he was consistent enough to avoid demotion he did not win promotion back to the top division until 2019, when a majority of wins at jūryō 1 saw him return to makuuchi after 30 tournaments away. This is the second longest gap between top division appearances after Satoyama's 37 tournaments. He managed only a 6–9 record in his makuuchi return and was demoted back to jūryō, but an 11–4 record from the top rank of Jūryō 1 East ensured his immediate return to the top division. He also won the jūryō division championship after a four-way playoff with Ikioi, Kaisei and Kiribayama, his first yūshō in any division.

Azumaryū remained in the top division for two tournaments, but was back in jūryō for the third tournament of 2020, held in July. He missed the September tournament because of an outbreak of COVID-19 at his stable, but along with all his stablemates did not suffer any drop in rank as a result. After spending the whole of 2021 in jūryō, he won promotion back to makuuchi following a 10-5 record at jūryō 2 in the March 2022 tournament. He had to withdraw from Day 11 of the July 2022 tournament after another COVID outbreak at Tamanoi stable. He returned to the top division for the November 2022 tournament at maegashira 14, and secured his first top division kachi-koshi in January 2023. In the following tournament in March he lost 11 of his 15 matches and was subsequently demoted back to jūryō. He injured his left knee in his opening bout of the November 2023 tournament against Hakuyōzan, forcing his withdrawal from competition.

Soon after the release of the banzuke on 25 December 2023 Azumaryū, having been demoted out of sekitori status, retired from professional sumo.

== Fighting style ==
Azumaryū preferred a migi yotsu (left hand outside, right hand inside) grip on his opponent's mawashi. His favourite kimarite or techniques were yori-kiri (force out) and uwatenage (overarm throw).

== Personal life ==
Azumaryū has been married to a Mongolian woman one year his senior since 2011, when their marriage was registered in Ulaanbaatar. They have two daughters and one son. A formal wedding ceremony was held in Tokyo on 19 February 2023, one month after Azumaryū secured his first winning record in the top division.

== Career record ==
Azumaryū Tsuyoshi
Year	January Hatsu basho, Tokyo	March Haru basho, Osaka	May Natsu basho, Tokyo	July Nagoya basho, Nagoya	September Aki basho, Tokyo	November Kyūshū basho, Fukuoka
2009	(Maezumo)	East Jonokuchi #23; 5–2	East Jonidan #90; 6–1	West Jonidan #13; 5–2	East Sandanme #81; 7–0	East Makushita #52; 4–3
2010	East Makushita #45; 5–2	East Makushita #33; 3–4	East Makushita #39; 5–2	East Makushita #26; 4–3	East Makushita #18; 3–4	West Makushita #23; 4–3
2011	East Makushita #20; 1–6	West Makushita #44; Tournament Cancelled; Match fixing investigation 0–0–0	West Makushita #44; 5–2	East Makushita #18; 5–2	West Makushita #5; 2–5	East Makushita #12; 4–3
2012	West Makushita #9; 4–3	East Makushita #5; 3–4	West Makushita #10; 5–2	West Makushita #6; 4–3	East Makushita #5; 4–3	West Makushita #1; 6–1
2013	East Jūryō #10; 8–7	East Jūryō #8; 12–3–P	East Maegashira #16; 6–9	East Jūryō #3; 7–8	West Jūryō #4; 8–7	West Jūryō #2; 7–8
2014	West Jūryō #3; 10–5	East Maegashira #14; 6–9	East Jūryō #1; 10–5	West Maegashira #14; 7–8	West Maegashira #14; Sat out due to injury 0–0–15	East Jūryō #10; 6–9
2015	East Jūryō #12; 6–9	East Makushita #1; 2–5	West Makushita #12; 5–2	West Makushita #5; 4–3	East Makushita #2; 6–1–PP	West Jūryō #9; 6–9
2016	West Jūryō #11; 9–6	West Jūryō #7; 7–8	East Jūryō #8; 10–5	West Jūryō #1; 7–8	East Jūryō #3; 6–9	West Jūryō #6; 8–7
2017	West Jūryō #4; 5–10	West Jūryō #9; 9–6	West Jūryō #5; 8–7	East Jūryō #3; 8–7	West Jūryō #2; 6–9	West Jūryō #4; 8–7
2018	East Jūryō #2; 7–8	West Jūryō #3; 6–9	East Jūryō #6; 7–8	West Jūryō #7; 5–10	East Jūryō #13; 9–6	East Jūryō #10; 9–6
2019	East Jūryō #7; 7–8	East Jūryō #7; 8–7	West Jūryō #4; 8–7	West Jūryō #1; 8–7	West Maegashira #15; 6–9	East Jūryō #1; 11–4–PP; Champion
2020	East Maegashira #15; 7–8	East Maegashira #16; 5–10	East Jūryō #3; Tournament Cancelled; State of Emergency; 0–0–0	East Jūryō #3; 5–10	West Jūryō #7; Sat out due to COVID rules 0–0–15	West Jūryō #7; 8–7
2021	East Jūryō #6; 7–8	West Jūryō #7; 9–6	West Jūryō #3; 5–10	West Jūryō #7; 7–8	East Jūryō #8; 5–10	West Jūryō #10; 9–6
2022	West Jūryō #5; 9–6	East Jūryō #2; 10–5	East Maegashira #15; 5–10	East Jūryō #2; 4–7–4	West Jūryō #2; 9–6	West Maegashira #14; 7–8
2023	West Maegashira #14; 9–6	East Maegashira #11; 4–11	East Jūryō #2; 2–13	West Jūryō #6; 7–8	West Jūryō #6; 3–12	West Jūryō #14; 0–2–13
2024	East Makushita #13; Retired –	x	x	x	x	x
Record given as wins–losses–absences Top division champion Top division runner-up Retired Lower divisions Non-participation Sanshō key: F=Fighting spirit; O=Outstanding performance; T=Technique Also shown: ★=Kinboshi; P=Playoff(s); Divisions: Makuuchi — Jūryō — Makushita — Sandanme — Jonidan — Jonokuchi Makuuchi ranks: Yokozuna — Ōzeki — Sekiwake — Komusubi — Maegashira

== See also ==
- Glossary of sumo terms
- List of past sumo wrestlers
- List of Mongolian sumo wrestlers
- List of non-Japanese sumo wrestlers
- List of sumo second division champions
