= Tochiazuma Daisuke =

Japanese sumo wrestler (born 1976)

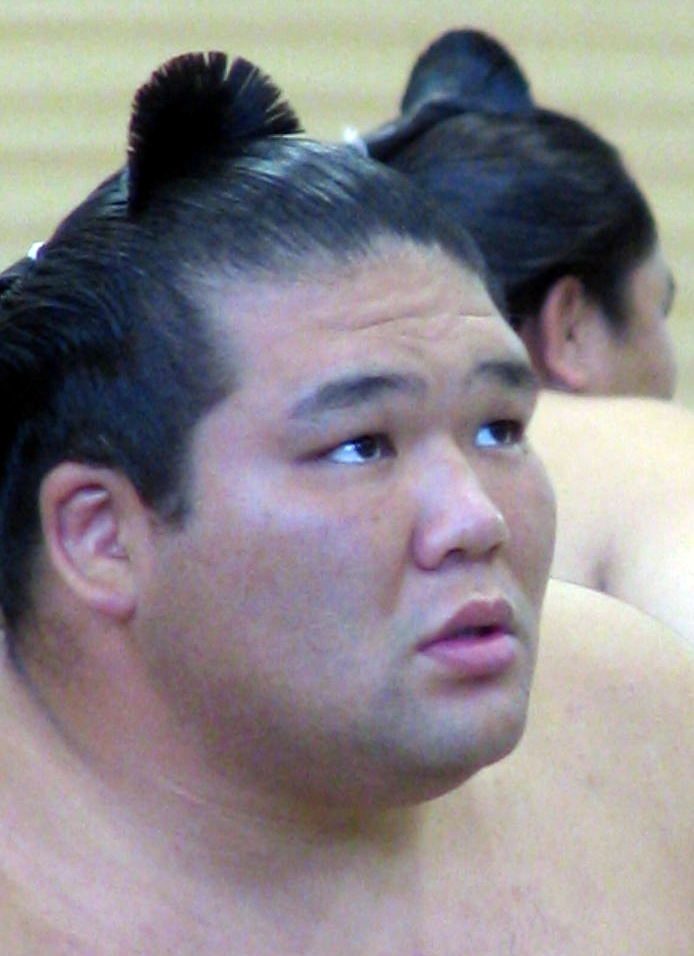

Personal information
- Native name: 栃東 大裕
- Born: Daisuke Shiga; November 9, 1976 (age 49) Tokyo, Japan
- Height: 1.80 m (5 ft 11 in)
- Weight: 155 kg (342 lb; 24.4 st)
- Website: http://www.tochiazuma.jp/

Sport
- Sport: Sumo
- Retired: May 2007
- Heya: Tamanoi
- Record: 560-317-169
- Debut: November 1994
- Highest rank: Ōzeki (January 2002)
- Elder name: Tamanoi
- Championships: 3 (Makuuchi); 1 (Jūryō); 1 (Makushita); 1 (Sandanme); 1 (Jonidan); 1 (Jonokuchi)
- Special Prizes: Outstanding Performance (3); Fighting Spirit (2); Technique (7)
- Gold Stars: 4 Takanohana II (2); Musashimaru; Akebono
- Updated on May 2007

Tochiazuma Daisuke (born November 9, 1976, as Daisuke Shiga in Tokyo, Japan) is a retired sumo wrestler. He began his professional career in 1994, reaching the top division just two years later after winning a tournament championship in each of the lower divisions. After winning twelve special prizes and four gold stars, he reached his highest rank of ōzeki in 2002 and won three top division tournament championships before retiring because of health reasons in 2007 at the age of 30. In 2009 he became the head coach of Tamanoi stable.

== Early career ==
Born in Adachi, Tochiazuma is the youngest son of former sekiwake and January 1972 tournament winner Tochiazuma Tomoyori, who was the first bearer of the Tochiazuma shikona (fighting name). After his career, Daisuke's father became an elder in the Japan Sumo Association with the name Tamanoi Tomoyori and began his own sumo stable, of which his son was a member.

The younger Tochiazuma entered professional sumo in November 1994, using his birth name as a shikona. He had a remarkably rapid rise, winning his first 26 matches (equalling Itai's record) and reaching the jūryō division in May 1996, only nine tournaments after his debut. At that point he adopted his father's old shikona. He broke into the top makuuchi division at the end of that year and won the Fighting Spirit prize in his first tournament. In July 1997, Tochiazuma was promoted to the prestigious san'yaku ranks and was a sekiwake for much of the time during the following years, although he bounced back and forth a few times due to injuries. He earned 12 sanshō prizes, including seven for Technique.

== Ōzeki ==
After three double figure scores and two consecutive runner-up performances Tochiazuma was promoted to ōzeki for the first time in November 2001, and instantly won the January 2002 tournament – exactly 30 years after his father's own championship. He was the first ōzeki since Kiyokuni in 1969 to win the championship on his ōzeki debut. He also became the first wrestler since Haguroyama in 1941 to win the tournament championship in all six professional sumo divisions. Tochiazuma's other top division championship victories occurred in November 2003 and January 2006. However, he never won two consecutive tournaments, nor could he achieve an "equivalent performance" over three tournaments, which is needed for promotion to the top yokozuna rank. His January 2006 success brought Asashōryū's record run of seven consecutive tournament victories to an end, but Tochiazuma could manage only third place in the following tournament. It also proved to be the last top division championship won by a Japanese born wrestler for ten years.

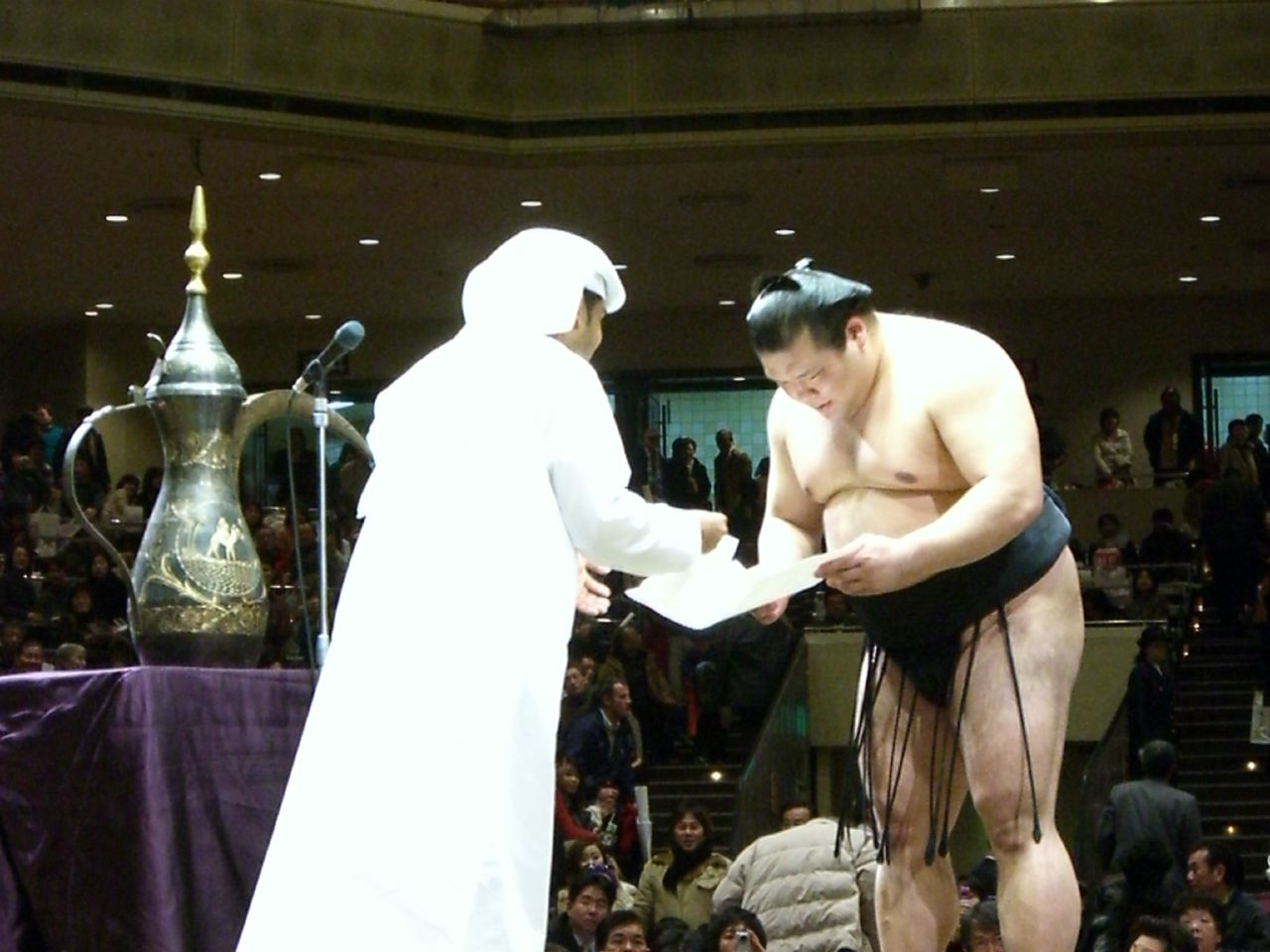
Tochiazuma during the presentation of trophies for his January 2006 yūshō.

Tochiazuma holds the record for the number of times a wrestler has achieved promotion to the ōzeki rank after being demoted. He lost his ōzeki rank twice following injuries, but both times he came back by scoring at least ten wins in the next tournament. He is the only wrestler who has succeeded in doing so since the introduction of the current rules on ōzeki promotion and demotion in 1969. His final promotion to ōzeki in 2005 was especially spectacular, as even his own stable had suggested that the scapula injury he suffered in November 2004 could have meant the end of his career.

He had great strength as well as technical skill, and was one of the few wrestlers to regularly trouble Asashōryū when he was at his peak as a yokozuna, defeating him six times between 2003 and 2006.

== Fighting style ==
Tochiazuma had an all-round style, equally adept at yotsu (grappling) techniques, and tsuki/oshi (thrusting and pushing) techniques. Early in his career he was regarded as an oshi-sumo specialist, and oshi-dashi (push out) was the kimarite he used most often overall, but he also won many bouts by yori-kiri or force out. His favourite grip on the mawashi was hidari-yotsu (right hand outside, left hand inside), and he was fond of using uwatenage (overarm throw) and uwatedashinage (pulling outer arm throw).

== Retirement from sumo ==
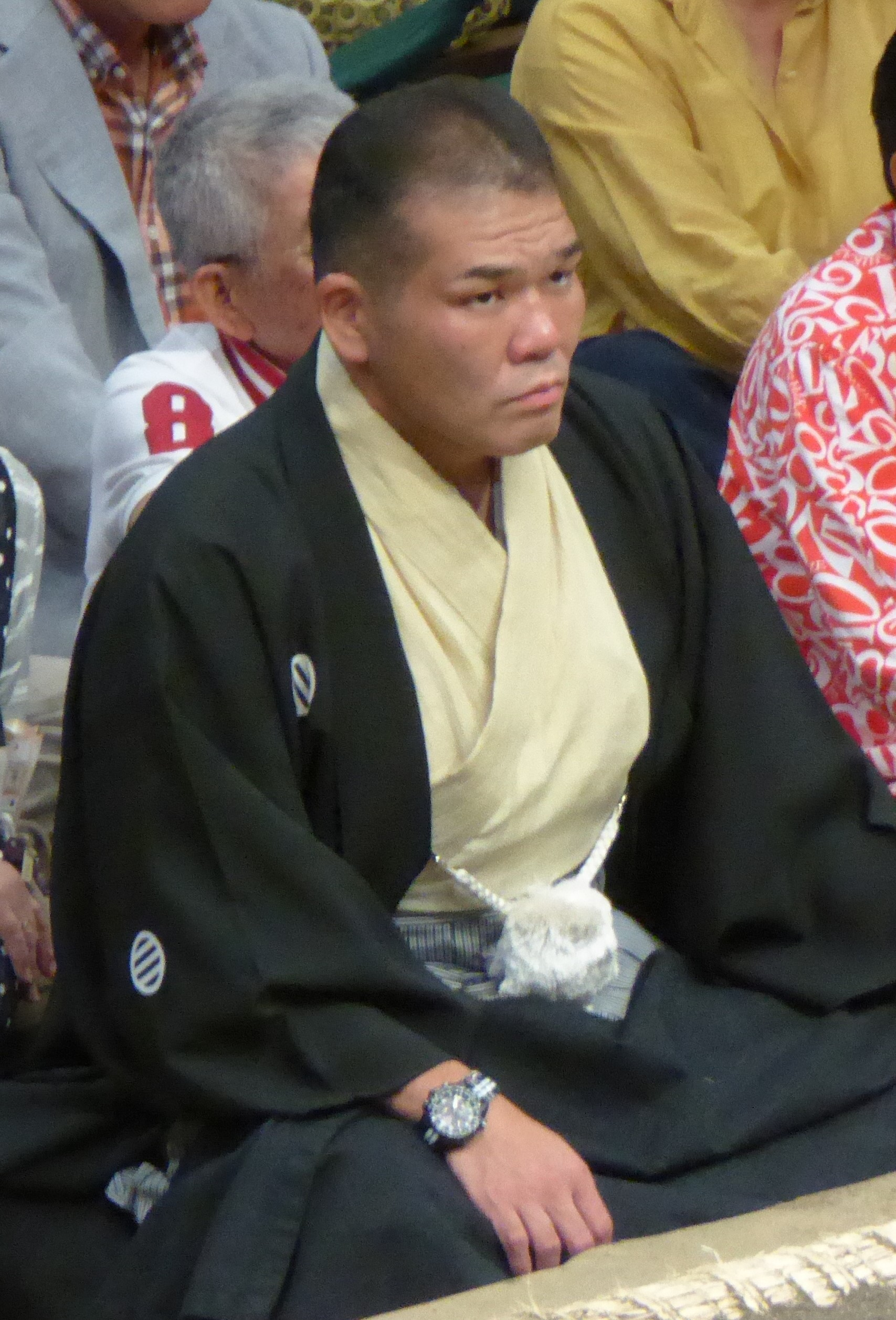
As a ringside judge in 2018

At the end of 2006, Tochiazuma underwent knee surgery, leaving him with little time to prepare for the 2007 New Year tournament. He managed only five wins there, but preserved his ōzeki status with eight wins in March. However, he pulled out of that tournament on the 12th day and was admitted to hospital, complaining of headaches and dizziness. He was diagnosed with high blood pressure and a brain scan revealed he had also suffered a mild stroke. On May 7, 2007, Tochiazuma announced his retirement from sumo. He kept his ring name as he made the transition into his role as oyakata, as ōzeki are permitted to do so for three years.

Tochiazuma's danpatsu-shiki, or official retirement ceremony, took place on 2 February 2008 at the Ryōgoku Kokugikan, with around 10,000 people in attendance. Coming from Tokyo, he naturally had a huge supporters network in the capital, and the event was a sell-out. He had lost a noticeable amount of weight since his retirement.

Upon his father's retirement in September 2009 he became Tamanoi-oyakata and took over the running of Tamanoi stable. In July 2011 he produced his first top division wrestler, Fujiazuma, and veteran Yoshiazuma also won promotion in the following tournament. In 2013 the Mongolian-born Azumaryū reached the top division, and he is the only sekitori in the stable as of 2017. Tamanoi-oyakata is also a Deputy Director of the Japan Sumo Association, responsible for the running of the regional tours or jungyō.

== Family ==
He was married in December 2008 to a 31-year-old former office worker and the reception was held in February 2009. Their first child, a daughter, was born in February 2012.

== Career record ==
Tochiazuma Daisuke
Year	January Hatsu basho, Tokyo	March Haru basho, Osaka	May Natsu basho, Tokyo	July Nagoya basho, Nagoya	September Aki basho, Tokyo	November Kyūshū basho, Fukuoka
1994	x	x	x	x	x	(Maezumō)
1995	West Jonokuchi #47; 4–0–3	East Jonokuchi #3; 7–0; Champion	East Jonidan #20; 7–0–PP; Champion	East Sandanme #32; 7–0–P; Champion	East Makushita #23; 3–4	West Makushita #31; 7–0; Champion
1996	West Makushita #3; 5–2	East Makushita #2; 5–2	East Jūryō #12; 10–5	East Jūryō #6; 10–5	West Jūryō #3; 12–3; Champion	West Maegashira #15; 10–5; F
1997	West Maegashira #10; 9–6	West Maegashira #4; 6–9	East Maegashira #6; 11–4; F	West Komusubi #2; 9–6; T	West Sekiwake #1; 10–5; T	East Sekiwake #1; 7–8
1998	West Sekiwake #1; 11–4; O	East Sekiwake #1; 2–4–9	West Maegashira #5; Sat out due to injury 0–0–15	West Maegashira #5; 8–7 ★	West Maegashira #1; 8–7	East Maegashira #1; 10–5; T★
1999	West Komusubi #1; 9–6	East Komusubi #1; 8–7	East Komusubi #1; 10–5	East Sekiwake #2; 6–9	East Maegashira #1; 10–5; O★★	West Sekiwake #1; 10–5; T
2000	West Sekiwake #1; 8–7	West Sekiwake #2; 8–7	West Sekiwake #1; 9–6	West Sekiwake #1; 12–3; T	East Sekiwake #1; 2–4–9	West Maegashira #4; Sat out due to injury 0–0–15
2001	West Maegashira #4; 10–5	East Komusubi #1; 9–6; O	West Sekiwake #1; 9–6	East Sekiwake #1; 10–5; T	East Sekiwake #1; 12–3	East Sekiwake #1; 12–3; T
2002	West Ōzeki #2; 13–2–P	East Ōzeki #1; 10–5	West Ōzeki #1; 10–5	East Ōzeki #2; 3–2–10	West Ōzeki #1; Sat out due to injury 0–0–15	East Ōzeki #3; 8–7
2003	East Ōzeki #2; 0–6–9	West Ōzeki #1; Sat out due to injury 0–0–15	West Ōzeki #2; 8–7	West Ōzeki #2; 7–8	West Ōzeki #2; 10–5	West Ōzeki #1; 13–2
2004	East Ōzeki #1; 9–6	East Ōzeki #2; 0–3–12	West Ōzeki #2; Sat out due to injury 0–0–15	West Sekiwake #2; 10–5	West Ōzeki #2; 2–2–11	West Ōzeki #2; 3–3–9
2005	West Sekiwake #2; 11–4	West Ōzeki #2; 10–5	West Ōzeki #1; 12–3	East Ōzeki #1; 9–6	West Ōzeki #1; 10–5	East Ōzeki #1; 2–2–11
2006	East Ōzeki #2; 14–1	East Ōzeki #1; 12–3	East Ōzeki #1; 2–5–8	West Ōzeki #3; 8–7	West Ōzeki #3; 9–6	East Ōzeki #2; 10–5
2007	West Ōzeki #1; 5–10	West Ōzeki #3; 8–4–3	West Ōzeki #2; Retired –	x	x	x
Record given as wins–losses–absences Top division champion Top division runner-up Retired Non-participation Jūryō Lower divisions Sanshō key: F=Fighting spirit; O=Outstanding performance; T=Technique Also shown: ★=Kinboshi; P=Playoff(s); Divisions: Makuuchi — Jūryō — Makushita — Sandanme — Jonidan — Jonokuchi Makuuchi ranks: Yokozuna — Ōzeki — Sekiwake — Komusubi — Maegashira

== See also ==
- List of sumo record holders
- List of sumo tournament top division champions
- List of sumo tournament top division runners-up
- List of sumo tournament second division champions
- Glossary of sumo terms
- List of past sumo wrestlers
- List of sumo elders
- List of ōzeki
