= Tōhakuryū Masahito =

Japanese sumo wrestler

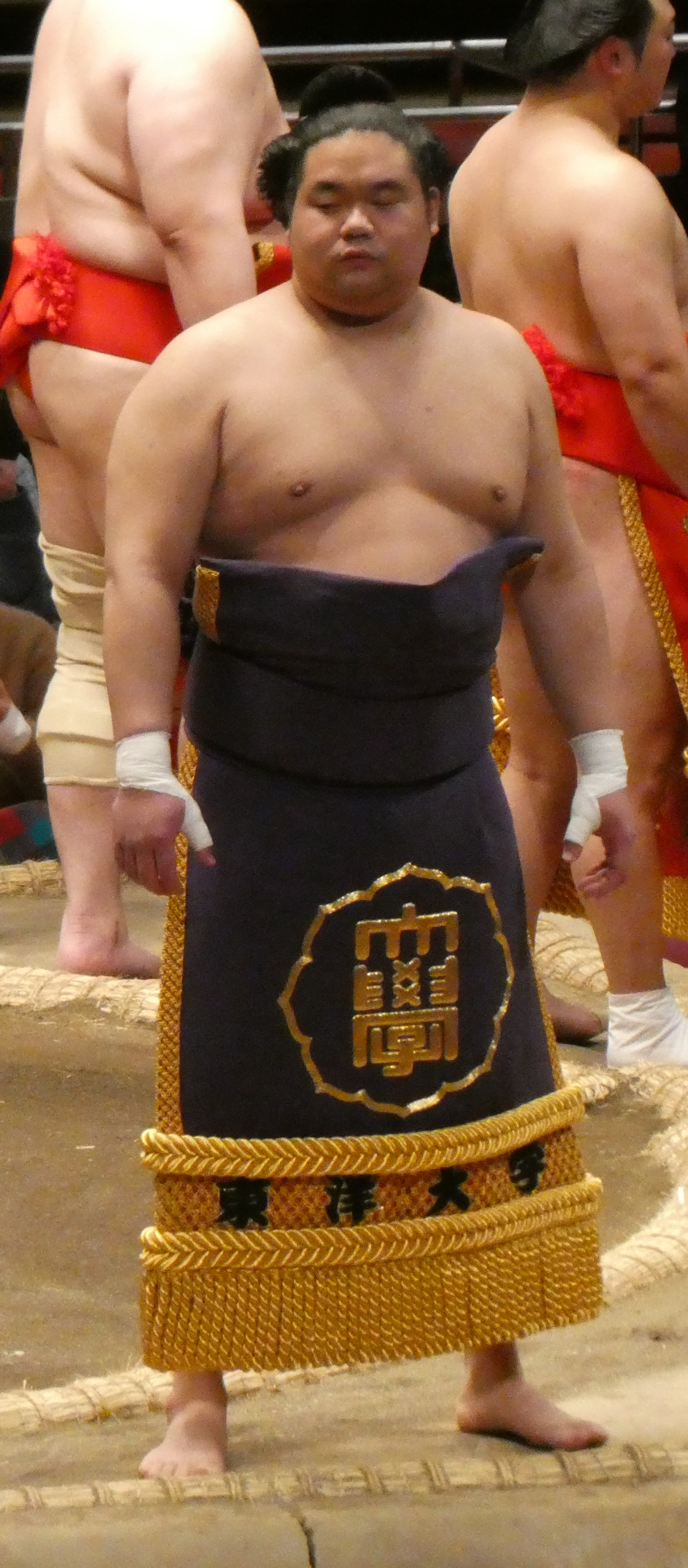

Personal information
- Native name: 東白龍 雅士
- Born: Shiraishi Masahito 白石 雅仁; 17 April 1996 (age 30) Sumida-ku, Tokyo, Japan
- Height: 180 cm (71 in)
- Weight: 131 kg (289 lb)

Sport
- Sport: Sumo
- Rank: see below
- University team: Toyo University
- Heya: Tamanoi
- Debut: May 2019
- Highest rank: Maegashira 15 (November 2023)
- Championships: 1 (Sandanme)
- Updated on October 29, 2023

Tōhakuryū Masahito (Japanese 東白龍 雅士, born April 17, 1996, as Masahito Shiraishi) is a professional Japanese sumo wrestler from Tokyo. Debuting in May 2019 as a sandanme tsukedashi, his highest rank is maegashira 15 and he currently wrestles for Tamanoi stable.

== Early career ==
Born in Tokyo, Shiraishi began sumo wrestling in the 4th grade of elementary school, going on to attend sumo classes at a dojo in Tokyo's Katsushika Ward. He attended Toyo University and in 2018 during his 4th year at the school, he won the individual division of the 97th All Japan Student Sumo Championship. Even though he was a skilled wrestler, he did not initially indicate interest in pursuing professional sumo, but he said that seeing the success of Takakeishō, whom he had wrestled with in elementary school, and Mitakeumi who had been his senior at Toyo University, encouraged him to join professional sumo. While still in school, he had been invited to a party at Tamanoi stable and as such, when he graduated from Toyo University in May 2019, he chose to join Tamanoi as a wrestler.

== Career ==
He made his debut as a sandanme tsukedashi entrant, beginning his career in the fourth highest sandanme division. A perfect 7–0 record saw him win the sandanme championship or yūshō in his first tournament.

Recording only one make-koshi or losing record on his way up the ranks, he had to sit out the September 2020 tournament after a COVID-19 outbreak at his stable, but he returned in November to earn promotion to the jūryō division after a 4–3 record at makushita 2.

Up until this point he had been fighting under his family name of Shiraishi, but to mark the occasion he was given a new shikona of Tōhakuryū. He recorded a solid 8–7 record in his debut at sekitori level in January 2021, and has remained in the division since then, reaching a highest rank of jūryō 2 in July 2022. He had to withdraw from Day 11 of that tournament after a COVID-19 outbreak at Tamanoi stable.

== Fighting style ==
According to his Japan Sumo Association profile, Tōhakuryū favours thrusting and pushing (tsuki/oshi) techniques. His most common winning kimarite are hatakikomi (slap down) and oshidashi (push out).

== Career record ==
Tōhakuryū Masahito
| Year | January Hatsu basho, Tokyo | March Haru basho, Osaka | May Natsu basho, Tokyo | July Nagoya basho, Nagoya | September Aki basho, Tokyo | November Kyūshū basho, Fukuoka |
|---|---|---|---|---|---|---|
| 2019 | x | x | Sandanme tsukedashi #100; 7–0; Champion | West Makushita #55; 5–2 | East Makushita #42; 4–3 | West Makushita #35; 6–1 |
| 2020 | West Makushita #13; 2–5 | East Makushita #29; 6–1 | West Makushita #10; Tournament Cancelled; State of Emergency; 0–0–0 | West Makushita #10; 6–1 | West Makushita #2; Sat out due to COVID rules 0–0–7 | West Makushita #2; 4–3 |
| 2021 | West Jūryō #14; 8–7 | East Jūryō #11; 7–8 | East Jūryō #11; 10–5 | East Jūryō #4; 5–10 | West Jūryō #7; 4–11 | East Jūryō #12; 9–6 |
| 2022 | East Jūryō #8; 10–5 | West Jūryō #3; 7–8 | West Jūryō #4; 9–6 | West Jūryō #2; 3–8–4 | West Jūryō #2; 8–7 | East Jūryō #1; 5–10 |
| 2023 | East Jūryō #4; 9–6 | West Jūryō #1; 7–8 | West Jūryō #2; 4–11 | West Jūryō #4; 7–8 | West Jūryō #4; 10–5 | East Maegashira #15; 5–10 |
| 2024 | West Jūryō #2; 8–7 | East Jūryō #2; 6–9 | East Jūryō #4; 6–9 | East Jūryō #5; 5–10 | East Jūryō #10; 8–7 | East Jūryō #6; 4–9–2 |
| 2025 | West Jūryō #11; 8–7 | West Jūryō #9; 7–8 | East Jūryō #10; 9–6 | East Jūryō #5; 7–8 | West Jūryō #6; 4–11 | West Jūryō #10; 7–8 |
| 2026 | West Jūryō #10; 7–8 | West Jūryō #10; 8–7 | East Jūryō #10; 6–9 | East Jūryō #12; 8–7 | West Jūryō #9; 8–7 | West Jūryō #8; 7–8 |
Record given as wins–losses–absences Top division champion Top division runner-up Retired Non-participation Jūryō Lower divisions Sanshō key: F=Fighting spirit; O=Outstanding performance; T=Technique Also shown: ★=Kinboshi; P=Playoff(s); Divisions: Makuuchi — Jūryō — Makushita — Sandanme — Jonidan — Jonokuchi Makuuchi ranks: Yokozuna — Ōzeki — Sekiwake — Komusubi — Maegashira

== See also ==
- Glossary of sumo terms
- List of active sumo wrestlers
