= Tochiazuma Tomoyori =

Japanese sumo wrestler

Personal information
- Native name: 栃東 知頼
- Born: Hayao Shiga; 3 September 1944 (age 82) Fukushima, Japan
- Height: 1.77 m (5 ft 9 1/2 in)
- Weight: 115 kg (254 lb)

Sport
- Sport: Sumo
- Retired: January, 1977
- Heya: Kasugano
- Record: 611-593-33
- Debut: November, 1960
- Highest rank: Sekiwake (March, 1970)
- Elder name: Tamanoi
- Championships: 1 (Makuuchi); 1 (Jūryō)
- Special Prizes: Outstanding Performance (4); Technique (6)
- Gold Stars: 5 Kashiwado (3); Taihō; Kitanofuji
- Updated on June 2020

Tochiazuma Tomoyori (born 3 September 1944 as Hayao Shiga) is a former sumo wrestler from Sōma, Fukushima Prefecture, Japan. His highest rank was sekiwake, which he held for one tournament in 1970. He won the top division championship in January 1972. After retirement he worked as a coach at his stable, Kasugano, until 1990 when he set up his own Tamanoi stable. He is the father of the former ōzeki Tochiazuma Daisuke, and upon his retirement as a coach in 2009 his son took over from him.

== Career ==
He made his debut in November 1960, joining the then recently retired yokozuna Tochinishiki's Kasugano stable. He reached jūryō in May 1965 and the top makuuchi division in March 1967. He was relatively small, standing only 177 cm tall and weighing around 110 kg. In May 1968 he was runner-up to Tamanoshima with a 10–5 record, earning promotion to komusubi. He also won the first of his six Ginō-shō or Technique Awards. He was runner-up once again in September of that year. He reached his highest rank of sekiwake in March 1970 but fell short with a 7–8 record.

He had the unusual experience in January 1971 of defeating a yokozuna on the opening day, and then losing 13 of his remaining 14 bouts, with his only other win being a walkover.

In January 1972, ranked at maegashira 5, he took his only top division yūshō or tournament championship. He needed only an 11–4 record to do so (13 or 14 wins are normally needed). The sole yokozuna at the time, Kitanofuji, withdrew after winning only seven matches, and the only ōzeki Tochiazuma faced was Kiyokuni on the final day. He won the match, avoiding the need for a playoff with Wajima, Kotozakura, Hasegawa, Fukunohana, Yoshioyama and Wakafutase who all finished runners up on 10–5. Had Kiyokuni won, he would have also been involved in an eight-way playoff.

After his tournament victory he was promoted back to komusubi but pulled out of the next tournament through injury and spent the rest of his career in the maegashira ranks. He was runner-up for a third time in May 1973, but was not really in contention for the championship during the tournament, finishing four wins behind the undefeated Wajima.

== Retirement from sumo ==
His son, Daisuke, was born in November 1976. Tochiazuma retired two months later, during the January 1977 tournament. He remained in sumo as an elder of the Japan Sumo Association, working as a coach at his old stable. In 1990, following the death of his old stablemaster, he decided to branch out and open up his own Tamanoi stable. The purpose-built heya has some of the best facilities in sumo today. His son joined the stable in 1994 and adopted his old shikona of Tochiazuma. His son won his first tournament championship in January 2002, exactly 30 years after Tamanoi Oyakata's own triumph, and retired in May 2007. He took over the running of the stable when Tamanoi reached the mandatory retirement age of 65 in September 2009. As of 2024 he is still coaching at Tamanoi stable.

== Career record ==
Tochiazuma Tomoyori
Year	January Hatsu basho, Tokyo	March Haru basho, Osaka	May Natsu basho, Tokyo	July Nagoya basho, Nagoya	September Aki basho, Tokyo	November Kyūshū basho, Fukuoka
1960	x	x	x	x	x	(Maezumo)
1961	East Jonokuchi #19; 4–3	West Jonidan #78; 4–3	West Jonidan #39; 4–3	East Jonidan #8; 3–4	West Jonidan #18; 5–2	East Sandanme #85; 4–3
1962	Sandanme #63; 4–3	East Sandanme #47; 6–1	East Sandanme #8; 4–3	East Makushita #90; 3–4	West Sandanme #2; 4–3	West Makushita #90; 3–4
1963	West Sandanme #2; 4–3	West Makushita #88; 3–4	West Sandanme #5; 7–0–P	West Makushita #31; 3–4	West Makushita #35; 4–3	West Makushita #28; 4–3
1964	West Makushita #23; 4–3	East Makushita #17; 0–7	East Makushita #48; 4–3	East Makushita #44; 5–2	West Makushita #33; 5–2	West Makushita #18; 4–3
1965	West Makushita #16; 6–1	West Makushita #5; 5–2	West Jūryō #18; 9–6	East Jūryō #12; 9–6	East Jūryō #6; 9–6	East Jūryō #3; 8–7
1966	West Jūryō #2; 3–12	East Jūryō #12; 11–4	East Jūryō #4; 7–4–4	West Jūryō #5; 3–6–6	East Jūryō #18; 11–4	East Jūryō #6; 9–6
1967	East Jūryō #3; 10–5	West Maegashira #14; 9–6	West Maegashira #9; 6–9	West Maegashira #11; 6–9	West Jūryō #2; 12–3; Champion	West Maegashira #8; 9–6
1968	West Maegashira #2; 5–10	East Maegashira #7; 10–5	West Maegashira #2; 10–5; OT★	East Komusubi #1; 5–10	West Maegashira #3; 11–4; OT★★	East Komusubi #1; 3–12
1969	East Maegashira #6; 9–6	East Maegashira #3; 7–8 ★	East Maegashira #4; 6–9	West Maegashira #7; 9–6	East Maegashira #2; 9–6; OT	East Komusubi #1; 8–7; T
1970	East Komusubi #1; 10–5; OT	East Sekiwake #1; 7–8	East Maegashira #1; Sat out due to injury 0–0–15	West Maegashira #11; 8–7	West Maegashira #5; 5–10	East Maegashira #9; 9–6
1971	East Maegashira #3; 2–13 ★	East Maegashira #10; 8–7	West Maegashira #9; 8–7	West Maegashira #4; 6–9	East Maegashira #8; 9–6	East Maegashira #2; 4–11
1972	West Maegashira #5; 11–4; T	East Komusubi #1; 3–9–3	East Maegashira #8; 10–5	East Maegashira #2; 5–10	West Maegashira #4; 8–7	East Maegashira #1; 4–6–5
1973	West Maegashira #8; 5–10	West Maegashira #12; 9–6	East Maegashira #9; 11–4	East Maegashira #1; 4–11	East Maegashira #7; 9–6	East Maegashira #3; 6–9
1974	East Maegashira #4; 5–10	East Maegashira #9; 9–6	West Maegashira #2; 4–11	East Maegashira #10; 9–6	East Maegashira #5; 8–7	West Maegashira #2; 5–10
1975	East Maegashira #7; 8–7	West Maegashira #5; 6–9	West Maegashira #7; 9–6	East Maegashira #3; 4–11	East Maegashira #8; 8–7	West Maegashira #5; 7–8
1976	West Maegashira #6; 7–8	West Maegashira #9; 8–7	East Maegashira #6; 5–10	East Maegashira #11; 9–6	East Maegashira #7; 8–7	East Maegashira #3; 2–13
1977	West Maegashira #13; Retired; 0–5	x	x	x	x	x
Record given as wins–losses–absences Top division champion Top division runner-up Retired Lower divisions Non-participation Sanshō key: F=Fighting spirit; O=Outstanding performance; T=Technique Also shown: ★=Kinboshi; P=Playoff(s); Divisions: Makuuchi — Jūryō — Makushita — Sandanme — Jonidan — Jonokuchi Makuuchi ranks: Yokozuna — Ōzeki — Sekiwake — Komusubi — Maegashira

== See also ==
- Glossary of sumo terms
- List of past sumo wrestlers
- List of sumo tournament top division champions
- List of sumo tournament top division runners-up
- List of sumo tournament second division champions
- List of sekiwake
