= Takamisugi Takakatsu =

Japanese sumo wrestler

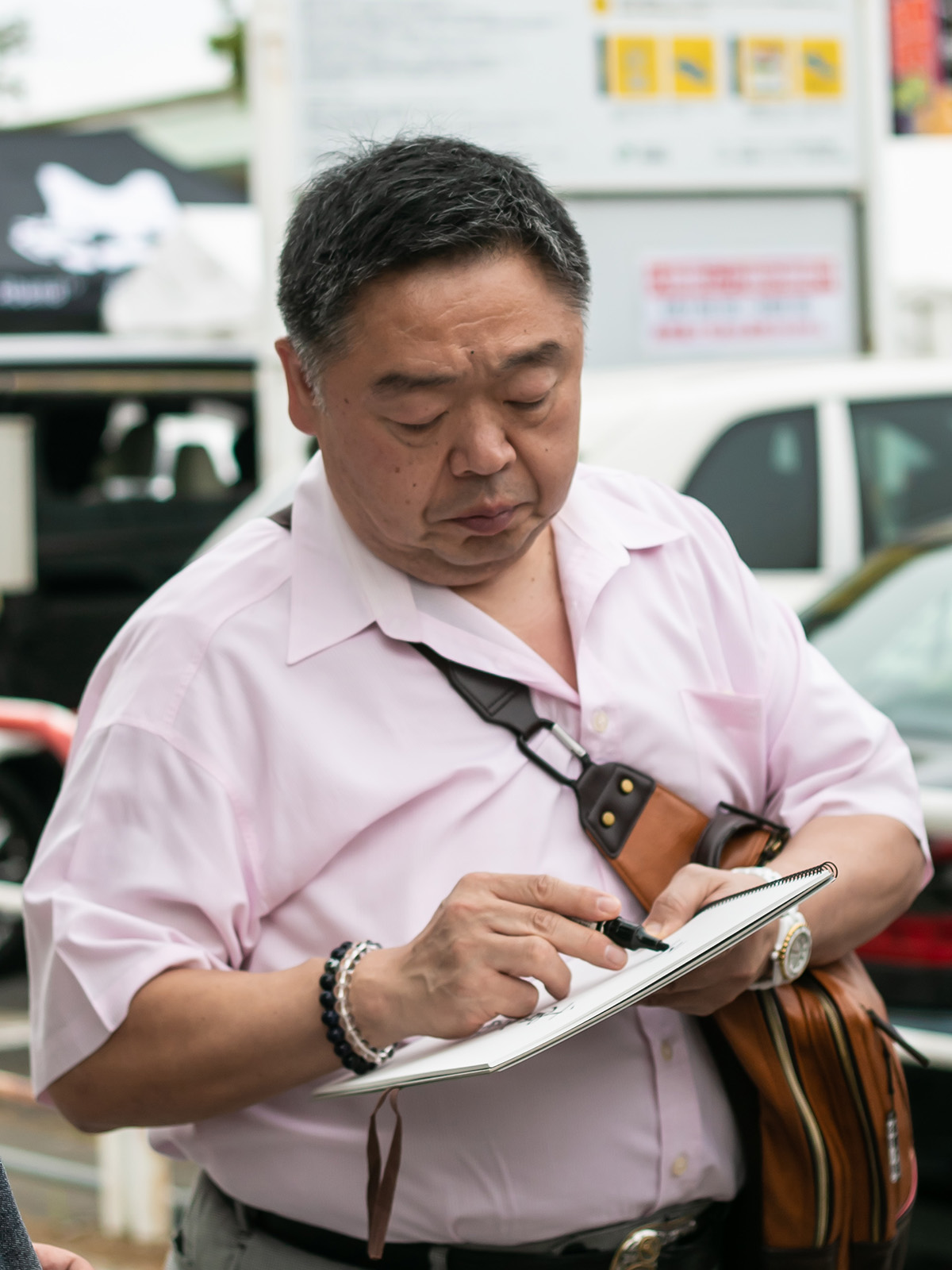

Personal information
- Native name: 隆三杉 太一
- Born: Takashi Kanao; 1 March 1961 (age 65) Kawasaki, Kanagawa, Japan
- Height: 1.79 m (5 ft 10 1/2 in)
- Weight: 150 kg (330 lb; 24 st)

Sport
- Sport: Sumo
- Retired: November, 1995
- Heya: Futagoyama
- Record: 720–753–57
- Debut: March, 1976
- Highest rank: Komusubi (January, 1991)
- Elder name: Tokiwayama
- Championships: 1 (Jūryō); 1 (Jonidan)
- Gold Stars: 1 (Ōnokuni)
- Updated on 27 November 2020

Takamisugi Takakatsu (born 1 March 1961 as Takashi Kanao) is a former sumo wrestler from Kawasaki, Kanagawa, Japan. His highest rank was komusubi. He was a stablemaster from 2016 until 2026.

== Career ==
Kanao practised judo in elementary and junior school, where he also excelled at painting and artwork. Because of his large size he also took part in team sumo competitions at school and regularly placed the team in the top three. Upon his graduation he joined Futagoyama stable in March 1976. It was a prestigious heya to join, as it was run by former yokozuna Wakanohana Kanji I and contained a number of top division stars including popular ōzeki Takanohana Kenshi.

Initially fighting under his own surname, Kanao adopted the shikona of Futagonishiki in 1977 but switched to Takamisugi two years later.

In November 1978 after just having been re-promoted to the fifth division, he won his first lower division championship, winning out in a rare ten-way playoff.

In January 1981, after five years in the unsalaried divisions, he reached sekitori level upon promotion to the second highest jūryō division, and he made the top makuuchi division just three tournaments later in July 1981. He initially struggled with injuries and after a number of setbacks, including a short spell back in the third makushita division, he made a top division kachi-koshi at the third attempt in January 1984, and established himself in makuuchi. He dropped back to jūryō in January 1987 but was re-promoted after winning the jūryō championship or yūshō in March with a 13–2 record. In November 1987 he defeated Ōnokuni in the latter's debut tournament as a yokozuna to earn his only kinboshi or gold star.

Takamisugi remained a rank-and file maegashira for nearly all his top division career. Although he reached komusubi twice, in January 1991 and January 1993, he recorded a losing score on both occasions. He holds the record for the most top division tournaments without ever winning a special prize, at 71. In 1993 his stable merged with Fujishima stable and he became a stablemate of ōzeki (later yokozuna) Takanohana Kōji, whom he had fought eight times previously without beating. In November 1995 he fell into jūryō once more and announced his retirement at the age of 34 after losing his first three matches.

== Retirement from sumo ==
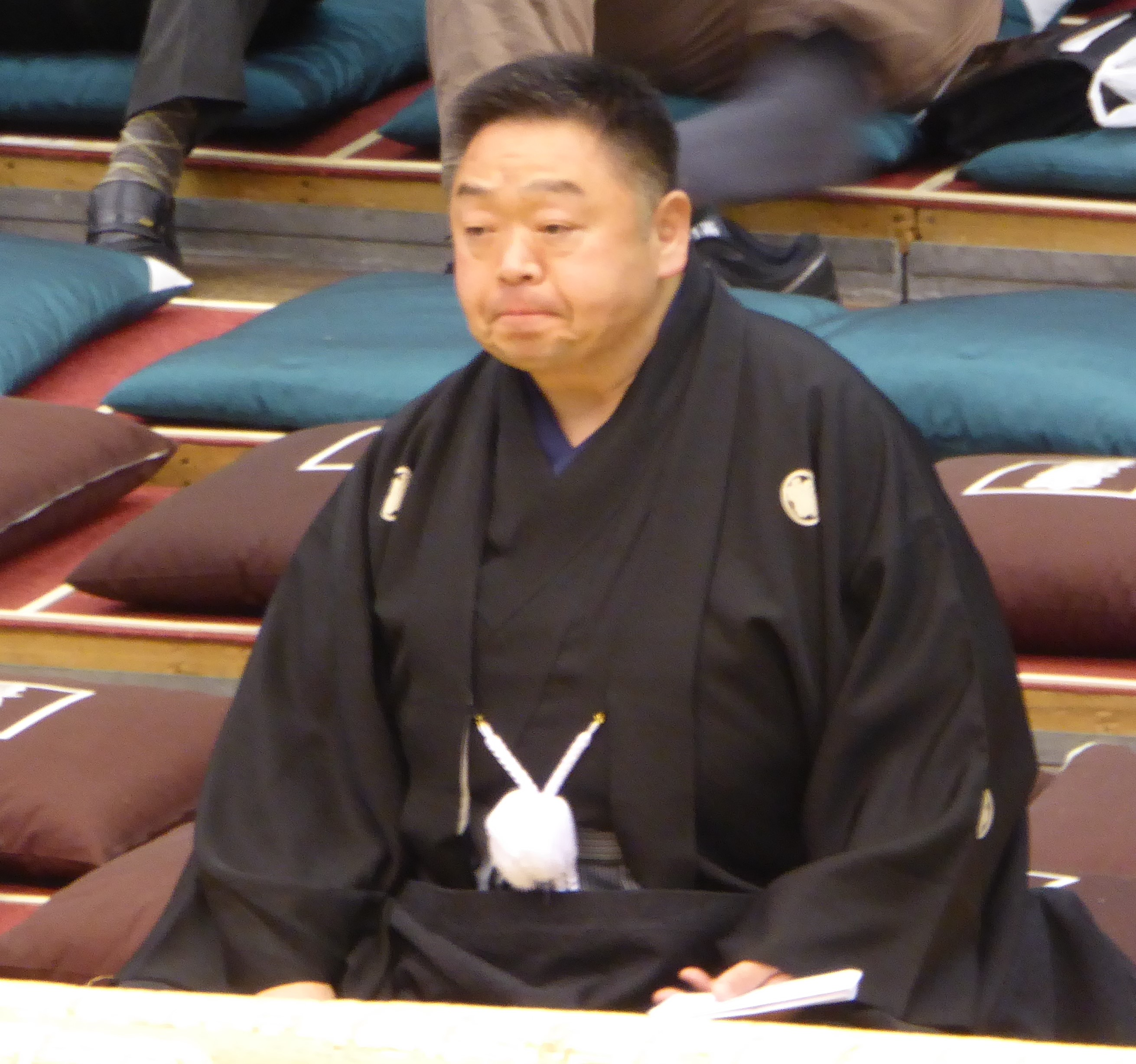
As a ringside judge in 2017

He remained in sumo as a coach at Futagoyama stable (later renamed Takanohana stable). Unable to purchase toshiyori kabu or elder stock, he borrowed elder names instead. He was known as Fujishima (until the retirement of stablemate Wakanohana Masaru), then Otowayama (until the retirement of Takanonami) and then Tokiwayama. Along with five other oyakata (Magaki, Ōnomatsu, Otowayama, Ōtake and Futagoyama), he was forced to leave the Nishonoseki ichimon or group of stables in January 2010 after declaring his support for his former stablemate Takanohana's unsanctioned bid to be elected to the board of directors of the Sumo Association. In April 2016 he took over the running of the Chiganoura stable upon the retirement of the previous head, ex-sekiwake Masudayama. In October 2018 he became the head coach of Takakeishō and other wrestlers formerly of the defunct Takanohana stable. Takakeishō won the tournament championship in November 2018 and was promoted to ōzeki the following year, although he had to pull out of his ōzeki debut tournament in May 2019 with an injury. Chiganoura apologized to the Sumo Association for Takakeishō's decision to re-enter the tournament only to have to withdraw once again, and made sure Takakeishō did not appear at the stable's end of tournament party. In November 2020, as former Chiganoura owner Masudayama's retirement approached, as part of a previous agreement, former Takamisugi and former Masudayama swapped back their elder names, and former Takamisugi changed the name of the stable to his original elder name, Tokiwayama.

In July 2021 he was demoted to the lowest rung in the Sumo Association's hierarchy of toshiyori after his wrestler Takagenji was dismissed from sumo for cannabis use.

In January 2026, ahead of his 65th birthday, Takamisugi transferred Tokiwayama stable to the former Takakeishō. The stable became Minatogawa stable.

== Personal life ==
He is often called upon to sing at sumo functions. His nickname when active was Doraemon because of his facial resemblance to the popular manga/anime character. His wife is a former disc jockey.

== Fighting style ==
Takamisugi liked a solid frontal pushing attack, and relied almost exclusively on oshisumo and tsuppari (thrusting). The push out or oshidashi was the winning kimarite in nearly half his sekitori matches. He usually lost if his opponents were able to grab hold of his mawashi or belt. He very rarely employed throwing moves; his most common throw was the beltless kotenage, or armlock throw.

== Career record ==
Takamisugi Takakatsu
Year	January Hatsu basho, Tokyo	March Haru basho, Osaka	May Natsu basho, Tokyo	July Nagoya basho, Nagoya	September Aki basho, Tokyo	November Kyūshū basho, Fukuoka
1976	x	(Maezumo)	East Jonokuchi #16; 4–3	East Jonidan #91; 2–5	East Jonidan #112; 6–1	West Jonidan #45; 4–3
1977	West Jonidan #21; 4–3	West Sandanme #84; 2–5	West Jonidan #16; 3–4	West Jonidan #28; 5–2	West Sandanme #89; 4–3	East Sandanme #69; 1–6
1978	East Jonidan #9; 5–2	East Sandanme #62; 5–2	West Sandanme #28; 2–5	East Sandanme #52; 3–4	West Sandanme #66; 1–1–5	East Jonidan #11; 6–1–PPPP; Champion
1979	East Sandanme #47; 5–2	East Sandanme #20; 5–2	East Makushita #59; 4–3	West Makushita #48; 3–4	West Makushita #59; 4–3	West Makushita #47; 5–2
1980	West Makushita #26; 5–2	East Makushita #17; 5–2	West Makushita #6; 4–3	West Makushita #4; 3–4	East Makushita #9; 5–2	East Makushita #4; 5–2
1981	West Jūryō #13; 10–5	West Jūryō #4; 8–7	West Jūryō #1; 8–7	West Maegashira #12; 6–9	West Jūryō #1; 8–7	East Maegashira #10; 0–4–11
1982	West Jūryō #7; Sat out due to injury 0–0–15	West Jūryō #7; 7–8	West Jūryō #10; 9–6	East Jūryō #4; 10–5	West Maegashira #12; 5–10	West Jūryō #4; 6–9
1983	East Jūryō #9; 5–10	East Makushita #4; 4–3	West Makushita #2; 6–1	West Jūryō #10; 9–6	West Jūryō #6; 9–6	West Jūryō #3; 10–5
1984	West Maegashira #13; 8–7	East Maegashira #10; 8–7	East Maegashira #5; 5–10	East Maegashira #12; 9–6	West Maegashira #5; 4–11	West Maegashira #13; 8–7
1985	East Maegashira #11; 8–7	West Maegashira #8; 8–7	East Maegashira #4; 5–10	East Maegashira #10; 8–7	East Maegashira #5; 5–10	East Maegashira #12; 8–7
1986	West Maegashira #8; 8–7	East Maegashira #5; 6–9	West Maegashira #10; 8–7	West Maegashira #6; 9–6	East Maegashira #1; Sat out due to injury 0–0–15	East Maegashira #14; 7–8
1987	East Jūryō #2; 6–9	East Jūryō #7; 13–2; Champion	West Jūryō #1; 8–7	West Maegashira #13; 9–6	East Maegashira #7; 8–7	East Maegashira #1; 3–12 ★
1988	West Maegashira #12; 9–6	West Maegashira #5; 8–7	East Maegashira #2; 3–12	West Maegashira #11; 10–5	East Maegashira #3; 5–10	East Maegashira #8; 8–7
1989	West Maegashira #3; 6–9	West Maegashira #6; 6–9	East Maegashira #9; 8–7	West Maegashira #6; 5–10	West Maegashira #12; 8–7	West Maegashira #8; 5–10
1990	West Maegashira #12; 9–6	West Maegashira #7; 6–9	East Maegashira #10; 8–7	West Maegashira #6; 8–7	East Maegashira #2; 6–9	East Maegashira #6; 9–6
1991	West Komusubi #1; 2–13	West Maegashira #11; 9–6	East Maegashira #5; 5–10	West Maegashira #11; 9–6	West Maegashira #7; 8–7	West Maegashira #4; 5–10
1992	West Maegashira #12; 8–7	East Maegashira #7; 7–8	West Maegashira #8; 8–7	West Maegashira #5; 7–8	East Maegashira #7; 9–6	West Maegashira #1; 8–7
1993	West Komusubi #1; 4–11	East Maegashira #6; 8–7	West Maegashira #2; 5–10	East Maegashira #7; 7–8	West Maegashira #8; 8–7	West Maegashira #3; 4–11
1994	West Maegashira #10; 7–8	West Maegashira #4; 5–10	West Maegashira #10; 7–8	West Maegashira #12; 9–6	East Maegashira #6; 6–9	East Maegashira #11; 6–9
1995	West Maegashira #15; 8–7	East Maegashira #14; 10–5	West Maegashira #2; 4–11	East Maegashira #9; 6–9	West Maegashira #12; 2–13	West Jūryō #7; Retired; 0–4
Record given as wins–losses–absences Top division champion Top division runner-up Retired Lower divisions Non-participation Sanshō key: F=Fighting spirit; O=Outstanding performance; T=Technique Also shown: ★=Kinboshi; P=Playoff(s); Divisions: Makuuchi — Jūryō — Makushita — Sandanme — Jonidan — Jonokuchi Makuuchi ranks: Yokozuna — Ōzeki — Sekiwake — Komusubi — Maegashira

== See also ==
- Glossary of sumo terms
- List of sumo tournament second division champions
- List of past sumo wrestlers
- List of sumo elders
- List of komusubi
