= Takanoshō Nobuaki =

Japanese sumo wrestler

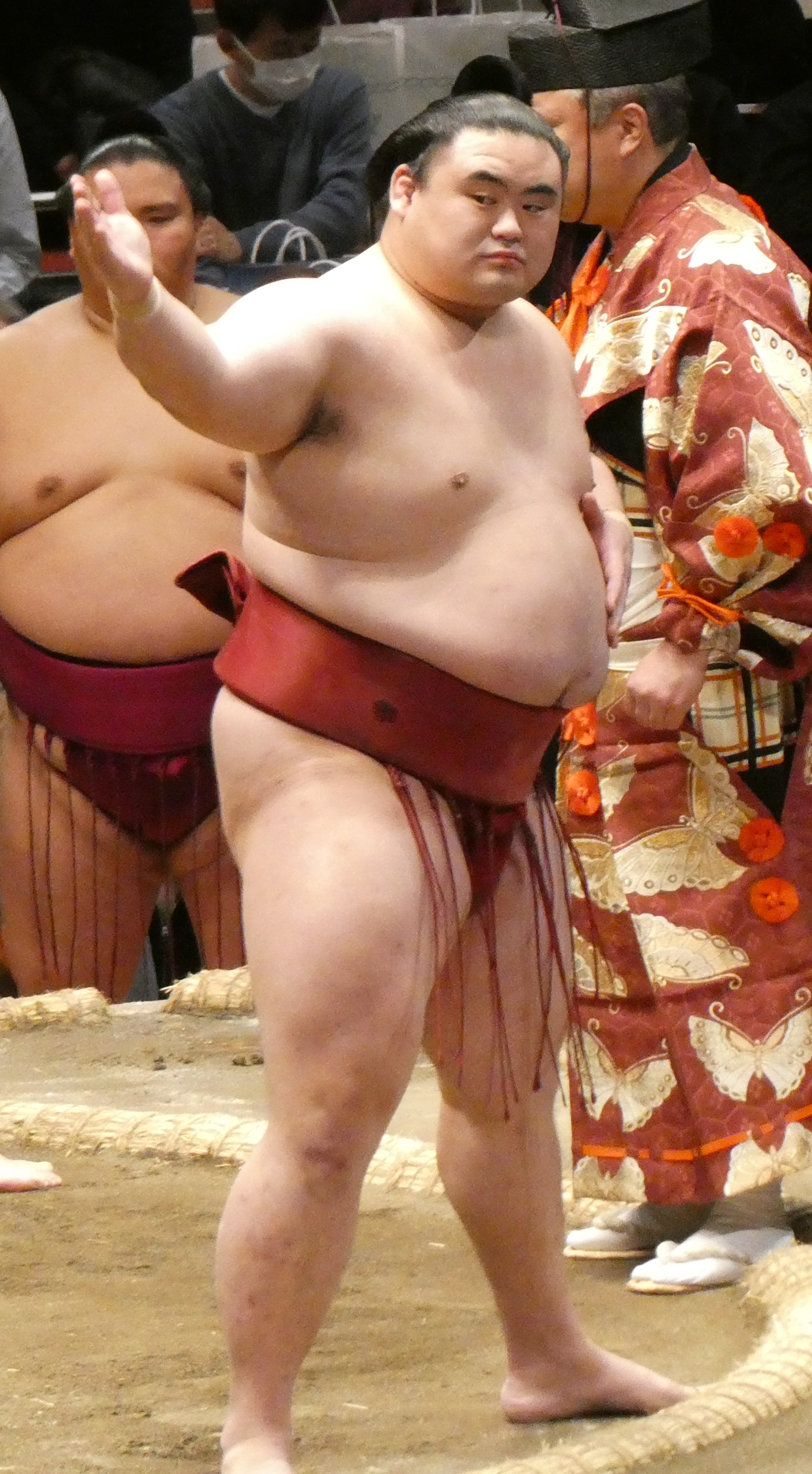

Personal information
- Native name: 隆の勝 伸明
- Born: Nobuaki Ishii; November 14, 1994 (age 32) Kashiwa, Chiba, Japan
- Height: 1.84 m (6 ft 1/2 in)
- Weight: 176 kg (388 lb; 27.7 st)

Sport
- Sport: Sumo
- Rank: see below
- Heya: Minatogawa
- Debut: March 2010
- Highest rank: Sekiwake (November 2020)
- Special Prizes: Fighting Spirit (5); Outstanding Performance (1)
- Gold Stars: 3 (Terunofuji)
- Updated on March 9, 2026

Takanoshō Nobuaki (Japanese: 隆の勝 伸明; born 14 November 1994 as Nobuaki Ishii (石井 伸明, Ishii Nobuaki)) is a Japanese professional sumo wrestler from Kashiwa, Chiba. He made his professional debut in March 2010, reaching the top makuuchi division in September 2018. His highest rank has been sekiwake. He has won three prizes for Fighting Spirit and one for Outstanding Performance. He has three gold stars for defeating a yokozuna while ranked as a maegashira and has been a runner-up in three top division tournaments. He wrestles for Minatogawa stable (the former Tokiwayama stable).

== Career ==
Takanoshō was the fourth of six children, and it was noted early on that he had the physique for sumo, being much bigger than all his siblings. He took part in a local sumo tournament in his first year of elementary school, and in junior high he represented Chiba Prefecture in the team competition at the National Junior High School Sumo Championships. Future makuuchi wrestler Daishōhō was on the same team. Upon graduating from junior high he entered Chiganoura stable (since renamed), run by ex-sekiwake Masudayama. He took the shikona of Masunoshō (舛ノ勝) and made his debut in March 2010. He was a member of the same entry class as Kagayaki and Chiyonoō. He reached the sandanme division in July 2011, and the makushita division in May 2012. In 2014 he twice fell back to sandanme but returned immediately both times, and had established himself as a makushita regular by January 2015. In April 2016 his stablemaster retired and the stable moved to the Takanohana ichimon, with former komusubi Takamisugi taking over as head coach. In January 2017, he changed the spelling of his shikona name to 舛の勝. Benefiting from increased training opportunities at the Takanohana and Ōnomatsu stables, he earned promotion to the sekitori ranks with a 6–1 record at makushita 3 in September 2017. To mark the occasion he changed his shikona to Takanoshō, reflecting his change of stablemaster. He was the first wrestler from Kashiwa to win promotion to the jūryō division since Kirinji 44 years earlier.

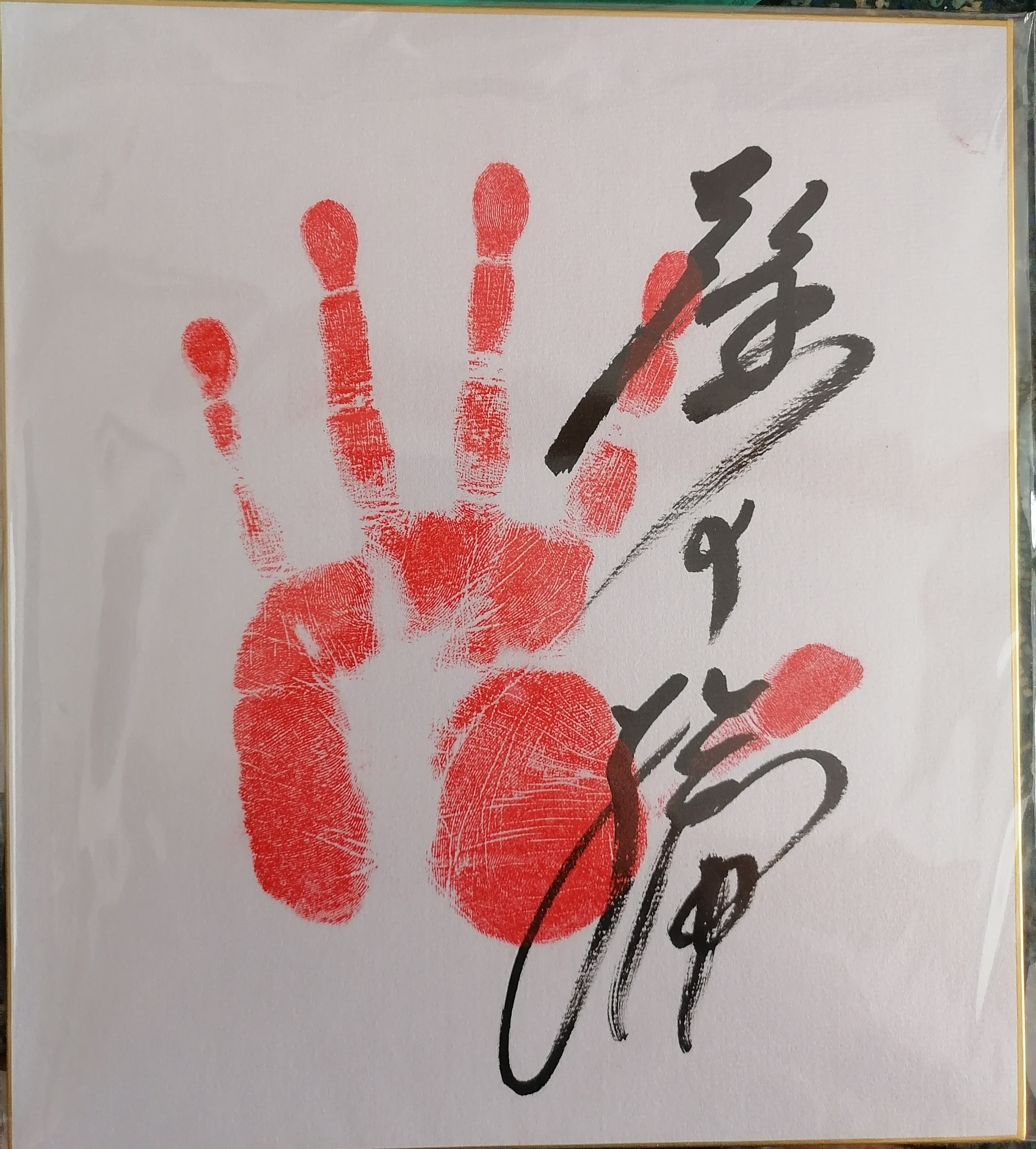
Original tegata (handprint and signature ) of sumo wrestler Takanosho

Takanoshō came through with a winning record in his jūryō debut in November 2017, and in July 2018 scored 13 wins against two losses from jūryō 4, although he lost a playoff for the championship to Takanoiwa. He was the first wrestler to win 13 bouts in jūryō and not take the championship since Ichinojō in July 2014. Nevertheless, he was promoted to the top makuuchi division for the following September 2018 tournament. He told a press conference that previously makuuchi was just a world seen on TV, and he was glad to see his name in the top part of the banzuke. His stablemaster said he hoped that Takanoshō would eventually reach san'yaku. In his makuuchi debut he was aiming for double-digit wins and the Fighting Spirit special prize, but this became impossible after his sixth loss on Day 13, and he ended the tournament with an 8–7 record. (This became the first tournament since special prizes were introduced in 1947 that none were awarded at all.) He produced a disappointing 4–11 record in November 2018 and was demoted back to jūryō. In January 2019 he suffered a right anterior cruciate ligament injury and he pulled out on Day 3, only to attempt a comeback on Day 9. However, he ended up withdrawing again on Day 11. He fell to jūryō 13 in March but returned from injury with an 11–4 record. He won promotion back to the top division after the September 2019 tournament, and produced an excellent 10–5 record in November. This saw him promoted to a career-high rank of maegashira 9 for the January 2020 tournament. In March he produced his best score in the top division to date, finishing joint runner-up with Kakuryū on 12–3. He was awarded his first special prize, for Fighting Spirit. In the November 2020 tournament he made his san'yaku debut at sekiwake, and came through with a winning record of 8–7. In December he revealed that he was again having problems with the anterior cruciate ligament injury in his right knee, for which surgery was recommended, but he planned to resume training instead. He maintained his sekiwake rank with winning records in January and March 2021, but a 5–10 record in May saw him fall back to the maegashira ranks. In November 2021 he earned a share of the Fighting Spirit prize by defeating Abi on Day 15 to finish with an 11–4 record. This saw at sekiwake rank for the fifth time for the January 2022 tournament, although a 7–8 record meant he fell to komusubi in March, his first time at that rank.

Takanoshō earned his first kinboshi, or gold star, in the May 2022 tournament by defeating yokozuna Terunofuji. He led the field outright until losing to Wakatakakage on Day 13, and was still in contention for the championship on the final day, although he was defeated by Sadanoumi and had to settle for a share of second place, one win behind Terunofuji. He was awarded his first Outstanding Performance Prize.

Takanoshō pulled out of the November 2023 tournament after appearing to suffer an injury to his right knee in his Day 10 match against Myōgiryū. His medical certificate submitted to the Sumo Association reported a damaged right meniscus and ACL. Stablemaster Tokiwayama said Takanoshō would likely not re-enter the tournament, stating that he had trouble walking and was in no condition to wrestle.

During the March 2024 tournament, Takanoshō stood out by recording his second kinboshi on Terunofuji by beating the yokozuna on Day 6.

Takanoshō withdrew from the September 2026 tournament after the thirteenth day, citing, among other things, a ligament injury to his left ankle sustained during his twelfth match against Kotoeihō, which required one month of treatment.

== Fighting style ==
Takanoshō is an oshi-sumo wrestler, who prefers to push and thrust at his opponents rather than grapple with the mawashi or belt. His most common winning kimarite or technique is oshi-dashi, a straightforward push out.

== Personal life ==
He is a fan of the band One Ok Rock and got to meet them after they performed in Fukuoka Prefecture on 27 November 2019, where Takanoshō was on a regional sumo tour.

In July 2024 Takanoshō announced that he had married a woman three years his junior from Misawa, Aomori that he met through an acquaintance while competing in the makushita division.

== Career record ==
Takanoshō Nobuaki
Year	January Hatsu basho, Tokyo	March Haru basho, Osaka	May Natsu basho, Tokyo	July Nagoya basho, Nagoya	September Aki basho, Tokyo	November Kyūshū basho, Fukuoka
2010	x	(Maezumō)	East Jonokuchi #17; 4–3	West Jonidan #103; 5–2	West Jonidan #55; 5–2	West Jonidan #13; 2–5
2011	West Jonidan #52; 4–3	West Jonidan #26; Tournament Cancelled; Match fixing investigation 0–0–0	West Jonidan #26; 5–2	West Sandanme #75; 5–2	West Sandanme #45; 3–4	East Sandanme #62; 5–2
2012	East Sandanme #36; 5–2	West Sandanme #10; 4–3	East Makushita #60; 4–3	West Makushita #51; 4–3	West Makushita #44; 4–3	East Makushita #36; 3–4
2013	West Makushita #44; 6–1	East Makushita #18; 3–4	East Makushita #28; 4–3	East Makushita #23; 2–5	East Makushita #40; 3–4	West Makushita #46; 2–5
2014	East Sandanme #1; 4–3	East Makushita #53; 4–3	East Makushita #46; 4–3	West Makushita #38; 3–4	East Makushita #48; 2–5	East Sandanme #11; 5–2
2015	East Makushita #48; 6–1	East Makushita #20; 5–2	East Makushita #12; 2–5	West Makushita #29; 5–2	West Makushita #14; 2–5	East Makushita #32; 4–3
2016	East Makushita #26; 4–3	East Makushita #22; 5–2	East Makushita #11; 3–4	East Makushita #17; 4–3	West Makushita #13; 5–2	East Makushita #6; 2–5
2017	East Makushita #15; 5–2	East Makushita #8; 4–3	West Makushita #6; 4–3	East Makushita #5; 4–3	East Makushita #3; 6–1	West Jūryō #13; 9–6
2018	East Jūryō #9; 9–6	West Jūryō #6; 8–7	West Jūryō #3; 7–8	East Jūryō #4; 13–2–P	East Maegashira #14; 8–7	West Maegashira #13; 4–11
2019	West Jūryō #2; 2–4–9	East Jūryō #13; 11–4	East Jūryō #4; 7–8	West Jūryō #4; 9–6	East Jūryō #2; 10–5	West Maegashira #12; 10–5
2020	East Maegashira #9; 7–8	East Maegashira #9; 12–3; F	East Maegashira #2; Tournament Cancelled; State of Emergency; 0–0–0	East Maegashira #2; 8–7	West Maegashira #1; 10–5	West Sekiwake #1; 8–7
2021	West Sekiwake #1; 9–6	West Sekiwake #1; 8–7	West Sekiwake #1; 5–10	East Maegashira #2; 8–7	West Maegashira #1; 7–8	West Maegashira #2; 11–4; F
2022	West Sekiwake #1; 7–8	East Komusubi #1; 4–11	West Maegashira #4; 11–4; O★	West Maegashira #1; 1–6–8	West Maegashira #10; 8–7	East Maegashira #9; 7–8
2023	East Maegashira #9; 6–9	West Maegashira #11; 8–7	West Maegashira #8; 7–8	East Maegashira #9; 8–7	East Maegashira #4; 6–9	West Maegashira #6; 5–6–4
2024	East Maegashira #12; 10–5	West Maegashira #3; 5–10 ★	East Maegashira #8; 8–7	East Maegashira #6; 12–3–P; F★	East Maegashira #1; 4–11	East Maegashira #6; 11–4; F
2025	East Maegashira #1; 6–9	West Maegashira #3; 3–12	West Maegashira #12; 8–7	East Maegashira #11; 9–6	East Maegashira #7; 12–3; F	East Komusubi #1; 5–10
2026	East Maegashira #3; 5–10	West Maegashira #4; 9–6	West Maegashira #1; 7–8	West Maegashira #1; 6–9	East Maegashira #4; 4–9–2	East Maegashira #11; 10–5
Record given as wins–losses–absences Top division champion Top division runner-up Retired Non-participation Jūryō Lower divisions Sanshō key: F=Fighting spirit; O=Outstanding performance; T=Technique Also shown: ★=Kinboshi; P=Playoff(s); Divisions: Makuuchi — Jūryō — Makushita — Sandanme — Jonidan — Jonokuchi Makuuchi ranks: Yokozuna — Ōzeki — Sekiwake — Komusubi — Maegashira

== See also ==
- Glossary of sumo terms
- List of active sumo wrestlers
- List of active gold star earners
- List of active special prize winners
- List of sumo top division runners-up
- List of sekiwake
