= Minatogawa stable =

Japanese stable of sumo wrestlers

Coordinates: 35.7240°N 139.8064°E

Minatogawa stable (湊川部屋, Minatogawa-beya) is a stable of sumo wrestlers, part of the Nishonoseki ichimon or group of stables. The stable was opened in 2004 as Chiganoura stable (千賀ノ浦部屋, Chiganoura-beya). It became Tokiwayama stable (常盤山部屋, Tokiwayama-beya) in 2020, before changing to its current name when former ōzeki Takakeishō took over as the stablemaster in January 2026.

As of May 2026, the stable has 9 active wrestlers.

== History ==
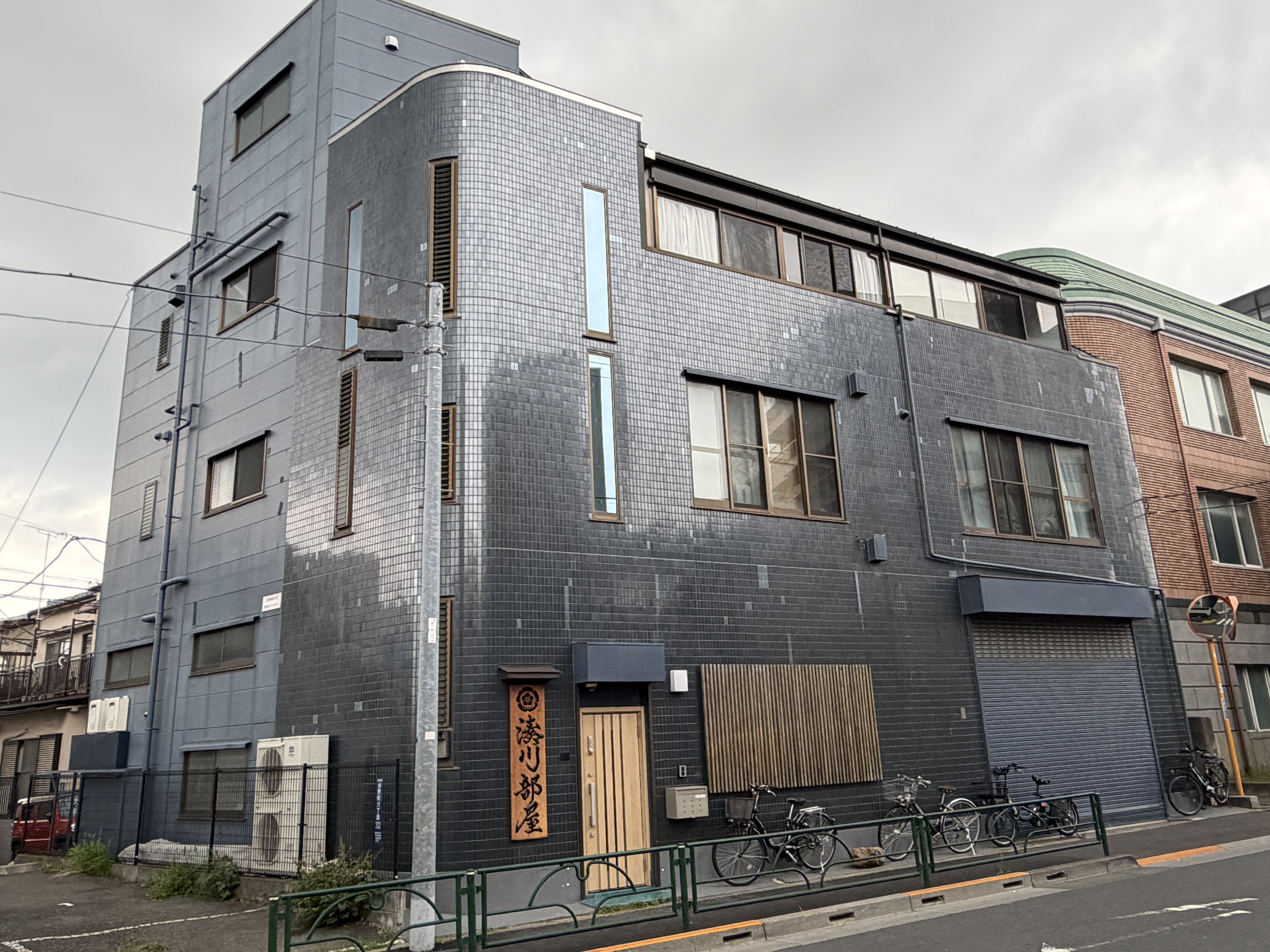

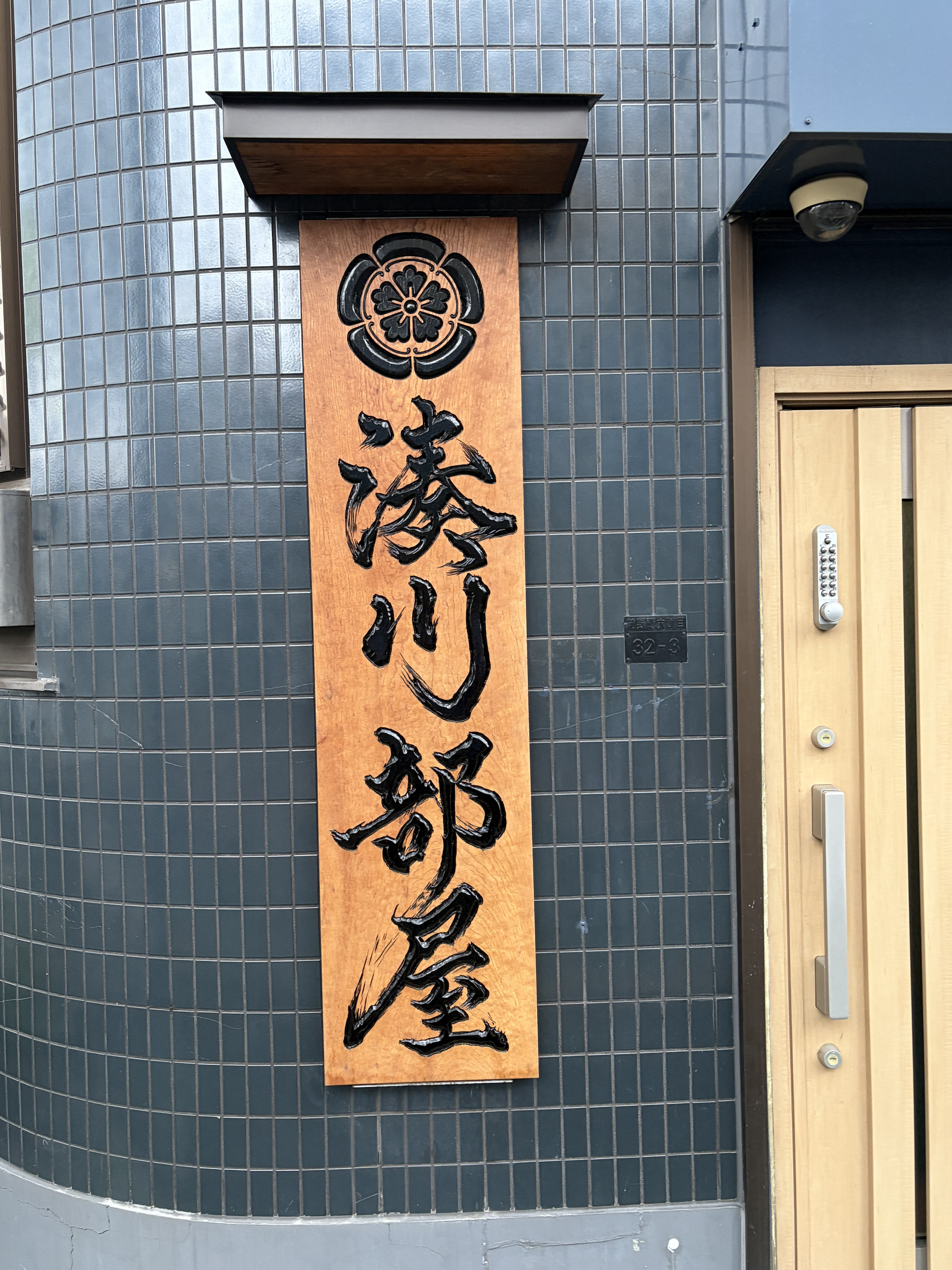

The stable was founded as Chiganoura stable in September 2004 by former sekiwake Masudayama, who branched off from Kasugano stable of the Dewanoumi ichimon at the unusually late age of 53, after he lost out to Tochinowaka in his bid to take over Kasugano stable. He took four wrestlers with him from Kasugano stable, the last of whom, Burinosato, retired in March 2019. In April 2016 the former Takamisugi took over the running of the stable when Masudayama reached the mandatory retirement age of 65, and aligned the stable with the Takanohana ichimon, leaving the Dewanoumi ichimon. The former Chiganoura changed to Tokiwayama and was re-employed by the stable as a consultant for five years. In June 2018 the Takanohana ichimon dissolved and Chiganoura joined the Ōnomatsu group, with Masudayama choosing to be unaffiliated. In September, the stable joined the Nishonoseki group and on 1 October Chiganoura adopted the wrestlers and staff from the defunct Takanohana stable following the resignation of Takanohana from the Japan Sumo Association. In November Takakeishō won the top division championship in his first tournament for his new stable, and in March 2019 he was promoted to ōzeki. In November 2020, as Masudayama's retirement approached, as part of a previous agreement, Takamisugi and former Masudayama swapped back their elder names, and former Takamisugi changed the name of the stable to his original elder name, Tokiwayama.

Until 2021 it was located in Taitō nearby the Sensō-ji temple, and operated out of the same building as the old Takasago stable, before it merged with the Wakamatsu stable. In February 2021 the stable moved to new premises in Maeno-chō, Itabashi ward, with the old premises taken over by Tatsunami stable.

It was home to the only Hungarian in professional sumo, Masutōō, who was on the podium at the 2004 Junior Sumo World Championships alongside Tochinoshin, Gōeidō and Kaisei but did not progress beyond the makushita division in professional sumo.

In November 2025 the Sumo Association approved the transfer of Tokiwayama stable to the former Takakeishō ahead of Takamisugi's 65th birthday, which is the mandatory retirement age in professional sumo. On 26 January 2026, the stable name changed to Minatogawa stable. Most of Tokiwayama stable's support personnel were set to transfer to other stables.

== Ring name conventions ==
Many wrestlers at this stable take ring names or shikona that begin with the character 舛 (read: masu), in deference to their former coach and the stable's founder, the former Masudayama. Examples include Masunoshō, Masutoo and Masutenryū. However, when Masunoshō was promoted to the jūryō division after the September 2017 tournament his shikona was changed to Takanoshō, after the new head coach Takamisugi.

== Owner ==
- 2026–present: Minatogawa Takanobu (iin taigu toshiyori, ōzeki Takakeishō, born 1996)
- 2016–2026: 15th and 17th Tokiwayama Takakatsu (iin, komusubi Takamisugi, born 1961)
- 2004–2016: 19th Chiganoura Yasuhito (riji, sekiwake Masudayama, born 1951)

== Coach ==
- Tokiwayama Taichi (iin, komusubi Takamisugi, born 1961)

== Assistant ==
- Ranbō (sewanin, makushita 13, real name Takao Inoue, born 1972)

== Notable active wrestlers ==
- Takanoshō (best rank sekiwake, born 1994)
- Wakanoshō (best rank maegashira, born 2003)
- Takakento (best rank jūryō, born 1996)

== Notable former wrestlers ==
- Takakeishō (ōzeki, born 1996)
- Takanoiwa (maegashira, born 1990)
- Takanofuji (jūryō, born 1997)
- Masunoyama (maegashira 4, born 1990)
- Takagenji (maegashira 10, born 1997)

== Hairdresser ==
- Tokokatsu (first class tokoyama, born 1970)
- Tokosen (third class tokoyama, born 1991)

== Location and access ==
2-1-18 Tatekawa, Sumida, Tokyo
5-minute walk from Morishita Station (Toei Shinjuku Line, Toei Ōedo Line)

== See also ==
- List of sumo stables
- List of active sumo wrestlers
- List of past sumo wrestlers
- Glossary of sumo terms
