= Takakeishō Takanobu =

Japanese sumo wrestler

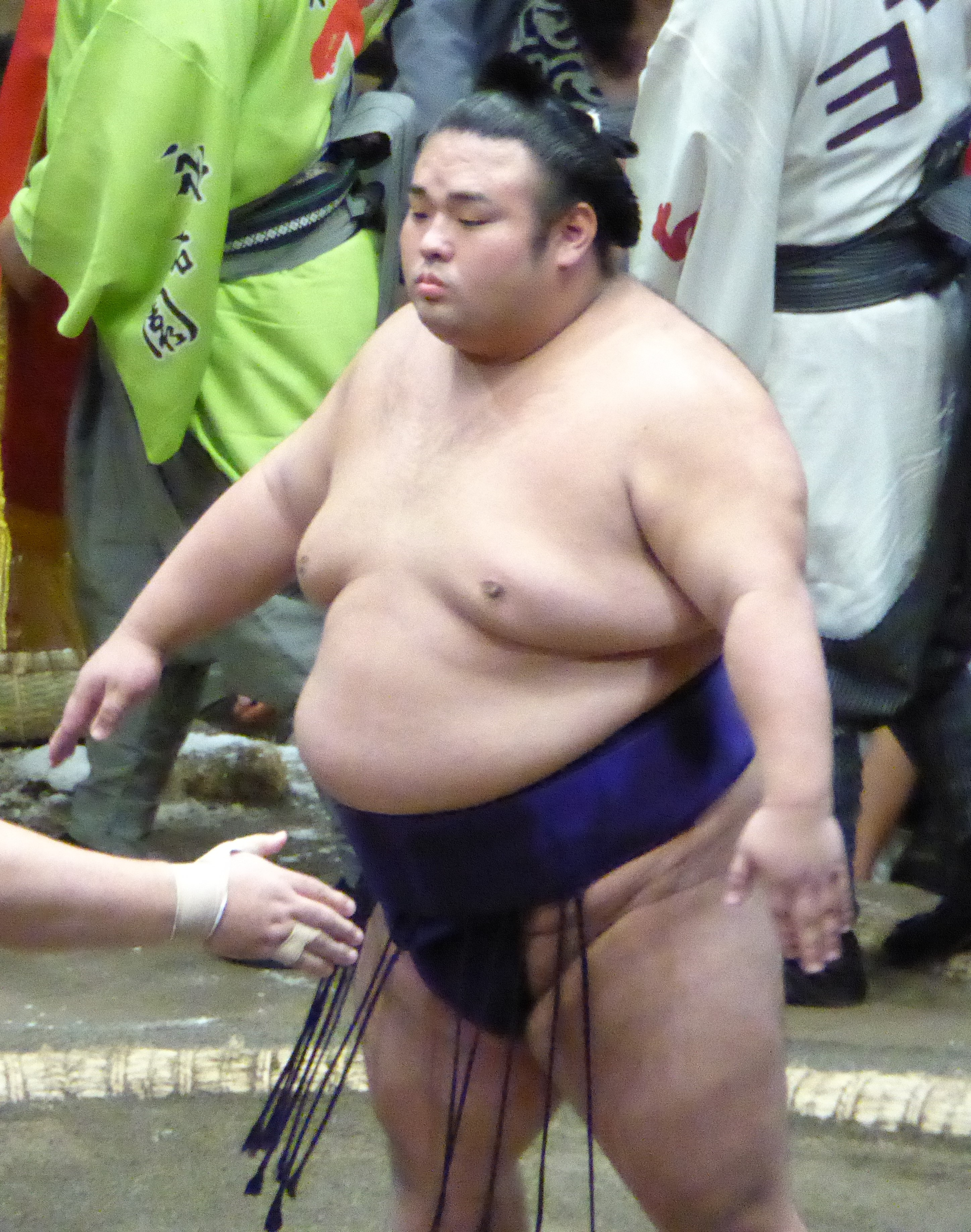
- Takakeishō in 2018

Personal information
- Native name: 貴景勝 貴信
- Born: Takanobu Satō; August 5, 1996 (age 30) Ashiya, Hyōgo, Japan
- Height: 1.75 m (5 ft 9 in)
- Weight: 165 kg (364 lb; 26.0 st)

Sport
- Sport: Sumo
- Retired: September 2024
- Heya: Takanohana → Tokiwayama
- Debut: September 2014
- Highest rank: Ōzeki (May 2019)
- Elder name: Minatogawa
- Championships: 4 (Makuuchi); 1 (Jūryō); 1 (Makushita); 1 (Jonidan); 1 (Jonokuchi)
- Special Prizes: 3 Outstanding Performance; 2 Fighting Spirit; 2 Technique
- Gold Stars: 3 Harumafuji 2 Kisenosato 1
- Updated on 5 June 2025

Takakeishō Takanobu (貴景勝 貴信; born August 5, 1996) (born Takanobu Satō (Japanese: 佐藤 貴信, Hepburn: Satō Takanobu)) is a Japanese former professional sumo wrestler from Ashiya, Hyōgo. He made his professional debut in September 2014, and reached the highest makuuchi division in January 2017 after 14 tournaments. He won his first championship in the top division in November 2018, four years after his debut. Takakeishō wrestled for Tokiwayama stable, and his highest rank was ōzeki, which he first reached in May 2019. He earned seven special prizes and three gold stars for defeating yokozuna. He won his second championship in November 2020, his third one in January 2023, and his fourth one in September 2023. Consecutive losing tournaments in 2024 resulted in his demotion to sekiwake. He withdrew from the September 2024 tournament after a series of losses, and subsequently announced his retirement. He is now a coach under the elder name Minatogawa.

== Early life and sumo experience ==
Satō's given name of Takanobu was derived from the name of yokozuna Takanohana, who would eventually become his stablemaster. Growing up in Ashiya, Hyōgo, Satō competed in full-contact karate in early primary school, and was runner up for the championship in a national competition. However, his father was determined that his son would become a sumo wrestler, and in Satō's third year he began participating sumo at a local dojo. After primary school, he entered Hotoku Gakuen Junior High School, known for its sumo program. In his third year there he won a national championship and took the title of junior high school yokozuna, or grand champion.

Encouraged by his father to eat hamburgers and French fries, his weight increased from 30 kilos in the third grade to 80 kilos by sixth grade. He then moved to eastern Japan and entered the private high school Saitama Sakae, which had an athletics course. During his time at Saitama Sakae, Satō won two successive championships, the Kantō regional high school sumo tournament and the National Junior Sumo Tournament, wrestling in the free weight category. In total Satō won 10 national titles in his high school years. In his third year, he was also champion in the free weight category of the World Junior Sumo Tournament held in Taiwan.

== Career ==
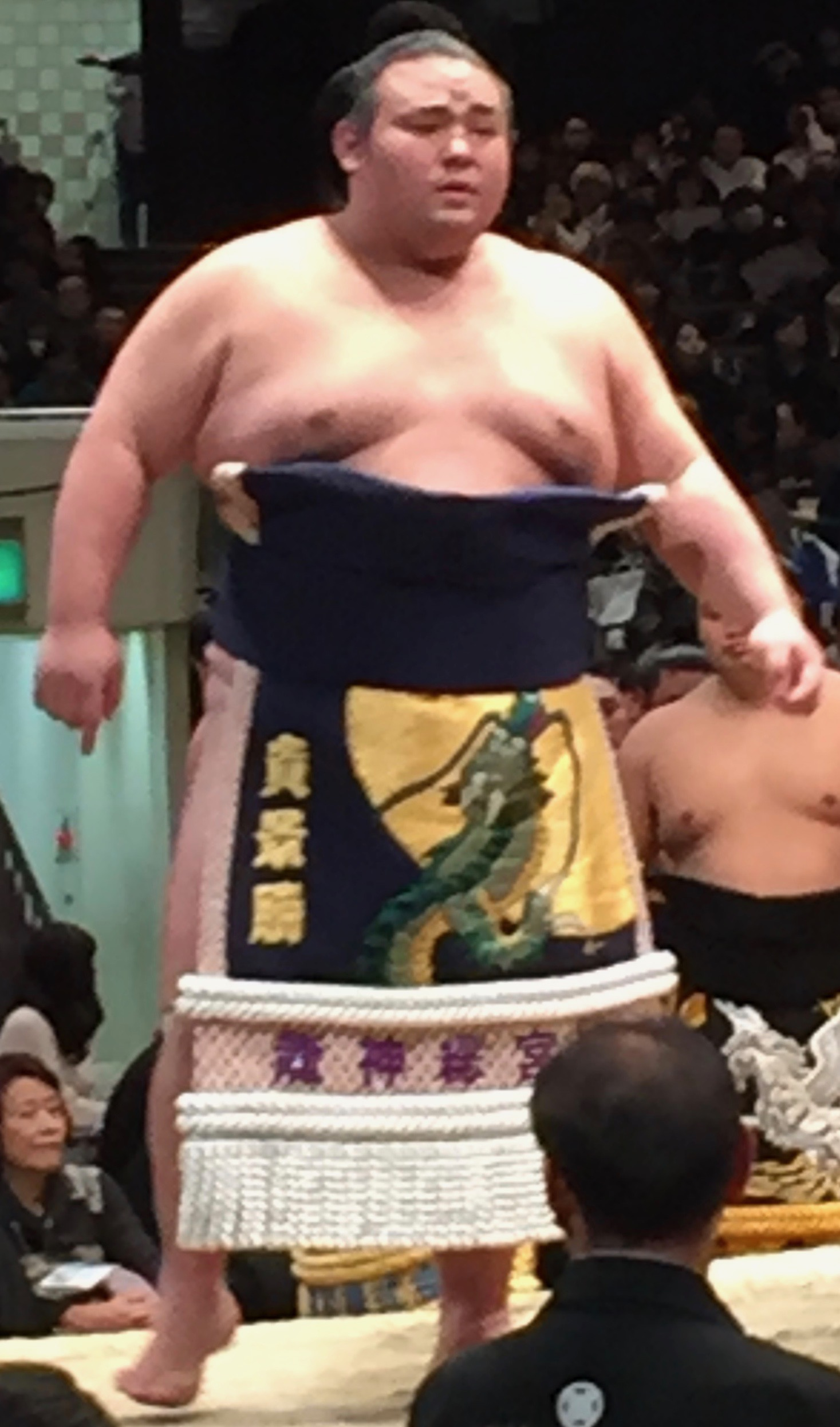
Takakeishō in 2017

Satō was quite eager to join the professional sumo world, so after high school, he decided to forego university in favor of competing in national sumo tournaments (which would have given him a chance to later gain makushita tsukedashi status) and quickly joined Takanohana stable. Though it is common practice for wrestlers to take on a ring name upon entering this particular stable, he chose to use his real name. Because of his strong desire to join the professional ranks as quickly as possible, he participated in maezumo (preliminary sumo tryouts) in September 2014 while still a high school student, a very rare occurrence. His coach, the former yokozuna Takanohana, made an arrangement with Sato's high school that he would continue to attend school when not participating in official tournaments. Later news reports however stated that he had dropped out of high school.

Satō officially entered the sumo ring as a professional rikishi in November 2014, and in his debut won the lowest division, or jonokuchi, championship with a perfect 7–0 record. He added on another championship, again with a perfect 7–0 record in his next tournament in the next highest division jonidan. In the following March tournament in Osaka, competing in the sandanme division, he finally lost his first bout on the third day, ending his successive win record at 15 bouts. In the following May 2015 tournament, in the makushita division, he had a perfect 6–0 record up until his last bout, but he lost this one to the future Takaryū, who took the championship. This happened again two tournaments later, where he chalked up another six wins in his first six bouts, only to lose to veteran Azumaryū. This was still a good enough record to compete in an eight-man playoff. He defeated two opponents to make it to the final round, but then lost the last round for the championship to future sekitori Chiyoshōma. In the following November 2015 tournament after winning three bouts in a row, he lost his next four and got his first make-koshi or losing tournament. He would bounce back two tournaments later, in March of the following year, winning all of his bouts and defeating former sekitori Ōiwato in his final bout to clinch his first makushita championship. This was a decisive championship that would, in the next tournament, propel him into the salaried ranks of jūryō.

In his first jūryō tournament he became only the sixth wrestler in history, and the first ever in his teens to win eight consecutive bouts (a kachi-koshi) in his debut. He however went on to lose four bouts and ended with an 11–4 record for that May 2016 tournament. He spent the next few tournaments rising steadily up the ranks of jūryō recording only one make-koshi, his second up to that point. This culminated in his fourth tournament in jūryō where he chalked up a 12–3 record in the ultra-competitive upper ranks of this division and earned his first championship as a salaried wrestler. In January 2017, he was promoted to the top flight makuuchi division. On this occasion he chose to adopt the ring name Takakeishō Mitsunobu. The first character in his shikona surname comes from the first character in the shikona of his stablemaster, Takanohana, and the second two characters are taken from the given name of the Japanese historical figure, Kagekatsu Uesugi.

In Takakeishō's top division debut he only managed a 7–8 record. However, he followed up with eleven wins against four losses in the March 2017 tournament and was awarded his first special prize, for Fighting Spirit. Another 11–4 record in May saw him promoted to maegashira 1, but he struggled at his new rank and recorded only five wins in July. Ranked at maegashira 5 in September 2017, he earned his first kinboshi or victory over a yokozuna by defeating Harumafuji, who went on to win the tournament. Takakeishō was awarded the Outstanding Performance Prize on the final day. In November he again recorded eleven wins, earning two further kinboshi with victories over Harumafuji and Kisenosato and receiving a second consecutive prize for Outstanding Performance.

In January 2018 Takakeisho made his san'yaku debut at komusubi, the first member of Takanohana stable to reach this rank since his stablemaster established the stable in February 2004. He fell short with a 5–10 record, and withdrew from the following tournament in March with only three wins due to pain in his right ankle. He returned to the komusubi rank in September 2018 and secured a winning record. Shortly after this tournament his stable was dissolved and he moved to Chiganoura stable, now renamed Tokiwayama stable.

=== First tournament championship and ōzeki promotion ===
The 2018 Kyushu tournament in November saw many withdrawals due to injury (kyūjō). Neither yokozuna Hakuhō nor yokozuna Kakuryū competed. Komusubi Kaisei also withdrew from contention with an injury. Takakeishō started the tournament well going undefeated the first six days including wins over yokozuna Kisenosato on Day 1, and ōzeki Gōeidō on Day 2. He suffered his first loss on Day 7 to sekiwake Mitakeumi. He then proceeded to win the next six days including a win over ōzeki Tochinoshin on Day 9, before suffering his second loss to ōzeki Takayasu on Day 14, with the result that both rikishi entered the final day tied with two losses each. Takakeishō won his final bout against Nishikigi, ensuring that he was either assured victory or a playoff with Takayasu if the ōzeki won his final bout. But instead Takakeishō watched as the same wrestler who handed him his first loss, Mitakeumi, guaranteed him his first top division championship by defeating Takayasu in the final bout. With just 26 career tournaments under his belt, this victory tied him with yokozuna Akebono for fourth fastest all time from debut to winning a top division championship. At 22 years of age he was the sixth youngest top division championship winner since the six tournaments per year system began in 1958. The win also meant that Takakeishō has won championships in all but the sandanme division in his career.

Takakeishō followed up with an 11–4 record in January 2019, winning the Technique Prize. This gave him a record of 33 wins over the last three tournaments, but he was not promoted to ōzeki due to a combination of his failure to win more than nine victories in September, and his one-sided loss to ōzeki Gōeidō on the final day. In March he entered the penultimate day with a record of 9–4, including wins over Kakuryū and Takayasu, but was quickly defeated by Ichinojō. On the final day he was matched against Tochinoshin who needed a win to preserve his ōzeki rank. Takakeisho dominated the bout and pushed his opponent out to win by oshi-dashi. Reports in Japan declared it a certainty that he would be promoted to ōzeki, and at a press conference in Higashiōsaka he spoke of his relief at earning promotion after missing out in January. The Sumo Association made the ōzeki promotion official on 27 March 2019, and delivered the news to Takakeishō at a press conference in Osaka. "I will respect the bushidō spirit," he said in his acceptance speech, "and be thoughtful and thankful at all times while devoting myself to the way of the sumo." After his promotion ceremony, Takakeishō thanked his parents Kazuya and Junko Sato for supporting him, and promised to repay them through sumo. He said that reaching the rank of ōzeki is "a childhood dream," but that "there's a higher rank in the banzuke." He made ōzeki in 28 tournaments after his professional debut, which is the sixth fastest rise since the six-tournament a year system was established in 1958. At 22 years and seven months he was also the ninth youngest to be promoted to ōzeki.

=== Ōzeki career ===
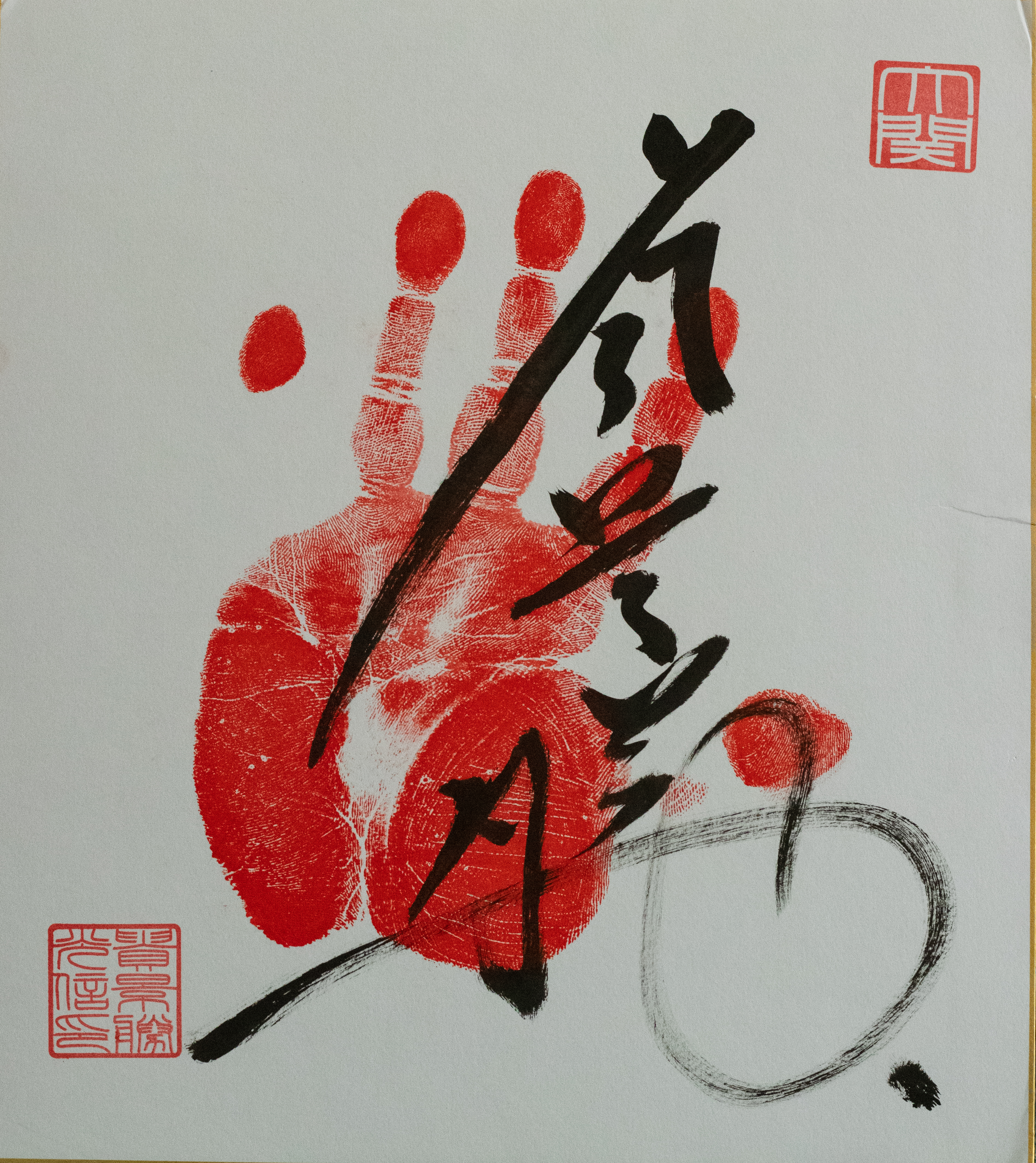
A Takakeisho ōzeki tegata

Takakeishō withdrew on the fifth day of his debut ōzeki tournament in May 2019 due to a right knee injury, only to return to the tournament on Day 8 and fight one more bout before pulling out again the following day after damaging ligaments in the same knee. He became the first ōzeki since 15-day tournaments began in 1949 to withdraw from a tournament twice. On 4 July it was announced that Takakeisho's injury had not fully healed and that he would not compete in that month's upcoming Nagoya tournament, meaning that he would drop back to sekiwake in September. His stablemaster, former Takamisugi Takakatsu commented "He's still young with his future ahead of him. Had he wrestled... there was a big possibility his condition could worsen. If your legs go, you have to give up your sumo career. If his leg heals, he can come back stronger".

On Day 12 of the September tournament, Takakeishō earned his tenth win against Myōgiryū, securing his promotion back to ōzeki for the upcoming November tournament. He entered the final day on 11–3, tied for the lead with Okinoumi and Mitakeumi. He quickly defeated Okinoumi and then entered a play-off against Mitakeumi, whom he had already defeated on day 8. After a strong tachi-ai he retreated and went for a pull-down win but was forced out by his opponent. He suffered a left pectoral muscle strain during the tachi-ai, requiring six weeks of rest. He resumed light training on October 11, and got through the November 2019 Kyushu tournament with a 9–6 record, losing the last match of the tournament to Hakuhō in a bout lasting over a minute. Hakuhō commented that Takakeishō was "just the harbinger of strong young wrestlers yet to come who will represent the sumo world well."

Takakeishō finished the January 2020 basho with a record of 11–4. He entered the final day of the March tournament with a record of 7–7 but lost to Asanoyama. A kadoban ōzeki in the next tournament in July 2020, he secured a winning record of eight wins on Day 11 to retain his rank, but then withdrew from the remainder of the tournament to rest a medial collateral ligament injury in his left leg. He then came back strong in September, finishing as the runner-up to Shōdai with a 12–3 record, his first runner-up performance as an ōzeki.

The November 2020 basho started without both yokozuna and with two ōzeki withdrawing in the first five days, leaving Takakeishō as the only remaining ōzeki in the tournament and the highest ranked in the field. After winning his first eight matches in a row, he faced Terunofuji on the final day, while leading the tournament with a 13–1 record. Although he lost that match, the two faced off again in a playoff, which Takakeishō won to earn his second top division championship, his first as an ōzeki. Takakeishō also had the most wins in 2020 out of any wrestler, with 51.

Takakeishō had been aiming for promotion to yokozuna in the January 2021 tournament, but the opportunity was all but gone after losing his first four matches. After just two wins in nine days, he withdrew on day 10 as a result of an ankle injury. Facing demotion from his rank in the March tournament, he secured a 10–5 winning record, allowing him to stay an ozeki. He was runner-up to Terunofuji in the May tournament with a 12–3 record, defeating Terunofuji in their regulation match on the final day but losing to him in the subsequent playoff.

Takakeishō withdrew from the July 2021 tournament after suffering a neck injury in his Day 2 match against Ichinojō. The injury required one month of recovery time, according to officials. Upon his return in September he lost his first three matches, and would have lost his ōzeki rank had he withdrawn again. He managed an 8–7 record, and performed better in November, finishing runner-up to Terunofuji on 12–3.

Takakeishō pulled out of the January 2022 tournament on the fourth day after he sprained his right ankle in his loss to Ura the day before. It was Takakeishō's eighth career kyūjō, and the March 2022 basho was his fifth tournament in kadoban status. He preserved his ōzeki rank by securing his eighth win on the 11th day of the March tournament against Kotonowaka.

Following a further 8–7 record in the March tournament, Takakeishō achieved three consecutive double-digit winning scores in the July, September and November basho, finishing as joint runner-up to Ichinojō alongside yokozuna Terunofuji and losing a play-off for the November title to Abi in November. On the strength of the latter performance, he was a candidate for yokozuna promotion in the January 2023 basho, requiring a strong yusho to clinch promotion to sumo's highest rank. Although Takakeisho won the tournament - his third in the top makuuchi division - head judge Sadogatake-oyakata indicated that he would not be recommended for promotion given his 12–3 final score. After his victory Takakeishō spoke of the expectations on him as the only ōzeki and top competitor in the absence of Terunofuji but said "I've channeled that pressure into energy and inspiration."

Takakeishō aimed for promotion to yokozuna at the March 2023 tournament in Osaka, which he regards as his home tournament coming from Hyōgo Prefecture, and where he also clinched promotion to jūryō and to ōzeki. Things got off to a bad start when he lost to Tobizaru on the opening day. He then suffered a left knee injury in his Day 3 victory over Shōdai. He reportedly sought medical treatment after the injury, and the next day his left knee was taped up in the dohyō. Entering Day 6 with two losses, he was defeated by Mitakeumi, further aggravating his knee injury. Takakeishō withdrew from the tournament the following day, with his stablemaster Tokiwayama (former sekiwake Takamisugi) saying that he would not return to the basho. Tokiwayama told reporters upon his ōzeki's withdrawal: "His face might not show it, but he's more frustrated than anyone." With Terunofuji having withdrawn prior to the opening day, Takakeishō's departure left the grand sumo tournament with no competing yokozuna or ōzeki for the first time since the start of the Shōwa era in 1926.

Before the May 2023 tournament, Takakeishō changed the first name of his shikona to his legal given name, "Takanobu". He entered the tournament in Tokyo at demotion-threatened kadoban status for the sixth time in his career. Despite being plagued by injuries to both knees and in a battered state, he secured his eighth win and his Ozeki status after defeating Meisei on Day 13 by sidestepping at the tachiai. His former coach from the Saitama Sakae High School Sumo Club commented, "I could feel his mental strength and determination. Under normal circumstances, he wouldn't be able to compete. It's truly amazing that he secured a winning record". He eventually ended up with an 8–7 record for this tournament. Takakeishō however withdrew from the July tournament citing cartilage damage in both his knees, requiring around 3 weeks' treatment. When asked about a potential return from kyūjō during the tournament, his stablemaster Tokiwayama said it was likely he would not do so. This marks the tenth time Takakeishō has forfeited a tournament (partially or fully), and the seventh time he has had to return to competition in a kadoban situation.

At the end of August, it was reported that Takakeishō intended to take part in the September tournament, giving himself a chance to emerge from kadoban status. In his preparation, he faced Ōzeki Kirishima and newly-promoted ōzeki Hōshōryū, winning three times in four matches. On the eleventh day of the September tournament, he recorded an eighth victory over sekiwake Wakamotoharu, thus saving his rank for the seventh time in total. Going into the final day, Takakeishō had a record of ten wins and four losses, one win behind the leader Atamifuji. While Atamifuji lost his final match, Takakeishō beat Daieishō to set up a playoff between himself and Atamifuji, with both finishing on identical 11–4 records. Takakeishō won the playoff by slapping down his opponent shortly after the tachi-ai, clinching his fourth tournament championship. He became the second ōzeki to win a championship having sat out the previous tournament, following Chiyotaikai in 2003.

Takakeishō had a chance to be promoted to yokozuna with the condition of winning a high-level championship in the November tournament. However, his hopes for promotion became slim after he suffered his third loss on Day 8. He concluded the November tournament with a 9–6 score.

After winning two out of three matches at the start of the January 2024 tournament, Takakeishō withdrew from competition citing a pinched nerve. According to his stablemaster Tokiwayama, the neck condition worsened after his Day 2 bout against Atamifuji. He added that Takakeishō himself requested to withdraw from the tournament, and that there were no plans for him to re-enter. It was the eleventh time that Takakeishō withdrew from a sumo tournament. It was also the eighth time Takakeishō would wrestle under kadoban ōzeki status. In preparation for the tournament, Takakeishō's physical condition cast doubt on his participation, as the ōzeki failed to show up for training the very week the tournament began. When questioned, however, his master Tokiwayama declared that Takakeishō intended to take part in the tournament. Although Takakeishō escaped demotion on Day 13 by recording an eighth win over fellow ōzeki Kotonowaka, he withdrew from the tournament the following day as, per a statement from his stablemaster, he injured his right pectoral muscle in the process. Later that same month, he withdrew from regional tours, giving details of his injuries and revealing that he hadn't recovered from his pinched nerve. Takakeishō withdrew from the May 2024 tournament after dropping his opening day match to Hiradoumi, with doctors diagnosing him with a herniated disc.

=== Demotion and retirement ===
Entering kadoban status again for the July 2024 tournament, Takakeishō was unable to secure a winning record, losing his eighth match on Day 13 to then-tournament leader Terunofuji. Takakeishō was demoted to sekiwake for the second time in September, where he needed 10 matches to regain his ōzeki rank. However, he withdrew after suffering consecutive defeats in the first two days, with his medical certificate citing more neck issues.

On 20 September 2024, near the end of that month's tournament, Takakeishō announced his retirement as a competitor. At a press conference held the next day, Takakeishō said that he was "burned out." He said that although his ambition since childhood was to become a yokozuna, his depleted strength and energy made further pursuit of this goal impossible. At the time of his retirement, Takakeishō was the second youngest to retire among wrestlers who reached the ōzeki rank since 1925. He was also the first to retire in one tournament after his demotion from ōzeki since Chiyotaikai in 2010. It was announced that he would take the elder name Minatogawa and stay with the Sumo Association as a coach at Tokiwayama stable.

Takakeishō's retirement ceremony was held on 4 October 2025 at the Ryōgoku Kokugikan. About 300 people took part in the cutting of his topknot, including Tokyo governor Yuriko Koike and former Yokozuna Deliberation Council member and JASRAC chairman Shunichi Tokura.

In November 2025 it was announced that Takakeishō would take over the stable where he trained as an ōzeki ahead of stablemaster Tokiwayama's 65th birthday, which is professional sumo's mandatory retirement age. Following the January 2026 tournament, Tokiwayama stable became Minatogawa stable.

== Fighting style ==
Takakeishō specialized in pushing and thrusting techniques (tsuki/oshi). He regularly won by oshi-dashi (frontal push out) and hataki-komi (slap down). His tendency to avoid yotsu grappling techniques and throws has been attributed by some sumo commentators to his relatively short arms. It was noted however that he expanded his repertoire somewhat during his January 2023 tournament victory, winning two matches by kotenage (armlock throw) and clinching the championship with a sukuinage (beltless arm throw).

== Personal life ==
In August 2020 Takakeishō announced his engagement to fashion model Yukina Chiba. She is the daughter of former ōzeki Hokuten'yū. During the press conference celebrating the achievement of his third tournament, it was revealed that he had a son with his wife. After his sudden retirement, he lost an incredible amount of weight, with his father stating that the weight decrease is not a concern (whilst commenting on his diet and his low appetite).

== Career record ==
Takakeishō Takanobu
Year	January Hatsu basho, Tokyo	March Haru basho, Osaka	May Natsu basho, Tokyo	July Nagoya basho, Nagoya	September Aki basho, Tokyo	November Kyūshū basho, Fukuoka
2014	x	x	x	x	(Maezumo)	West Jonokuchi #18; 7–0; Champion
2015	East Jonidan #10; 7–0; Champion	East Sandanme #18; 5–2	East Makushita #55; 6–1	West Makushita #27; 4–3	West Makushita #21; 6–1–PPP	West Makushita #7; 3–4
2016	West Makushita #13; 4–3	East Makushita #9; 7–0; Champion	East Jūryō #13; 11–4	West Jūryō #6; 6–9	East Jūryō #9; 10–5	West Jūryō #3; 12–3; Champion
2017	East Maegashira #12; 7–8	East Maegashira #13; 11–4; F	West Maegashira #7; 11–4	West Maegashira #1; 5–10	West Maegashira #5; 9–6; O★	West Maegashira #1; 11–4; O★★
2018	East Komusubi #1; 5–10	West Maegashira #3; 3–8–4	West Maegashira #10; 10–5	West Maegashira #3; 10–5	West Komusubi #1; 9–6	East Komusubi #1; 13–2; FO
2019	East Sekiwake #1; 11–4; T	East Sekiwake #1; 10–5; T	East Ōzeki #2; 3–4–8	East Ōzeki #2; Sat out due to injury 0–0–15	West Sekiwake #1; 12–3–P	East Ōzeki #2; 9–6
2020	East Ōzeki #1; 11–4	East Ōzeki #1; 7–8	East Ōzeki #1; Tournament Cancelled; State of Emergency; 0–0–0	East Ōzeki #1; 8–4–3	West Ōzeki #1; 12–3	East Ōzeki #1; 13–2–P
2021	East Ōzeki #1; 2–8–5	East Ōzeki #2; 10–5	West Ōzeki #1; 12–3–P	West Ōzeki #1; 1–2–12	West Ōzeki #1; 8–7	West Ōzeki #1; 12–3
2022	East Ōzeki #1; 1–3–11	West Ōzeki #2; 8–7	West Ōzeki #2; 8–7	East Ōzeki #1; 11–4	East Ōzeki #1; 10–5	East Ōzeki #1; 12–3–P
2023	West Ōzeki #1; 12–3	West Ōzeki #1; 3–4–8	West Ōzeki #1; 8–7	East Ōzeki #1; Sat out due to injury 0–0–15	West Ōzeki #1; 11–4–P	East Ōzeki #1; 9–6
2024	West Ōzeki #2; 2–2–11	East Ōzeki #2; 8–6–1	East Ōzeki #2; 0–2–13	West Ōzeki #2; 5–10	West Sekiwake #2; Retired; 0–3–10	x
Record given as wins–losses–absences Top division champion Top division runner-up Retired Lower divisions Non-participation Sanshō key: F=Fighting spirit; O=Outstanding performance; T=Technique Also shown: ★=Kinboshi; P=Playoff(s); Divisions: Makuuchi — Jūryō — Makushita — Sandanme — Jonidan — Jonokuchi Makuuchi ranks: Yokozuna — Ōzeki — Sekiwake — Komusubi — Maegashira

== See also ==
- Glossary of sumo terms
- List of ōzeki
- List of past sumo wrestlers
- List of sumo tournament second division champions
- List of sumo tournament top division champions
- List of sumo tournament top division runners-up
