= Takagenji Satoshi =

Japanese sumo wrestler

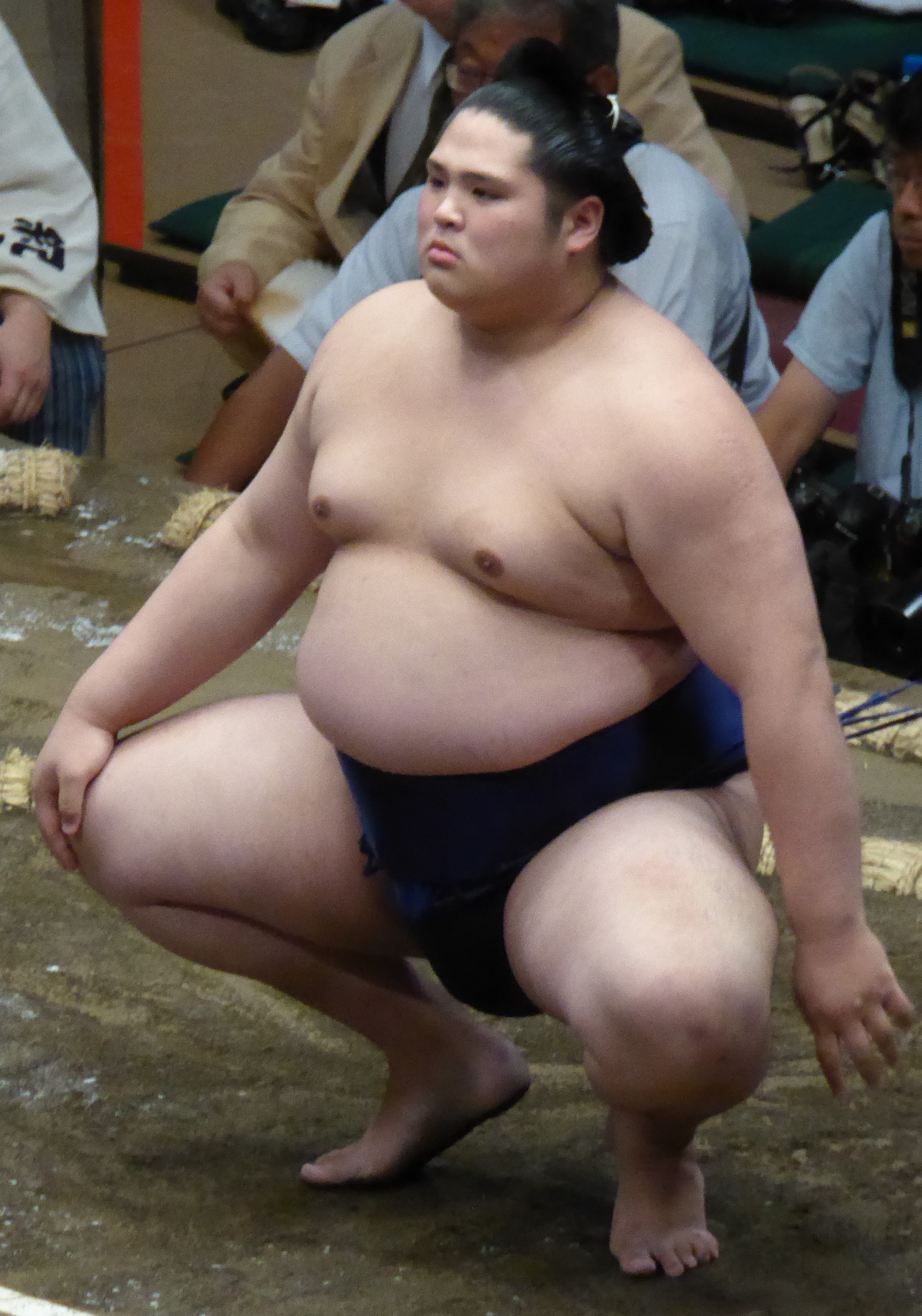
- Takagenji in 2018

Personal information
- Native name: 貴源治 賢士
- Born: Satoshi Kamiyama; May 13, 1997 (age 29) Sakai, Ibaraki, Japan
- Height: 1.91 m (6 ft 3 in)
- Weight: 168 kg (370 lb)

Sport
- Sport: Sumo
- Retired: July, 2021
- Heya: Takanohana → Tokiwayama
- Record: 271–248
- Debut: March, 2013
- Highest rank: Maegashira 10 (July, 2019)
- Championships: 1 (Jūryō)
- Updated on July 30, 2021

Takagenji Satoshi (Japanese: 貴源治 賢士; born May 13, 1997 as Satoshi Kamiyama (上山 賢)) is a Japanese mixed martial artist and former professional sumo wrestler from Ibaraki Prefecture. He made his debut in March 2013 and reached the top makuuchi division in July 2019. He wrestled for the Takanohana and Tokiwayama stables. His highest rank was maegashira 10. He has a twin brother Takanofuji Sanzō who debuted alongside him but was dismissed from sumo in 2019. In July 2021 Takagenji himself was dismissed by the Japan Sumo Association for cannabis use.

== Early life and sumo experience ==
He was born in Oyama, Tochigi Prefecture, as a younger brother of an identical twin to a Filipino mother and a Japanese father. He would grow up in Sakai, Ibaraki Prefecture. He was in many sports as a youth such as karate and kickboxing but was particularly good at basketball. In junior high he was ranked third nationally in basketball and was scouted by many top high school basketball programs. Among his rivals was future NBA player Rui Hachimura. Upon his father's request he took up sumo after being introduced to yokozuna Takanohana in the third grade. After junior high he chose to join Takanohana stable along with his brother stating, "I won't make any money in basketball and I would like to continue using my body." The stable already had a set of twins (Takageppo and Takatoshi) making Takanohana stable the first in sumo history to have two sets of twins simultaneously. However, both of the other twins had retired by the end of 2014.

== Sumo career ==
Takagenji made his professional debut alongside his brother in March 2013. He steadily rose up the ranks before hitting his first wall upon his promotion to makushita two years later in March 2015. He could manage only three wins at the rank and was immediately demoted back down to sandanme. He proceeded to bounce between the two divisions for a little less than a year before a surprise 6–1 runner-up performance in January 2016 would help to firmly establish him in the makushita division. He fought in this division for a little over a year before on the coattails five kachi-koshi or winning records he achieved 4–3 record at makushita 1 and gained promotion to the jūryō division. His first tournament in jūryō did not pan out as his last year had and he fell flat managing only a 4–11 record and being immediately be demoted back down to the makushita division. This wouldn't last long though as two winning records would send him back up to the sekitori ranks. This time his stay in jūryō was the polar opposite of his first with four straight winning records before getting his first make-koshi or losing record. After the January 2018 tournament, his brother (then known as Takayoshitoshi) was promoted to jūryō also, making them the first twins to be ranked in jūryō simultaneously. Shortly after this his stable was dissolved and he moved to then Chiganoura stable (since renamed) along with his brother. In May 2019 at the rank of jūryō 2 he got a 13–2 winning record taking home the yūshō or championship and guaranteeing his promotion to the top division.

Takagenji made his makuuchi debut in July 2019 at the rank of maegashira 10. He made a promising start by winning four of his first five matches but then lost ten in a row to finish on 4–11. The same score of 4–11 in the September tournament from the very bottom rank of maegashira 17 saw him demoted to jūryō for November 2019. Further losing records saw him demoted to makushita for the September 2020 tournament, but he returned to jūryō after just one tournament.

== Disciplinary record and dismissal ==
In September 2019 when his twin brother was told to retire for striking his tsukebito or personal assistant, Takagenji was also reprimanded because although he had not used physical violence, he was found to have engaged in power harassment.

In December 2019, the Japan Sumo Association admitted that Takagenji participated in a regional sumo tour in Kyushu while infected with the influenza virus. A spokesperson said that Takagenji reported his health condition to a hospital in Saga on 11 December, but then climbed into the dohyō later in the day. The actions were criticized by the head of the Japan Sports Agency, and the Sumo Association acknowledged that it failed to handle the matter properly.

The Sumo Association announced in July 2021 that Takagenji had failed a test for cannabis. Having initially claimed that a trace must have come from the oil of a pain reliever he was using, he later admitted that he had smoked a cannabis cigarette while roadside at his Nagoya training quarters. Takagenji was told to stay home by his stablemaster while the Sumo Association's compliance committee investigated. Takagenji is also under investigation by the Tokyo Metropolitan Police Department. On July 30, 2021 it was announced by the Sumo Association that Takagenji would retire immediately, and that his stablemaster would be demoted. The compliance committee noted that Takagenji had been warned about his future conduct less than two years ago, had lied about his cannabis use until the positive drug test confirmed it, and had smoked cannabis on at least eight occasions.

On the September 2021 banzuke the position of Jūryō 9 West, which Takagenji would have occupied, was left blank. On 3 September 2021 his case was referred to prosecutors regarding possible violation of the Cannabis Control Law by possessing marijuana, but it was announced on 12 October that he would not be prosecuted.

== Sumo fighting style ==
Takagenji was an oshi-sumo specialist who favoured pushing techniques to fighting on the mawashi or belt. His most common kimarite was yorikiri followed by oshidashi and tsukidashi. He was initially a yotsu-sumo or grappling specialist, but began to switch to pushing techniques around 2015 to try to improve his performances after finding himself going back and forth between the makushita and sandanme divisions. His consistency improved and he was eventually promoted to sekitori level in 2017.

He was known for being a diligent trainer, so much so that when he dislocated his knee while practicing on tour in Tokushima in October 2016, he re-inserted the dislocated knee joint so he could finish the training session.

== Mixed martial arts career ==
On December 24, 2021, Satoshi announced that he was becoming a mixed martial artist, adopting the ring name Takakenshin (貴賢神). His first bout against Hideki "Shrek" Sekine was scheduled for April 16, 2022 at Rizin Trigger 3. He lost the bout via TKO due to soccer kicks and punches on the ground in the second round.

Satoshi faced Cally Gibrainn de Oliveira at Rizin Landmark 4 on November 6, 2022. He lost the fight by ground and pound TKO stoppage at the end of the first round.

Satoshi faced Hidetaka Arato at Rizin Landmark 6 on October 1, 2023. He lost the bout via technical knockout at the end of the second round.

Satoshi faced Cody Jerabek at RIZIN Landmark 9 on March 23, 2024, winning his first bout via TKO stoppage in the first round.

Posting a record of 4 wins and 4 losses in eight fights, his professional status, however, remained that of a part-time fighter. Several rumors regarding his ties to organized crime are believed to be the reason behind Rizin's decision not to capitalize further on the wrestler. In June 2026, he announced his retirement following a victory over Ryo Sakai and has been critical of the organization ever since his departure. In late October 2026, it was revealed that he had been arrested by police for assaulting a man in the city of Fukui during an altercation on July 24, inflicting serious injuries that required three months of recovery. The leader of a Yamaguchi-gumi faction, who was also arrested, is accused of helping Takagenji hide from law enforcement.

== Sumo career record ==
Takagenji Satoshi
Year	January Hatsu basho, Tokyo	March Haru basho, Osaka	May Natsu basho, Tokyo	July Nagoya basho, Nagoya	September Aki basho, Tokyo	November Kyūshū basho, Fukuoka
2013	x	(Maezumō)	West Jonokuchi #14; 6–1	West Jonidan #29; 2–5	East Jonidan #64; 4–3	East Jonidan #41; 4–3
2014	East Jonidan #19; 5–2	East Sandanme #83; 4–3	West Sandanme #65; 3–4	West Sandanme #78; 6–1	East Sandanme #21; 4–3	East Sandanme #10; 3–4
2015	West Sandanme #23; 5–2	West Makushita #58; 3–4	West Sandanme #11; 6–1	East Makushita #35; 2–5	West Makushita #50; 2–5	West Sandanme #11; 4–3
2016	West Makushita #60; 6–1–P	West Makushita #28; 3–4	West Makushita #36; 5–2	West Makushita #25; 4–3	East Makushita #20; 6–1	East Makushita #7; 5–2
2017	West Makushita #4; 5–2	West Makushita #1; 4–3	West Jūryō #14; 4–11	West Makushita #5; 5–2	East Makushita #1; 4–3	East Jūryō #14; 8–7
2018	West Jūryō #11; 8–7	East Jūryō #10; 8–7	West Jūryō #8; 10–5	West Jūryō #2; 6–9	West Jūryō #5; 8–7	East Jūryō #4; 8–7
2019	East Jūryō #2; 6–9	East Jūryō #4; 8–7	East Jūryō #2; 13–2; Champion	West Maegashira #10; 4–11	East Maegashira #17; 4–11	East Jūryō #6; 5–10
2020	West Jūryō #10; 7–8	West Jūryō #10; 6–9	East Jūryō #13; Tournament Cancelled; 0–0–0	East Jūryō #13; 6–9	East Makushita #1; 4–3	East Jūryō #12; 7–8
2021	West Jūryō #12; 8–7	East Jūryō #10; 10–5	West Jūryō #5; 7–8	East Jūryō #6; 6–9	Dismissed	x
Record given as wins–losses–absences Top division champion Top division runner-up Retired Non-participation Jūryō Lower divisions Sanshō key: F=Fighting spirit; O=Outstanding performance; T=Technique Also shown: ★=Kinboshi; P=Playoff(s); Divisions: Makuuchi — Jūryō — Makushita — Sandanme — Jonidan — Jonokuchi Makuuchi ranks: Yokozuna — Ōzeki — Sekiwake — Komusubi — Maegashira

== Mixed martial arts record ==
Professional record breakdown
8 matches	4 wins	4 losses
By knockout	4	4

Res.	Record	Opponent	Method	Event	Date	Round	Time	Location	Notes
Win	4–4	Ryo Sakai	KO (punches)	Rizin Landmark 14	June 6, 2026	1	1:16	Sendai, Japan	Catchweight (267.2 lb) bout; Kamiyama missed weight.
Win	3–4	Max Yoshida	TKO (punches and elbows)	Rizin Landmark 12	November 3, 2025	1	1:10	Kobe, Japan	
Win	2–4	Masashi Inada	TKO (punches and elbows)	Super Rizin 4	July 27, 2025	2	2:29	Saitama, Japan	
Loss	1–4	King Edokpolo	KO (knee and punches)	Rizin 49	December 31, 2024	1	3:22	Saitama, Japan	
Win	1–3	Cody Jerabek	TKO (punches)	Rizin Landmark 9	March 23, 2024	1	2:58	Kobe, Japan	
Loss	0–3	Hidetaka Arato	TKO (punches)	Rizin Landmark 6	October 1, 2023	2	4:49	Nagoya, Japan	
Loss	0–2	Callyugibrainn Marinho Borges	TKO (punches)	Rizin Landmark 4	November 6, 2022	1	4:35	Nagoya, Japan	
Loss	0–1	Hideki Sekine	TKO (soccer kicks and punches)	Rizin Trigger 3	April 16, 2022	2	3:49	Chōfu, Japan	Heavyweight debut.

== See also ==
- List of past sumo wrestlers
- List of sumo tournament second division champions
- Glossary of sumo terms
