= Takanohana Kenshi =

Japanese sumo wrestler

Personal information
- Native name: 貴ノ花 健士
- Born: Mitsuru Hanada; February 19, 1950 Muroran, Hokkaido, Japan
- Died: May 30, 2005 (aged 55)
- Height: 1.82 m (5 ft 11 1/2 in)
- Weight: 115 kg (254 lb; 18.1 st)

Sport
- Sport: Sumo
- Retired: January, 1981
- Heya: Futagoyama
- Record: 726-490-58
- Debut: May, 1965
- Highest rank: Ōzeki (November, 1972)
- Elder name: Futagoyama
- Championships: 2 (Makuuchi); 2 (Jūryō); 1 (Jonokuchi)
- Special Prizes: Outstanding Performance (3); Fighting Spirit (2); Technique (4)
- Gold Stars: 1 (Kitanofuji)
- Updated on June 2020

Takanohana Kenshi (貴ノ花 健士), born Mitsuru Hanada (花田 満, Hanada Mitsuru; February 19, 1950 – May 30, 2005), was a Japanese professional sumo wrestler from Hirosaki, Aomori. Making his debut in May 1965, his highest rank was ōzeki, which he reached in November 1972. He then went on to hold the rank for what was then a record fifty tournaments, before retiring in January 1981. He was extremely popular and was nicknamed the "Prince of Sumo" (角界のプリンス, Kakukai no Purinsu) due to his good looks and relatively slim build. He was the younger brother of Wakanohana Kanji I, and the father of Wakanohana Masaru and Takanohana Kōji. After retiring from competition, he coached both of his sons to the rank of yokozuna as head of Futagoyama stable.

== Early life ==
Takanohana was born in Muroran, Hokkaido, Japan as the youngest of ten children. He was a champion swimmer in middle school, but did not think he could make a living out of it. He was determined to join professional sumo, in spite of some opposition from his family, who had wanted him to continue swimming. He was considered a possible candidate for the Olympic team of the 1968 Summer Olympics in Mexico City.

== Career ==
He began his sumo career in the spring of 1965, joining Futagoyama stable which had been set up his elder brother, former yokozuna Wakanohana Kanji I, three years previously. Reportedly, when he joined, Wakanohana had told him that they were no longer brothers and gave him harsh training, but Takanohana never complained. Debuting under his own surname of Hanada, he would win out in a five-way playoff to secure the sixth division championship.

He reached the top makuuchi division in November 1968 at the age of just 18, the youngest ever at the time (the record is now held by his son Takanohana Kōji). He weighed barely 100 kg, and would remain one of the lightest men in the top division for the rest of his career. He adopted the shikona of Takanohana in 1969. He was the last man to beat yokozuna Taihō, in May 1971. As he rose up the rankings he collected nine special prizes, including four prestigious ginō-shō, or Technique Awards.

After finishing as runner-up in consecutive tournaments in May and July 1972 he reached sumo's second highest rank of ōzeki in November 1972. He was promoted at the same time as his friend and rival Wajima, who quickly went on to be promoted to yokozuna. Takanohana's progress was slower, but he did win two top division tournament (or honbasho) championships in March and September 1975, each time delighting the crowds by defeating the giant yokozuna Kitanoumi in a playoff. He and Wakanohana were the first brothers ever to each win a top division tournament title. He was also runner-up in the January and March 1977 tournaments. However he was ultimately unable to defeat Kitanoumi or Wajima on a regular basis, and was hampered by his inability to put on weight, and so never made the yokozuna rank. Nevertheless, he was an ōzeki for fifty tournaments, corresponding to over eight years in the rank. This was a record until July 2007 when it was broken by Chiyotaikai. He was a bigger crowd attraction than some yokozuna.

By the early 1980s he was finding it harder to hold onto his rank, and had been overtaken by his stablemate Wakanohana Kanji II, and other younger wrestlers. One of his final bouts was a memorable clash in September 1980 with Hawaiian born Takamiyama, who was nearly twice his weight and like Takanohana, extremely popular with the Japanese public. Takanohana looked to have won the match with an underarm throw, only for the judges to reverse the referee's decision and rule that the tip of Takanohana's topknot or ōichōmage had brushed the surface of the dohyō ahead of his opponent.

After losing to the rising star Chiyonofuji twice in a row in September and November 1980, he decided the time was right to retire. The two were often compared, and Takanohana had been something of a mentor to Chiyonofuji, advising him to give up smoking to help increase his weight, something that Takanohana himself had never been able to manage. When he retired from sumo in January 1981, Takanohana had been ranked at ōzeki for what was then a record fifty tournaments.

== After retirement ==
After retiring, Takanohana took the name Fujishima and established the Fujishima stable in 1982, which grew to be one of the most powerful in terms of top makuuchi ranked wrestlers. When his elder brother retired as a stablemaster in 1993 he purchased the Futagoyama toshiyori-kabu or elder stock, with the help of 300 million yen from his koenkai, or network of supporters. The two stables merged, and the newly renamed "Futagoyama stable" had one quarter of all the top ranked rikishi in it at one point, including two yokozuna, an ōzeki and many others regularly in the junior san'yaku ranks. During this time it was undoubtedly the most powerful stable the sumo world has seen in the postwar period. He oversaw the promotion of both of his sons to yokozuna, the first time ever that two siblings have held sumo's highest rank.

He was married in 1970 to a former actress and beauty queen, Fujita Noriko, who was once "Miss Ōita Prefecture". They were divorced in 2001.

His health began to decline in 2003, and he withdrew from his duties in the Sumo Association. He passed on control of Futagoyama stable to his son Takanohana in January 2004, and made his last public appearance in January 2005 at the retirement ceremony of one of his former wrestlers, Takanonami.

== Death ==
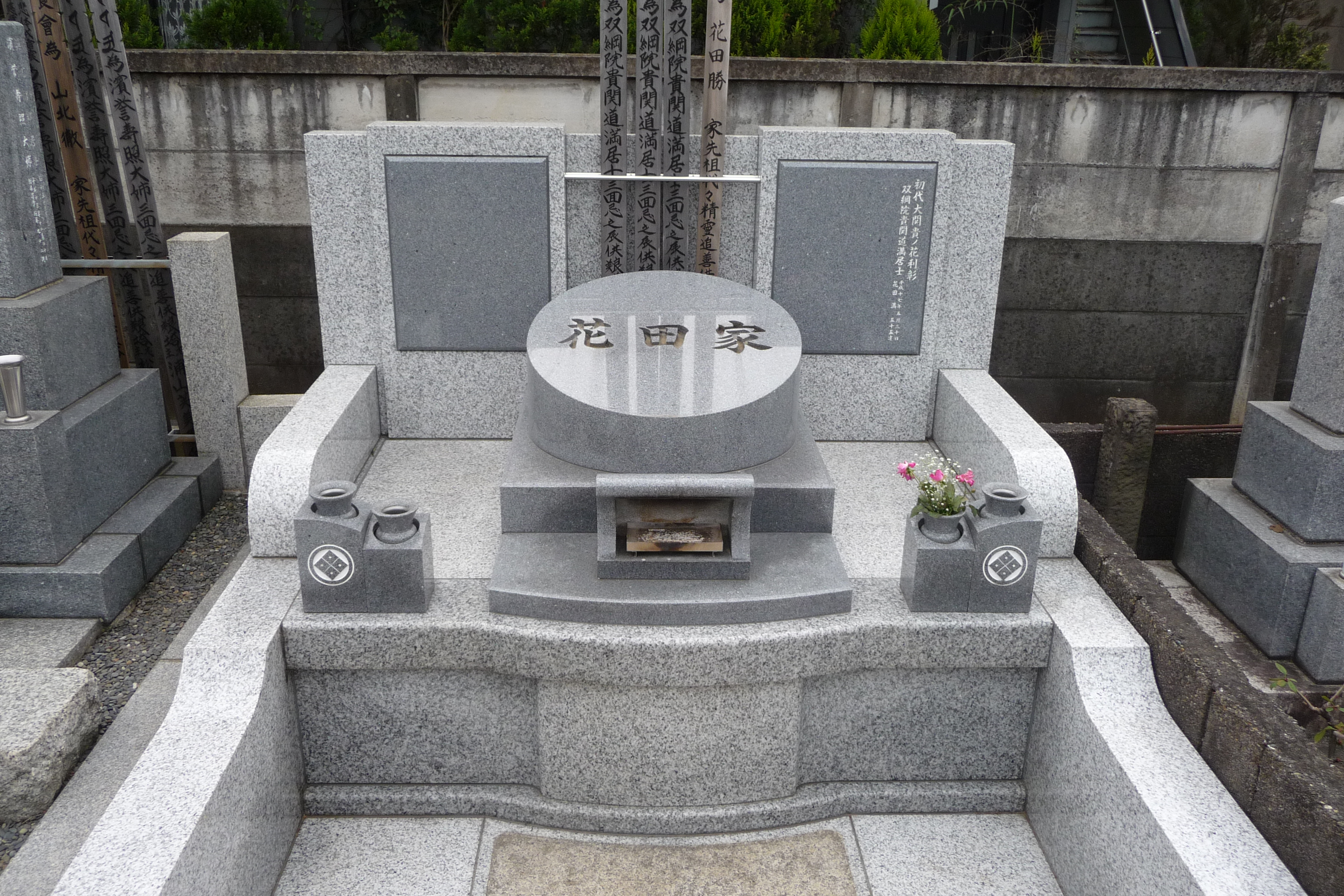
Takanohana's grave in Suginami, Tokyo

In February 2005, his son publicly announced that his father was struggling with mouth cancer (he had been a heavy smoker of Mild Seven cigarettes for most of his life). He underwent extensive treatment, but no recovery was possible, and on 30 May 2005, he succumbed to the disease at the age of 55. There was an acrimonious battle between Takanohana's sons over who should be head mourner at his funeral. More than 1200 attended the event, which was held in Aoyama, Minato, Tokyo. The Sumo Association also held a public funeral in the Ryōgoku Kokugikan on June 13. This was the first time in nine years that a former wrestler had been afforded this honour.

== Fighting style ==
Takanohana's favoured techniques were hidari-yotsu (a right hand outside, left hand inside grip on his opponent's mawashi), tsuridashi (frontal lift out) and uwatenage (overarm throw). He was also noted for his ability to spin at the edge of the ring and turn the tables on his opponent with the utchari throw.

== Career record ==
Takanohana Kenshi
Year	January Hatsu basho, Tokyo	March Haru basho, Osaka	May Natsu basho, Tokyo	July Nagoya basho, Nagoya	September Aki basho, Tokyo	November Kyūshū basho, Fukuoka
1965	x	x	(Maezumo)	West Jonokuchi #15; 6–1–PPP; Champion	West Jonidan #85; 6–1	West Jonidan #13; 5–2
1966	East Sandanme #74; 5–2	East Sandanme #47; 4–3	East Sandanme #37; 4–3	West Sandanme #17; 6–1	West Makushita #73; 5–2	West Makushita #52; 5–2
1967	East Makushita #38; 4–3	East Makushita #31; 4–3	West Makushita #30; 4–3	East Makushita #22; 5–2	West Makushita #13; 6–1	East Makushita #4; 4–3
1968	East Makushita #2; 5–2	East Jūryō #12; 8–7	East Jūryō #10; 7–8	East Jūryō #12; 8–7	West Jūryō #8; 11–4; Champion	East Maegashira #13; 8–7
1969	West Maegashira #11; 7–8	East Maegashira #12; 0–8–7	East Jūryō #11; 9–6	West Jūryō #5; 9–6	West Jūryō #1; 7–8	West Jūryō #2; 11–4; Champion
1970	West Maegashira #9; 10–5	East Maegashira #2; 3–12	West Maegashira #11; 8–7	East Maegashira #7; 11–4	West Komusubi #1; 9–6; O	West Sekiwake #1; 7–8
1971	East Komusubi #1; 2–4–9	East Maegashira #5; 9–6; T	West Komusubi #1; 8–7; O	East Komusubi #1; 8–7; O	West Sekiwake #1; 9–6; T	East Sekiwake #1; 8–7
1972	West Sekiwake #1; 6–9	West Maegashira #1; 10–5 ★	East Komusubi #1; 11–4; T	West Sekiwake #1; 12–3; TF	East Sekiwake #1; 10–5; F	West Ōzeki #1; 9–6
1973	West Ōzeki #3; 8–7	East Ōzeki #2; 0–3–12	West Ōzeki #2; 8–7	West Ōzeki #2; 8–7	East Ōzeki #2; 9–6	West Ōzeki #1; 9–6
1974	East Ōzeki #1; 9–6	West Ōzeki #1; 10–5	West Ōzeki #1; 2–4–9	West Ōzeki #2; 10–5	East Ōzeki #1; 8–7	East Ōzeki #1; 11–4
1975	East Ōzeki #1; 10–5	East Ōzeki #1; 13–2–P	East Ōzeki #1; 9–6	West Ōzeki #1; 0–4–11	West Ōzeki #1; 12–3–P	East Ōzeki #1; 8–7
1976	West Ōzeki #1; 9–6	East Ōzeki #1; 9–6	West Ōzeki #1; 10–5	East Ōzeki #1; 9–6	East Ōzeki #1; 10–5	East Ōzeki #1; 9–6
1977	West Ōzeki #1; 12–3	East Ōzeki #1; 13–2	East Ōzeki #1; 10–5	West Ōzeki #1; 8–7	East Ōzeki #2; 10–5	East Ōzeki #2; 10–5
1978	West Ōzeki #1; 0–5–10	West Ōzeki #2; 8–7	West Ōzeki #2; 8–7	West Ōzeki #2; 8–7	West Ōzeki #2; 8–7	West Ōzeki #1; 10–5
1979	West Ōzeki #1; 9–6	West Ōzeki #1; 9–6	West Ōzeki #1; 9–6	West Ōzeki #1; 9–6	East Ōzeki #1; 10–5	East Ōzeki #1; 9–6
1980	East Ōzeki #1; 7–8	West Ōzeki #1; 10–5	East Ōzeki #1; 8–7	East Ōzeki #1; 9–6	East Ōzeki #1; 9–6	East Ōzeki #1; 8–7
1981	East Ōzeki #1; Retired; 2–5	x	x	x	x	x
Record given as wins–losses–absences Top division champion Top division runner-up Retired Lower divisions Non-participation Sanshō key: F=Fighting spirit; O=Outstanding performance; T=Technique Also shown: ★=Kinboshi; P=Playoff(s); Divisions: Makuuchi — Jūryō — Makushita — Sandanme — Jonidan — Jonokuchi Makuuchi ranks: Yokozuna — Ōzeki — Sekiwake — Komusubi — Maegashira

== See also ==
- Glossary of sumo terms
- List of past sumo wrestlers
- List of sumo tournament top division champions
- List of sumo tournament second division champions
- List of ōzeki
