= Wakanohana Masaru =

Japanese sumo wrestler (born 1971)

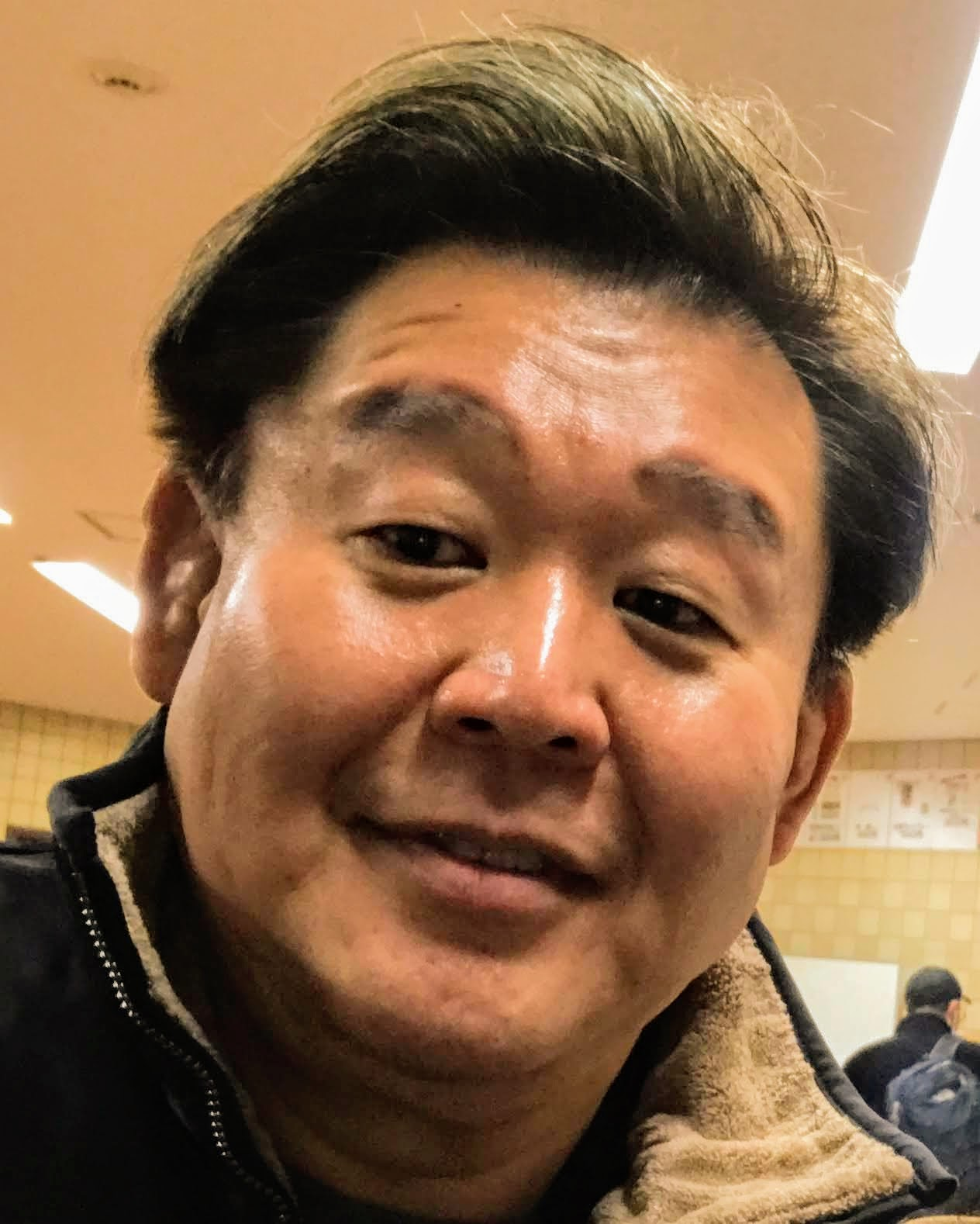
- Wakanohana, January 2020

Personal information
- Native name: 若乃花 勝
- Born: Masaru Hanada; January 20, 1971 (age 55) Suginami, Tokyo, Japan
- Height: 1.80 m (5 ft 11 in)
- Weight: 134 kg (295 lb; 21.1 st)

Sport
- Sport: Sumo
- Retired: March, 2000
- Heya: Futagoyama
- Record: 573-286-133
- Debut: March, 1988
- Highest rank: Yokozuna (May, 1998)
- Elder name: See after sumo
- Championships: 5 (Makuuchi); 1 (Jūryō); 1 (Sandanme); 1 (Jonokuchi)
- Special Prizes: Outstanding Performance (3); Technique (6)
- Gold Stars: 2 (Asahifuji)
- Updated on June 2020

Masaru Hanada (Japanese: 花田 虎上; previously 花田 勝, born January 20, 1971) is a Japanese former professional sumo wrestler. As an active wrestler he was known as Wakanohana Masaru (若乃花 勝), and his rise through the ranks alongside his younger brother Takanohana Kōji saw a boom in sumo's popularity in the early 1990s. He is the elder son of the former ōzeki Takanohana Kenshi, who was also his stablemaster, and the nephew of Wakanohana Kanji I, a famous yokozuna of the 1950s. Wakanohana was a long serving ōzeki who won five tournament championships, and eventually joined his brother as the 66th yokozuna in 1998, creating the first ever sibling grand champions. After a brief and injury plagued yokozuna career he retired in 2000, becoming a television personality and restaurant owner. The death of his father in 2005 saw a very public falling out with his brother.

== Sumo career ==
=== Early career ===
He entered sumo in March 1988, at the same time as his younger brother Takanohana, and joined his father's training stable, then known as Fujishima stable. The two brothers moved out of the family quarters and joined all the other new recruits in the communal area, and were instructed to refer to their father as oyakata (coach) only. Future rivals Akebono and Kaiō made their professional debuts in the same month. In the early part of his career he wrestled under the name Wakahanada (若花田), being given his uncle's fighting name a few tournaments prior to his promotion to ōzeki. Wakanohana means young flower in Japanese.

He entered the top division for the first time in September 1990, alongside Akebono and Takatōriki. He first reached a san'yaku rank in November 1991 when he was promoted to komusubi. In January 1992 he defeated Asahifuji in what was to be the yokozuna's last ever bout, to earn the second of his two kinboshi or gold stars. Lacking his brother's weight and strength, he took longer to rise up the ranks, still being a maegashira wrestler as late as January 1993, the tournament that Takanohana earned promotion to ōzeki. However in the following tournament Wakanohana won his first top division championship or yūshō with a 14–1 record. After a 10–5 in May 1993 and runner-up honours in July, he joined his brother at ōzeki, the first time that two brothers had held the rank simultaneously. His second tournament title came in November 1995, when he defeated Takanohana (by then a yokozuna) in a playoff. This was to be the only time he fought his brother in a competitive match. Wakanohana was injured in the next tournament however, and the same thing happened after his third championship in January 1997. On that occasion he missed two tournaments and only just preserved his ōzeki status with a bare majority of wins upon his return in July 1997. He was a tournament runner-up on five occasions at ōzeki, four of those coming in 1996. Due to the dominance of Futagoyama stable (which Fujishima stable was absorbed into in 1993), he was excused from having to fight several top wrestlers including Takanonami, Takatōriki and Akinoshima.

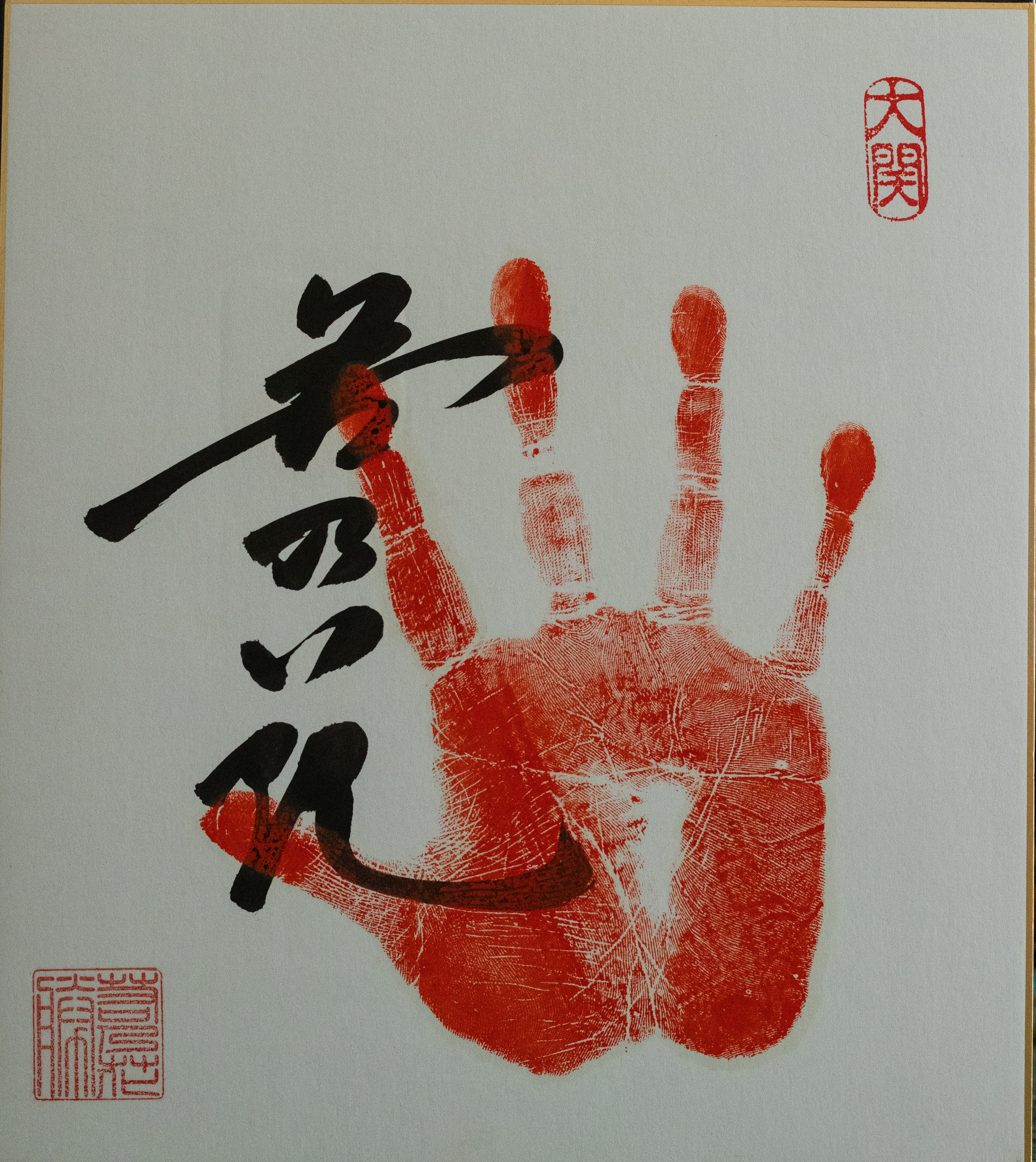
Wakanohana III original Ozeki tegata (handprint & signature)

=== Yokozuna ===
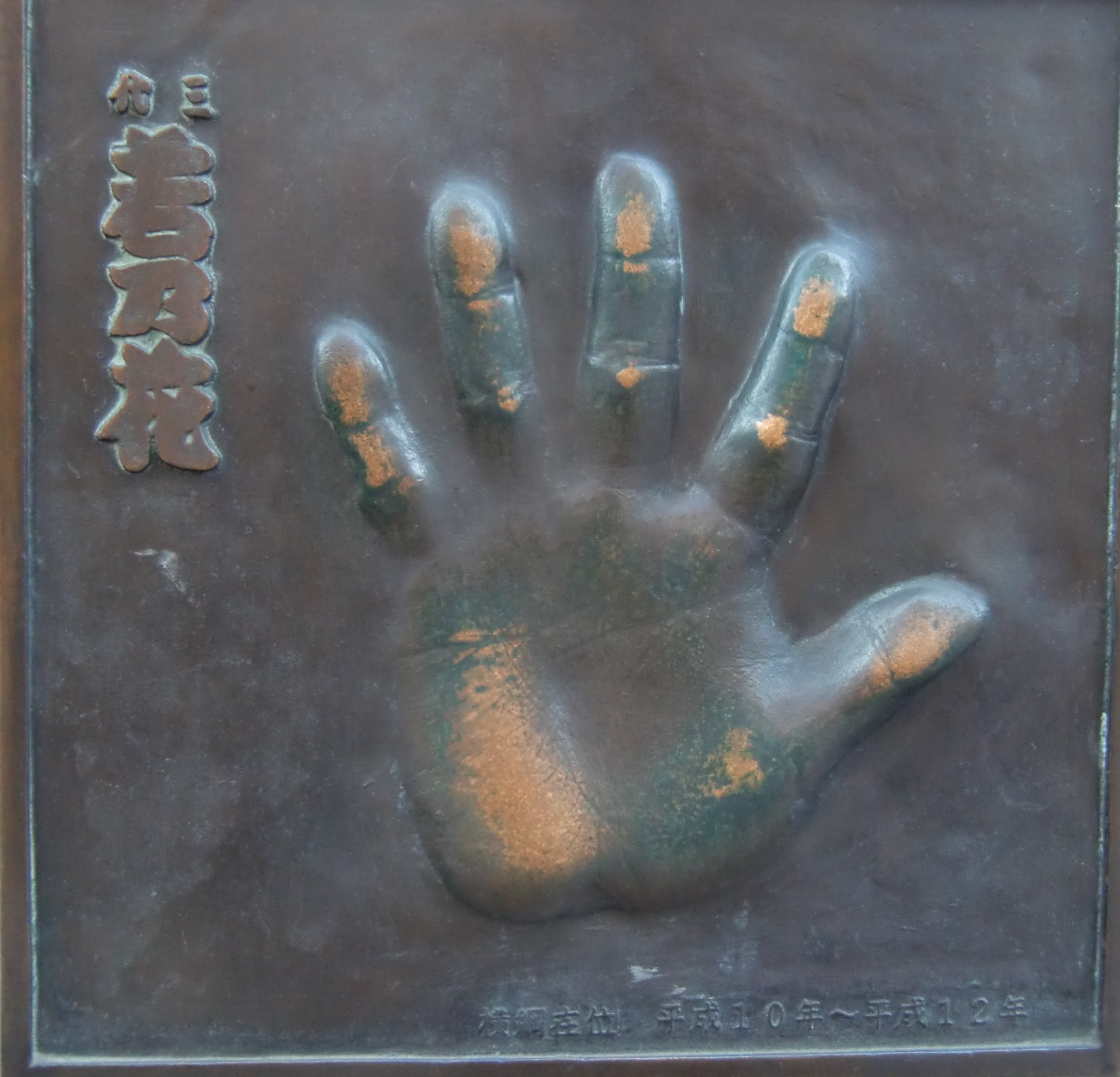
Wakanohana's handprint displayed on a monument in Ryōgoku, Tokyo

Wakanohana finally earned promotion to yokozuna in 1998 after winning two consecutive championships in March and May of that year. He had spent 29 tournaments at ōzeki before reaching the yokozuna rank, the third longest wait ever. He and Takanohana became the first pair of brothers to become yokozuna. However his time at sumo's highest rank was brief and injury plagued, and he was unable to add to his tally of championship wins. The best result he had as a yokozuna was in January 1999 when he came into the final day of the tournament as leader on 13–1. However he was defeated by Chiyotaikai and, in the subsequent playoff between them for the championship, he lost a rematch after the first bout was deemed by the judges to be too close to call, despite many observers feeling Wakanohana had clearly won the match. He was unable to complete the next three tournaments due to a leg sprain, and then his refusal to withdraw from his comeback tournament in September 1999 despite suffering a torn thigh muscle on the tenth day ensured that he became only the second yokozuna ever to finish a 15-day tournament with more losses than wins (the other yokozuna to suffer this fate was Ōnokuni, exactly ten years previously). He resolved to continue wrestling after consulting with his father, and was also supported by the head of the Japan Sumo Association, the former Yutakayama Katsuo, who said he saw no reason for retirement as his poor record was directly caused by injury.

After sitting out the next two tournaments Wakanohana returned in March 2000, even though he was not fully recovered from his injury, with most observers expecting him to wait until May. After losing three of his first five bouts he announced his retirement from sumo. He had been at sumo's top rank for only 11 tournaments, withdrawing from or missing six of them, and at 29 years of age, he was the sixth youngest yokozuna to retire. It was noted by a member of the Yokozuna Deliberation Council that had he not been promoted he would have been remembered as a fine ōzeki like his father, rather than as a disappointing yokozuna.

=== Fighting style ===
Wakanohana was noted for his wide range of techniques, winning the prestigious Technique prize on six occasions. His favourite grip on his opponent's mawashi was hidari-yotsu, a right hand outside, left hand inside position. His most common winning kimarite was yorikiri, or force out, followed by oshidashi or push out. Together these two techniques accounted for almost fifty percent of his career victories. He had knowledge of a wide range of throwing moves, such as uwatenage (overarm throw), shitatenage (underarm throw), sukuinage (scoop throw) and kubinage (neck throw), as well as extremely rare techniques such as amiuchi (the fisherman's throw), kawazugake (hooking backward counter throw) and susoharai (rear footsweep).

== After sumo ==
After a brief spell as a member (or elder) of the Japan Sumo Association, he eventually left sumo completely and has worked as an entertainer in Japan, as well as trying to enter the professional world of American football. On March 23, 2002, Hanada signed with the Arizona Rattlers. Wakanohana owned and operated a chain of chanko nabe (literally "meal pot", the staple food of sumo wrestlers) restaurants in Japan called "Chanko Dining Waka". On May 6, 2010, it was announced in the news that the "Chanko Dining Waka" chain was filing for bankruptcy, citing debts of over 147 million yen.

Wakanohana published his autobiography, Dokuhaku: Strong Spirit (独白―ストロング・スピリット) in 2000. He wrote of his constant fear during his career that he could be badly injured in a bout, and revealed that he never slept well during tournaments.

It was announced in October 2007, he was divorcing his wife Mieko, whom he married in June 1994 and with whom he had four children. He has since remarried and has another child with his new wife.

In 2011, Hanada started spelling his name 花田 虎上 professionally.

He stepped onto the dohyō at the Ryōgoku Kokugikan for the first time since his retirement in 2000 when he attended the 2018 Hakuhō Cup, an amateur sumo event for children.

In 2019 he appeared on Abema as a sumo commentator. This was his first work in sumo broadcasting in 15 years, having last appeared on NHK in 2004.

== Relationship with Takanohana ==
At the time of the death of their father on May 30, 2005, a bitter rift between Wakanohana and Takanohana was widely reported in the Japanese media. Upon his father's death, Takanohana was very critical of both his brother and his mother: his attacks on his brother (Wakanohana) relating to the struggle between them to control their father's funeral rites; the attacks on his mother condemning her for her extramarital affair (which led to her divorce from Futagoyama, and had only been rumored up to that point). There had been some speculation that all of this was related to who would control their father's estate. However, Wakanohana forfeited his claim to the estate not long after his father's funeral.

== Career record ==
Wakanohana Masaru
Year	January Hatsu basho, Tokyo	March Haru basho, Osaka	May Natsu basho, Tokyo	July Nagoya basho, Nagoya	September Aki basho, Tokyo	November Kyūshū basho, Fukuoka
1988	x	(Maezumo)	West Jonokuchi #10; 7–0; Champion	East Jonidan #47; 6–1	East Sandanme #86; 6–1	East Sandanme #34; 7–0–P; Champion
1989	East Makushita #22; 3–4	West Makushita #28; 4–3	West Makushita #20; 4–3	East Makushita #14; 5–2	East Makushita #5; 3–4	East Makushita #9; 6–1
1990	West Makushita #2; 4–3	West Jūryō #13; 9–6	West Jūryō #8; 10–5	East Jūryō #2; 12–3; Champion	West Maegashira #10; 8–7	West Maegashira #5; 6–9
1991	East Maegashira #10; 7–8	East Maegashira #12; 9–6	East Maegashira #7; 8–7	West Maegashira #2; 7–8	West Maegashira #3; 11–4; TO★	East Komusubi #2; 7–8
1992	West Maegashira #1; 10–5; T★	West Komusubi #1; 0–10–5	West Maegashira #7; 11–4; T	East Maegashira #1; 4–9–2	East Maegashira #9; 8–7	West Maegashira #4; 9–6
1993	East Maegashira #3; 10–5; T	East Komusubi #1; 14–1; TO	West Sekiwake #1; 10–5; O	East Sekiwake #1; 13–2–P; T	West Ōzeki #1; 9–6	West Ōzeki #1; 12–3
1994	East Ōzeki #1; 11–4	West Ōzeki #1; 3–4–8	West Ōzeki #2; Sat out due to injury 0–0–15	West Ōzeki #2; 14–1	West Ōzeki #1; 12–3	West Ōzeki #1; 8–7
1995	East Ōzeki #2; 12–3	West Ōzeki #1; 12–3	West Ōzeki #1; 9–6	West Ōzeki #1; 11–4	West Ōzeki #1; 10–5	West Ōzeki #1; 12–3–P
1996	East Ōzeki #1; 0–4–11	East Ōzeki #2; 12–3	East Ōzeki #1; 12–3	East Ōzeki #1; 10–5	West Ōzeki #1; 11–4	West Ōzeki #1; 11–4–P
1997	East Ōzeki #1; 14–1	East Ōzeki #1; 3–1–11	East Ōzeki #2; Sat out due to injury 0–0–15	East Ōzeki #2; 8–7	East Ōzeki #2; 12–3	East Ōzeki #2; 10–5
1998	East Ōzeki #2; 10–5	East Ōzeki #2; 14–1	East Ōzeki #1; 12–3	East Yokozuna #2; 10–5	West Yokozuna #2; 12–3	West Yokozuna #1; 9–6
1999	West Yokozuna #1; 13–2–P	East Yokozuna #1; 5–5–5	West Yokozuna #1; 3–5–7	East Yokozuna #2; Sat out due to injury 0–0–15	West Yokozuna #2; 7–8	West Yokozuna #2; Sat out due to injury 0–0–15
2000	East Yokozuna #2; Sat out due to injury 0–0–15	West Yokozuna #2; Retired; 2–4	x	x	x	x
Record given as wins–losses–absences Top division champion Top division runner-up Retired Lower divisions Non-participation Sanshō key: F=Fighting spirit; O=Outstanding performance; T=Technique Also shown: ★=Kinboshi; P=Playoff(s); Divisions: Makuuchi — Jūryō — Makushita — Sandanme — Jonidan — Jonokuchi Makuuchi ranks: Yokozuna — Ōzeki — Sekiwake — Komusubi — Maegashira

== See also ==
- List of yokozuna
- List of sumo tournament top division champions
- List of sumo tournament top division runners-up
- List of sumo tournament second division champions
- Glossary of sumo terms
- List of past sumo wrestlers

Preceded by Takanohana Kōji	66th Yokozuna; 1998–2000	Succeeded by Musashimaru Kōyō
Yokozuna is not a successive rank, and more than one wrestler can hold the title at once
