= Takanohana stable =

Defunct sumo stable

Coordinates: 35.6940°N 139.6753°E

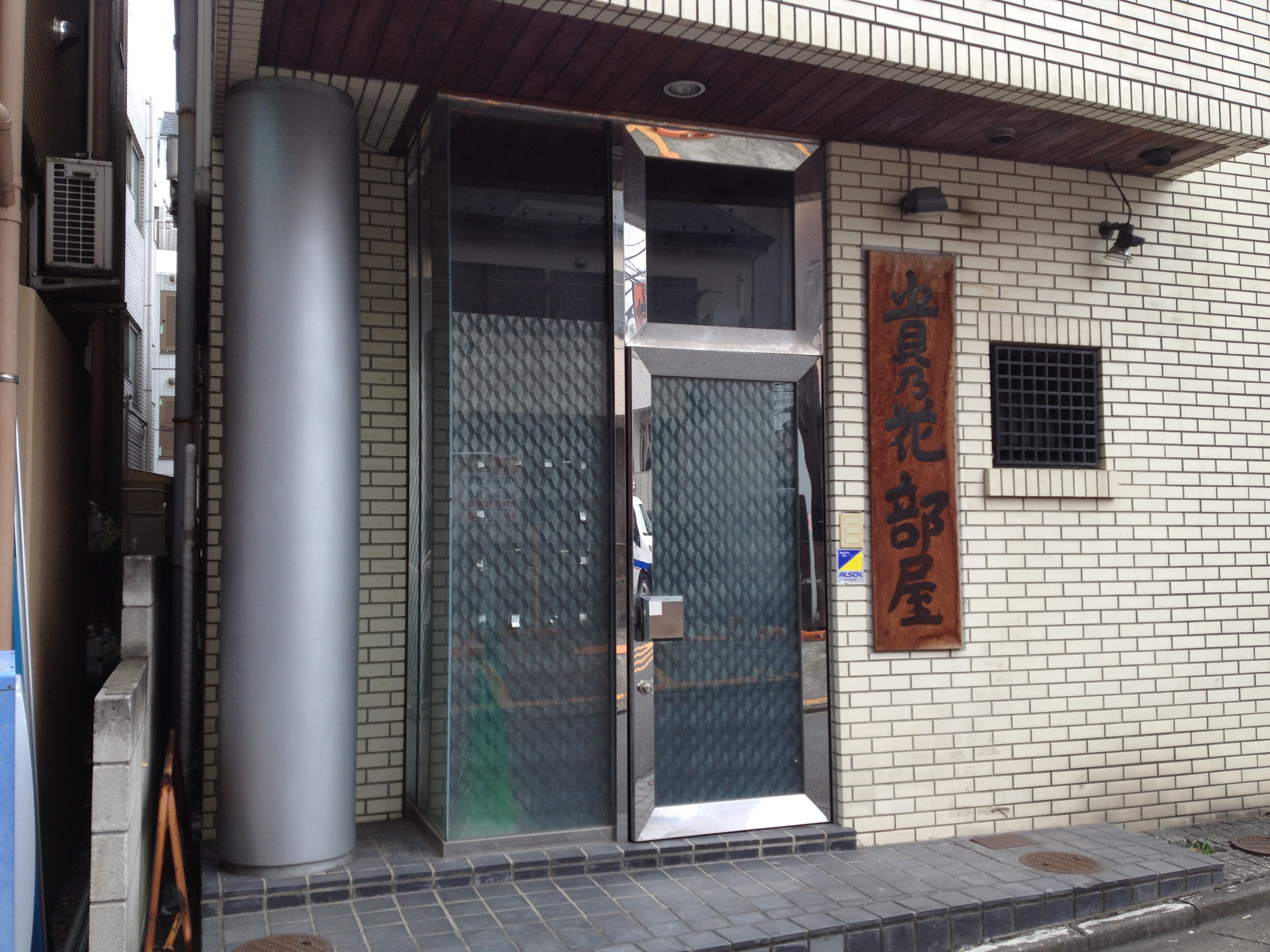
Front of Takanohana stable in August 2014

Takanohana stable (貴乃花部屋, Takanohana-beya) (2004–2018) was a sumo stable initially of the Nishonoseki group, later of its own Takanohana group.

The stable was created in 2004 when Takanohana Kōji took over the running of Futagoyama stable from his father Takanohana Kenshi. Formerly of the Nishonoseki ichimon or group of stables, it became the leader of a breakaway Takanohana group in 2010, which was formally recognized as an ichimon in 2014. It is one of the most successful sumo stables with 42 top division championships to its name, won by eight different wrestlers, if Futagoyama's history from 1962 is included. As of the September 2018 tournament the stable had eight wrestlers, including three sekitori. Takanohana resigned from the Japan Sumo Association shortly after that tournament and the stable was absorbed into Chiganoura stable on October 1, 2018.

== History ==
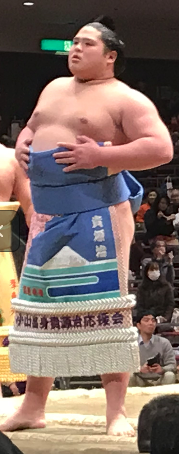
Takagenji is a sekitori produced by Takanohana Kōji

Futagoyama stable was established in 1962 by former yokozuna Wakanohana Kanji I, who branched off from Hanakago stable and converted his home near Minami-Asagaya Station into the stable headquarters. Its first sekitori was komusubi Futagodake. It was very strong in the late 1970s and early 1980s when it produced two yokozuna and two ōzeki, one of whom, Takanohana Kenshi, was the stable master's younger brother. From the promotion of Takanohana Kenshi to komusubi in May 1972 until the retirement of Wakashimazu in July 1987 the stable always had at least one wrestler in the titled san'yaku ranks.

Takanohana Kenshi established Fujishima stable upon his retirement as an active wrestler in 1982, and when his elder brother reached the mandatory oyakata retirement age of 65 in March 1993, Fujishima and Futagoyama stable were merged and continued under the Futagoyama name. At its peak in the mid-1990s the merged stable had a yokozuna, two ōzeki, and several other san'yaku regulars. During this period it had 50 wrestlers in total, and ten in the top division: Takanohana, Wakanohana III, Takanonami, Akinoshima, Takatōriki and Toyonoumi (from Fujishima) and Takamisugi, Misugisato, Naminohana and Wakashoyo (from Futagoyama). This dominance led to suggestions that the Japan Sumo Association should not have approved the merger, as it gave these wrestlers an unfair advantage over their opponents as they never had to face each other in tournament competition. Takanohana's yokozuna rival Akebono by contrast, had to fight everyone as there were no other wrestlers from his stable in the top two divisions.

By the early 2000s the stable had begun to decline, and in 2004 Takanohana Kenshi retired due to ill health. His son Takanohana Kōji took over, renaming the stable Takanohana-beya. The stable's last sekitori, Takanonami, retired shortly afterwards. Under Takanohana Kōji's stewardship the stable initially failed to attract many recruits, and retirements reduced the number of active wrestlers to as low as seven in 2007. Recruitment later picked up, with seven new wrestlers joining between the March 2008 and May 2009 tournaments. As of May 2012 the stable had thirteen wrestlers, among them a foreigner, Mongolian Takanoiwa, who was recruited in November 2008. In November 2009 he took the championship in the sandanme division, the first yūshō for the stable since it was renamed. Takanoiwa earned promotion to jūryō in May 2012, the first new sekitori at the stable since Gokenzan in March 1995, and reached the top makuuchi division in January 2014, ending a ten-year drought for the stable. Takanohana has also produced Takakeishō, who reached jūryō in 2016 and makuuchi the following year, and the identical twins Takagenji and Takayoshitoshi, who reached sekitori level in 2017 and 2018 respectively.

In January 2010 the Takanohana stable, along with the Ōnomatsu stable, Ōtake stable and the now defunct Magaki stable, was forced to leave the Nishonoseki ichimon after Takanohana declared his intention to run as an unofficial candidate in the elections to the Sumo Association's board of directors. In 2014 the four stables, and Tatsunami stable, formed their own ichimon, with Takanohana as its head. In June 2016, the stable moved from Nakano to new premises in Kōtō City, closer to the Ryōgoku Kokugikan. In June 2018 the Takanohana ichimon broke up in the wake of Takanohana's dismissal of the Japan Sumo Association's board of directors after the Takanoiwa affair, with Takanohana stable and Tatsunami stable going independent. The Ōnomatsu, Ōtake and Chiganoura stables re-joined Nishonoseki ichimon in September 2018. Takanohana refused to align his stable with another ichimon as the Sumo Association requested, and announced that he was leaving the Sumo Association, submitting a letter asking Takanohana stable's wrestlers and personnel to be transferred to Chiganoura stable. This took effect on October 1, 2018.

== Ring name conventions ==
Most wrestlers at this stable took ring names or shikona that begin with the character 貴 (read: taka), in deference their coach and the stable's owner, the former Takanohana II, as well his father Takanohana I, who ran the previous incarnation of the stable.

== Owners ==
- 2004–2018: Takanohana Kōji (toshiyori, 65th yokozuna, Takanohana II)
- 1993–2004: 11th Futagoyama, (ōzeki, Takanohana I)
- 1962–1993: 10th Futagoyama, (45th yokozuna, Wakanohana I)

== Notable former members ==
- Wakanohana Kanji II (56th yokozuna)
- Takanosato (59th yokozuna)
- Wakanohana Masaru (66th yokozuna)
- Takanohana Kenshi (ōzeki)
- Wakashimazu (ōzeki)
- Takanonami (ōzeki)
- Takatōriki (sekiwake)
- Akinoshima (sekiwake)
- Wakajishi (komusubi)
- Takamisugi (komusubi)
- Takakeishō (best rank komusubi, later ōzeki after transfer)
- Takanoiwa (maegashira)
- Takagenji (best rank jūryō, later maegashira after transfer)
- Takanofuji (jūryō)
- Takakento (best rank makushita, later jūryō after transfer)

== Location and access ==
Tokyo, Kōtō ward, Higashi Suna 4-7-6
13 minute walk from Minami-sunamachi Station on the Tōzai Line

== See also ==
- List of sumo stables
- List of sumo elders
- List of active sumo wrestlers
- List of past sumo wrestlers
- List of years in sumo
- Glossary of sumo terms
