= Masudayama Yasuhito =

Japanese sumo wrestler

Personal information
- Native name: 舛田山 靖仁
- Born: Shigeru Masuda; 10 April 1951 (age 75) Nanao, Ishikawa, Japan
- Height: 1.87 m (6 ft 1 1/2 in)
- Weight: 152 kg (335 lb)

Sport
- Sport: Sumo
- Retired: July, 1989
- Heya: Kasugano
- Record: 626-671-37
- Debut: March, 1974
- Highest rank: Sekiwake (September, 1983)
- Elder name: Tokiwayama, Chiganoura
- Championships: 1 (Jūryō)
- Special Prizes: Outstanding Performance (2); Fighting Spirit (1)
- Gold Stars: 1 (Wakanohana II)
- Updated on Nov 27, 2020

Masudayama Yasuhito (舛田山 靖仁, born 10 April 1951 as Shigeru Masuda) is a former sumo wrestler from Nanao, Ishikawa, Japan. He made his professional debut in March 1974, and reached the top division in November 1976. His highest rank was sekiwake. He retired in July 1989 and became an elder in the Japan Sumo Association under the name Chiganoura. He was the oldest man in any of the professional sumo divisions at the time of his retirement. He set up Chiganoura stable (now renamed Tokiwayama stable) in 2004 at the age of 53, after he was passed over for the head coach position at Kasugano stable the previous year. He retired upon reaching 65 years of age in April 2016, but was re-employed by his stable as a consultant, which expired upon his 70th birthday in April 2021. He continued to live at the old Chiganoura stable premises after it relocated earlier in 2021.

== Career record ==
Masudayama Yasuhito
| Year | January Hatsu basho, Tokyo | March Haru basho, Osaka | May Natsu basho, Tokyo | July Nagoya basho, Nagoya | September Aki basho, Tokyo | November Kyūshū basho, Fukuoka |
|---|---|---|---|---|---|---|
| 1974 | x | Makushita tsukedashi #60; 5–2 | East Makushita #39; 6–1 | West Makushita #14; 5–2 | East Makushita #5; 5–2 | East Makushita #2; 6–1 |
| 1975 | West Jūryō #11; 9–6 | East Jūryō #7; 8–7 | West Jūryō #4; 6–9 | East Jūryō #7; 5–3–7 | East Jūryō #13; Sat out due to injury 0–0–15 | East Jūryō #13; 5–10 |
| 1976 | West Makushita #6; 5–2 | West Makushita #2; 5–2 | East Jūryō #13; 9–6 | East Jūryō #7; 8–7 | West Jūryō #6; 9–6 | West Maegashira #13; 8–7 |
| 1977 | East Maegashira #9; 8–7 | East Maegashira #4; 5–10 | East Maegashira #10; 6–9 | East Maegashira #13; 8–7 | West Maegashira #10; 8–7 | East Maegashira #9; 8–7 |
| 1978 | East Maegashira #7; 6–9 | East Maegashira #11; 9–6 | East Maegashira #6; 8–7 | East Maegashira #3; 5–10 | West Maegashira #7; 5–10 | East Maegashira #13; 9–6 |
| 1979 | West Maegashira #5; 6–9 | West Maegashira #7; 6–9 | West Maegashira #10; 8–7 | West Maegashira #8; 6–9 | East Maegashira #13; 10–5 | West Maegashira #5; 5–10 |
| 1980 | West Maegashira #10; 3–12 | East Jūryō #5; 11–4 | West Maegashira #13; 11–4; F | East Maegashira #3; 5–10 | West Maegashira #9; 8–7 | East Maegashira #3; 9–6; O★ |
| 1981 | East Komusubi #1; 5–10 | West Maegashira #3; 8–7 | West Maegashira #1; 6–9 | East Maegashira #5; 5–10 | East Maegashira #9; 3–7–5 | West Jūryō #4; Sat out due to injury 0–0–15 |
| 1982 | West Jūryō #4; 6–9 | West Jūryō #8; 9–6 | East Jūryō #4; 10–5 | West Maegashira #13; 8–7 | West Maegashira #9; 9–6 | West Maegashira #3; 6–9 |
| 1983 | East Maegashira #6; 8–7 | West Maegashira #1; 6–9 | West Maegashira #3; 8–7 | West Komusubi #1; 8–7; O | East Sekiwake #1; 3–12 | East Maegashira #5; 8–7 |
| 1984 | West Komusubi #1; 3–12 | West Maegashira #6; 6–9 | West Maegashira #11; 9–6 | West Maegashira #5; 6–9 | East Maegashira #10; 8–7 | West Maegashira #5; 6–9 |
| 1985 | West Maegashira #10; 8–7 | West Maegashira #6; 4–11 | East Maegashira #14; 2–13 | West Jūryō #7; 9–6 | East Jūryō #3; 8–7 | East Jūryō #2; 8–7 |
| 1986 | West Jūryō #1; 5–10 | West Jūryō #7; 9–6 | East Jūryō #3; 5–10 | East Jūryō #9; 8–7 | West Jūryō #5; 8–7 | East Jūryō #4; 6–9 |
| 1987 | East Jūryō #8; 9–6 | East Jūryō #5; 9–6 | East Jūryō #2; 5–10 | West Jūryō #7; 11–4; Champion | East Jūryō #1; 5–10 | East Jūryō #6; 9–6 |
| 1988 | West Jūryō #3; 5–10 | West Jūryō #7; 9–6 | West Jūryō #3; 6–9 | West Jūryō #7; 8–7 | West Jūryō #6; 7–8 | East Jūryō #8; 8–7 |
| 1989 | West Jūryō #4; 5–10 | East Jūryō #11; 8–7 | West Jūryō #8; 7–8 | West Jūryō #10; Retired; 4–11 | x | x |
Record given as wins–losses–absences Top division champion Top division runner-up Retired Lower divisions Non-participation Sanshō key: F=Fighting spirit; O=Outstanding performance; T=Technique Also shown: ★=Kinboshi; P=Playoff(s); Divisions: Makuuchi — Jūryō — Makushita — Sandanme — Jonidan — Jonokuchi Makuuchi ranks: Yokozuna — Ōzeki — Sekiwake — Komusubi — Maegashira

== See also ==
- Glossary of sumo terms
- List of past sumo wrestlers
- List of sumo elders
- List of sumo tournament second division champions
- List of sekiwake
