= Tochitaikai Yū =

Japanese professional sumo wrestler

Personal information
- Native name: 栃大海 雄
- Born: Takaaki Tsukahara; 12 October 1999 (age 27) Koshigaya, Saitama
- Height: 193 cm (76 in)
- Weight: 163 kg (359 lb; 25.7 st)

Sport
- Sport: Sumo
- Rank: see below
- Heya: Kasugano
- Debut: November 2017
- Highest rank: Maegashira 18 (May 2025)
- Championships: 1 (Jonidan); 1 (Jonokuchi)
- Updated on 22 May 2025

Tochitaikai Yū (Japanese: 栃大海 雄; born 12 October 1999 as Takaaki Tsukahara) is a professional sumo wrestler from Koshigaya, Saitama Prefecture, who is currently affiliated with the Kasugano stable. He is the older brother of Tokotochi, a former fifth-class tokoyama who also trained at the same stable.

== Early life and career ==
Tochitaikai began showing interest in sumo, as well as swimming and baseball, during his third year at Higashi-Koshigaya Elementary School in Koshigaya, Saitama, and subsequently began taking lessons the Iruma Junior Sumo Club. He attended Higashi Junior High School in Koshigaya; due to the school's lack of a sumo club, he transferred to Kurosu Junior High School in Iruma during his second year and joined their sumo club. In 2014, during his third year, he won the individual competition at the National Junior High School Sumo Championship, earning the title of junior high school yokozuna. He also won the team competition at the same tournament. He went on to Saitama Sakae High School, where his classmates included future rikishi's Kotoshoho and Oho. During his high school years, he won multiple team championships in the junior divisions at the Inter-High School Athletic Meet and the National Athletic Meet.

== Sumo career ==
Tochitaikai decided to pursue sumo after graduating high school, and entered the Kasugano stable. Prior to his high school graduation, he made his debut in the November 2017 tournament. In the January 2018 tournament, he was placed in the jonokuchi division and advanced to the championship match with a record of 6 wins and 1 loss, where he faced off against his former high school classmate, Kototebakari Toshiki (later known as Kotoshōhō Yoshinari). In the match, Tochitaikai avenged his earlier loss in the tournament to Kototebakari and won the jonokuchi championship. In the subsequent March tournament, he was promoted to the jonidan division where he beat Kototebakari in the opening match. Tochitaikai finished with 7 wins and no losses, winning his first jonidan championship. In May, he was promoted to the sandanme division. During the following tournament in July, Tochitaikai experienced his first losing record since his debut, but still earned promotion to the makushita division in the November tournament that year.

In the July 2019 tournament, Tochitaikai rose to seventh place in the western makushita division, and entered the top 15 makushita rankings for the first time. Prior to the November tournament of that year, he rose to fourth place in the eastern makushita division, entering the top 5 for the first time. He started the first half of the November tournament with 3 wins and 1 loss before facing Wakamotoharu in his first juryo match. Tochitaikai lost to Wakamotoharu and suffered three consecutive losses afterwards, resulting in a losing record.

Heading into the March 2020 tournament, Tochitaikai was ranked in 15th place in the makushita division, but quickly returned to fourth place in the west makushita division before the September 2022 tournament. That month, he won his second juryo match against Gonoyama in the tournament final, finishing with a winning record of 4 wins and 3 losses and staying in the top 5 in the makushita division. In the November tournament, where he was the second-ranked makushita in the eastern division, he lost his fifth match and finished with 3 wins and 4 losses.

In January 2023, Tochitaikai was ranked #5 in the eastern makushita division. During the tournament that month, he earned 5 wins and 2 losses, and was considered a strong candidate for promotion to Juryo after the tournament, pending the opening of a spot in the sekitori division. However, the ranking committee did not approve a promotion for Tochitaikai. In the following March tournament, he was ranked as the top makushita in the eastern division, but lost his first match against Ochiai (later known as Hakuohō), who had won the previous tournament's makushita division and was promoted to Juryo. Tochitaikai finished with 3 wins and 5 losses, missing out on promotion to Juryo. In the September tournament of the same year, he was again ranked as the top eastern makushita, but suffered four consecutive losses to start the event and again missed out on promotion to Juryo.

In the March 2024 tournament, Tochitaikai started with a 3–2 record in the western makushita division as the fourth-ranked rikishi. In his final two matches, he faced two juryo rikishis, Kotoeko and Akua, and won both matches. After the event, it was reported that his promotion to juryo would be finalized after the results of the seventh match. Regarding his promotion to sekitori just over six years after his debut, Tochitaikai said, "I'm glad I kept everyone waiting for so long." At the ranking organization meeting held on March 27, Tochitaikai was officially promoted to the juryo division in the May tournament. According to the Koshigaya City Sports Promotion Division, Tochitaikai would be the fourth sekitori from Koshigaya City to be promoted, following Abi. In the following May tournament, Tochitaikai was ranked 14th in the eastern Juryo division, and finished with an 8–7 record. In the July tournament, he reached 11th place in the eastern Juryo division, but then suffered a six-match losing streak to end up with a losing record by the tenth day. He then won three matches in a row before losing consecutive matches to Mitoryu and Oshoumi in the makushita division, finishing with a 5–10 record. Prior to the next September tournament, Tochitaikai was demoted back to the makushita division, having lasted just two tournaments as a sekitori. In the September tournament, he finished with a record of 4 wins and 3 losses as the top eastern makushita wrestler and was promoted back to juryo, replacing Aoiyama, who was demoted to makushita following the event. Tochitaikai's promotion preserved the Kasugano stable's record of consecutive active sekitori in the juryo division for the first time since 1935.

Tochitaikai started the November tournament with a record of 10 wins and 4 losses, putting himself in good position to win the juryo championship. However, he lost to Shiden on the fifteenth day and fell short of the title. The event was his first tournament with double-digit wins as a sekitori.

Tochitaki ended the January and March 2025 tournaments with winning records, and continued to steadily rise in the rankings. In the May tournament, he made his debut as the 18th eastern maegashira rikishi in the makuuchi division. However, after winning just four matches, he returned to jūryō for the following tournament.

Tochitaikai was forced to withdraw from the January 2026 tournament after suffering a medial collateral ligament injury to his right knee during his match against Fujiryoga on the ninth day of the event. He finished the tournament with three wins and six losses.

== Career record ==
Tochitaikai Yū
Year	January Hatsu basho, Tokyo	March Haru basho, Osaka	May Natsu basho, Tokyo	July Nagoya basho, Nagoya	September Aki basho, Tokyo	November Kyūshū basho, Fukuoka
2017	x	x	x	x	x	(Maezumō)
2018	West Jonokuchi #20; 6–1; Champion	West Jonidan #42; 7–0; Champion	West Sandanme #42; 4–3	West Sandanme #27; 3–4	East Sandanme #46; 6–1	East Makushita #57; 5–2
2019	East Makushita #39; 4–3	East Makushita #30; 4–3	West Makushita #24; 6–1	West Makushita #7; 2–5	East Makushita #15; 5–2	East Makushita #4; 3–4
2020	East Makushita #7; 2–5	West Makushita #15; 4–3	East Makushita #12; Tournament Cancelled; State of Emergency; 0–0–0	East Makushita #12; 4–3	West Makushita #7; 3–4	West Makushita #14; 4–3
2021	West Makushita #9; 3–4	West Makushita #14; 2–5	West Makushita #24; 5–2	East Makushita #13; 4–3	West Makushita #8; 3–4	East Makushita #17; 5–2
2022	East Makushita #10; 2–5	East Makushita #22; 5–2	West Makushita #11; 5–2	West Makushita #6; 4–3	West Makushita #4; 4–3	East Makushita #2; 3–4
2023	East Makushita #5; 5–2	East Makushita #1; 3–5	West Makushita #10; 4–3	West Makushita #7; 6–1	East Makushita #1; 1–6	East Makushita #15; 4–3
2024	East Makushita #11; 5–2	West Makushita #4; 5–2	East Jūryō #14; 8–7	East Jūryō #11; 5–10	East Makushita #1; 4–3	West Jūryō #12; 10–5
2025	East Jūryō #7; 8–7	West Jūryō #3; 9–6	East Maegashira #18; 4–11	East Jūryō #4; 7–8	East Jūryō #5; 7–8	West Jūryō #5; 6–9
2026	East Jūryō #7; 3–7–5	West Makushita #1; 4–3	East Jūryō #14; 7–8	East Jūryō #14; 7–8	East Jūryō #14; 5–10	West Makushita #3; 3–4
Record given as wins–losses–absences Top division champion Top division runner-up Retired Non-participation Jūryō Lower divisions Sanshō key: F=Fighting spirit; O=Outstanding performance; T=Technique Also shown: ★=Kinboshi; P=Playoff(s); Divisions: Makuuchi — Jūryō — Makushita — Sandanme — Jonidan — Jonokuchi Makuuchi ranks: Yokozuna — Ōzeki — Sekiwake — Komusubi — Maegashira

== See also ==
- Glossary of sumo terms
- List of active sumo wrestlers
