= 2023 in sumo =

The following are the events in professional sumo during 2023.

== Tournaments ==
=== January ===
Hatsu basho

Ryōgoku Kokugikan, Tokyo, 8 January – 22 January

2023 Hatsu basho results - Makuuchi Division
W		L		A	East			Rank	West			W		L		A
0	-	0	-	15	ø	(Mongolia)	Terunofuji	Y	ø			0	-	0	-	0
0	-	0	-	0	ø			O		(Japan)	**Takakeishō**	12	-	3	-	0
9	-	6	-	0		(Japan)	**Wakatakakage**	S		(Mongolia)	**Hōshōryū**	8	-	7	-	0
1	-	5	-	9	ø	(Japan)	Takayasu	S		(Japan)	Shōdai	6	-	9	-	0
11	-	4	-	0		(Mongolia)	**Kiribayama**	K		(Japan)	**Kotonowaka**	8	-	7	-	0
5	-	10	-	0		(Japan)	Meisei	K		(Japan)	**Wakamotoharu**	9	-	6	-	0
8	-	7	-	0		(Japan)	**Tobizaru**	M1		(Japan)	**Daieishō**	10	-	5	-	0
7	-	8	-	0		(Japan)	Mitakeumi	M2		(Mongolia)	**Tamawashi**	9	-	6	-	0
8	-	7	-	0		(Japan)	**Abi**	M3		(Japan)	Midorifuji	6	-	9	-	0
4	-	11	-	0		(Japan)	Nishikifuji	M4		(Japan)	Sadanoumi	6	-	9	-	0
9	-	6	-	0		(Japan)	**Ryūden**	M5		(Japan)	**Nishikigi**	9	-	6	-	0
7	-	8	-	0		(Japan)	Hokutofuji	M6		(Japan)	Myōgiryū	6	-	9	-	0
0	-	0	-	15	ø	(Mongolia)	Ichinojō	M7		(Japan)	Ura	7	-	8	-	0
10	-	5	-	0		(Japan)	**Ōnoshō**	M8		(Japan)	Ōhō	4	-	11	-	0
6	-	9	-	0		(Japan)	Takanoshō	M9		(Japan)	**Endō**	9	-	6	-	0
8	-	7	-	0		(Bulgaria)	**Aoiyama**	M10		(Japan)	**Hiradoumi**	8	-	7	-	0
5	-	10	-	0		(Mongolia)	Chiyoshōma	M11	ø	(Georgia (country))	Tochinoshin	2	-	3	-	10
7	-	8	-	0		(Japan)	Kagayaki	M12	ø	(Japan)	Okinoumi	0	-	6	-	9
11	-	4	-	0		(Japan)	**Kotoshōhō**	M13		(Japan)	Kotoekō	7	-	8	-	0
10	-	5	-	0		(Japan)	**Ichiyamamoto**	M14		(Mongolia)	**Azumaryū**	9	-	6	-	0
7	-	8	-	0		(Japan)	Tsurugishō	M15		(Mongolia)	Mitoryū	7	-	8	-	0
8	-	7	-	0		(Japan)	**Takarafuji**	M16		(Japan)	Chiyomaru	4	-	11	-	0

ø - Indicates a pull-out or absent rank
**winning record in bold**
**Yūshō Winner**

=== March ===
Haru basho

Osaka Prefectural Gymnasium, Osaka, 12 March – 26 March

2023 Haru basho results - Makuuchi Division
W		L		A	East			Rank	West			W		L		A
0	-	0	-	15	ø	(Mongolia)	Terunofuji	Y	ø			0	-	0	-	0
0	-	0	-	0	ø			O	ø	(Japan)	Takakeishō	3	-	4	-	8
7	-	7	-	1	ø	(Japan)	Wakatakakage	S		(Mongolia)	**Hōshōryū**	10	-	5	-	0
12	-	3	-	0		(Mongolia)	**Kiribayama***	S	ø			0	-	0	-	0
11	-	4	-	0		(Japan)	**Wakamotoharu**	K		(Japan)	**Kotonowaka**	9	-	6	-	0
12	-	3	-	0		(Japan)	**Daieishō**	K		(Japan)	Tobizaru	6	-	9	-	0
3	-	12	-	0		(Mongolia)	Tamawashi	M1		(Japan)	**Shōdai**	10	-	5	-	0
9	-	6	-	0		(Japan)	**Abi**	M2		(Japan)	Ryūden	2	-	13	-	0
4	-	11	-	0		(Japan)	Mitakeumi	M3		(Japan)	Nishikigi	6	-	9	-	0
4	-	5	-	6	ø	(Japan)	Ōnoshō	M4		(Japan)	Meisei	5	-	10	-	0
6	-	9	-	0		(Japan)	Kotoshōhō	M5		(Japan)	**Midorifuji**	10	-	5	-	0
9	-	6	-	0		(Japan)	**Endō**	M6		(Japan)	Sadanoumi	6	-	9	-	0
7	-	8	-	0		(Japan)	Hokutofuji	M7		(Japan)	**Takayasu**	10	-	5	-	0
4	-	11	-	0		(Japan)	Ichiyamamoto	M8		(Japan)	**Ura**	9	-	6	-	0
6	-	9	-	0		(Bulgaria)	Aoiyama	M9		(Japan)	Hiradoumi	7	-	8	-	0
5	-	10	-	0		(Japan)	Myōgiryū	M10		(Japan)	**Nishikifuji**	10	-	5	-	0
4	-	11	-	0		(Mongolia)	Azumaryū	M11		(Japan)	**Takanoshō**	8	-	7	-	0
5	-	10	-	0		(Japan)	Kagayaki	M12		(Japan)	**Takarafuji**	8	-	7	-	0
8	-	7	-	0		(Mongolia)	**Daishōhō**	M13		(Japan)	**Kotoekō**	8	-	7	-	0
11	-	4	-	0		(Kazakhstan)	**Kinbōzan**	M14		(Japan)	Bushōzan	5	-	10	-	0
9	-	6	-	0		(Japan)	**Hokuseihō**	M15		(Japan)	Ōhō	7	-	8	-	0
9	-	6	-	0		(Mongolia)	**Chiyoshōma**	M16		(Japan)	**Tsurugishō**	8	-	7	-	0
8	-	7	-	0		(Mongolia)	**Mitoryū**	M17	ø			0	-	0	-	0

ø - Indicates a pull-out or absent rank
**winning record in bold**
**Yūshō Winner**
***Won Playoff**

=== May ===
Natsu basho

Ryōgoku Kokugikan, Tokyo, 14 May – 28 May

W		L		A	East			Rank	West			W		L		A
14	-	1	-	0		(Mongolia)	**Terunofuji**	Y	ø			0	-	0	-	0
0	-	0	-	0	ø			O		(Japan)	**Takakeishō**	8	-	7	-	0
11	-	4	-	0		(Mongolia)	**Kiribayama**	S		(Mongolia)	**Hōshōryū**	11	-	4	-	0
10	-	5	-	0		(Japan)	**Daieishō**	S		(Japan)	**Wakamotoharu**	10	-	5	-	0
8	-	7	-	0		(Japan)	**Kotonowaka**	K	ø	(Japan)	Wakatakakage	0	-	0	-	15
6	-	9	-	0		(Japan)	Shōdai	K	ø			0	-	0	-	0
8	-	7	-	0		(Japan)	**Abi**	M1		(Japan)	Midorifuji	6	-	9	-	0
3	-	3	-	9		(Japan)	Takayasu	M2	ø	(Japan)	Endō	0	-	7	-	8
8	-	7	-	0		(Japan)	**Tobizaru**	M3		(Japan)	Nishikifuji	3	-	12	-	0
7	-	8	-	0		(Japan)	Ura	M4		(Japan)	**Nishikigi**	9	-	6	-	0
4	-	11	-	0		(Kazakhstan)	Kinbōzan	M5		(Japan)	Kotoshōhō	2	-	10	-	3
8	-	7	-	0		(Japan)	**Meisei**	M6		(Japan)	**Mitakeumi**	9	-	6	-	0
6	-	9	-	0		(Japan)	Hokutofuji	M7		(Mongolia)	Tamawashi	7	-	8	-	0
7	-	8	-	0		(Japan)	Sadanoumi	M8		(Japan)	Takanoshō	7	-	8	-	0
8	-	7	-	0		(Japan)	**Ōnoshō**	M9		(Japan)	**Hiradoumi**	9	-	6	-	0
5	-	10	-	0		(Japan)	Ryūden	M10		(Japan)	Takarafuji	5	-	10	-	0
8	-	7	-	0		(Japan)	**Hokuseihō**	M11		(Mongolia)	Daishōhō	6	-	9	-	0
5	-	10	-	0		(Bulgaria)	Aoiyama	M12		(Japan)	**Kotoekō**	8	-	7	-	0
8	-	7	-	0		(Mongolia)	**Chiyoshōma**	M13	ø	(Mongolia)	Ichinojō	0	-	0	-	0
12	-	3	-	0		(Japan)	**Asanoyama**	M14		(Japan)	**Myōgiryū**	9	-	6	-	0
4	-	11	-	0		(Japan)	Ichiyamamoto	M15		(Japan)	**Tsurugishō**	9	-	6	-	0
5	-	10	-	0		(Mongolia)	Mitoryū	M16		(Japan)	**Ōhō**	11	-	4	-	0
7	-	8	-	0		(Japan)	Kagayaki	M17	ø			0	-	0	-	0

ø - Indicates a pull-out or absent rank
**winning record in bold**
**Yūshō Winner**

=== July ===
Nagoya basho

Aichi Prefectural Gymnasium, Nagoya, 9 July – 23 July

2023 Nagoya basho results - Makuuchi Division
W		L		A	East			Rank	West			W		L		A
1	-	3	-	11	ø	(Mongolia)	Terunofuji	Y	ø			0	-	0	-	0
0	-	0	-	15	ø	(Japan)	Takakeishō	O		(Mongolia)	Kirishima	6	-	7	-	2
12	-	3	-	0		(Mongolia)	**Hōshōryū***	S		(Japan)	**Daieishō**	9	-	6	-	0
0	-	0	-	0	ø			S		(Japan)	**Wakamotoharu**	9	-	6	-	0
11	-	4	-	0		(Japan)	**Kotonowaka**	K		(Japan)	Abi	6	-	9	-	0
10	-	5	-	0		(Japan)	**Nishikigi**	M1		(Japan)	**Tobizaru**	9	-	6	-	0
6	-	9	-	0		(Japan)	Shōdai	M2		(Japan)	Mitakeumi	3	-	12	-	0
4	-	11	-	0		(Japan)	Midorifuji	M3		(Japan)	**Meisei**	8	-	7	-	0
8	-	4	-	3		(Japan)	**Asanoyama**	M4		(Japan)	Ura	7	-	8	-	0
5	-	10	-	0	ø	(Japan)	Hiradoumi	M5		(Japan)	Ōnoshō	6	-	9	-	0
5	-	10	-	0		(Japan)	Hokuseihō	M6		(Japan)	Ōhō	6	-	9	-	0
7	-	8	-	0		(Japan)	Takayasu	M7		(Mongolia)	**Tamawashi**	8	-	7	-	0
5	-	10	-	0		(Japan)	Sadanoumi	M8		(Japan)	Nishikifuji	5	-	10	-	0
8	-	7	-	0		(Japan)	**Takanoshō**	M9		(Japan)	**Hokutofuji**	12	-	3	-	0
7	-	8	-	0		(Kazakhstan)	Kinbōzan	M10		(Japan)	Myōgiryū	6	-	9	-	0
8	-	7	-	0		(Japan)	**Kotoekō**	M11		(Japan)	Tsurugishō	5	-	10	-	0
6	-	9	-	0		(Mongolia)	Chiyoshōma	M12	ø	(Japan)	Wakatakakage	0	-	0	-	15
10	-	5	-	0		(Japan)	**Gōnoyama**	M13		(Japan)	Kotoshōhō	7	-	8	-	0
6	-	9	-	0		(Mongolia)	Daishōhō	M14		(Japan)	**Shōnannoumi**	10	-	5	-	0
10	-	5	-	0		(Japan)	**Ryūden**	M15		(Japan)	**Takarafuji**	9	-	6	-	0
10	-	5	-	0		(Japan)	**Endō**	M16		(Japan)	Bushōzan	3	-	12	-	0
9	-	6	-	0		(Bulgaria)	**Aoiyama**	M17		(Japan)	**Hakuōhō**	11	-	4	-	0

ø - Indicates a pull-out or absent rank
**winning record in bold**
**Yūshō Winner**
*** Won Playoff**

=== September ===
Aki basho

Ryōgoku Kokugikan, Tokyo, 10 September – 24 September

2023 Aki basho results - Makuuchi Division
W		L		A	East			Rank	West			W		L		A
0	-	0	-	15	ø	(Mongolia)	Terunofuji	Y	ø			0	-	0	-	0
9	-	6	-	0		(Mongolia)	**Kirishima**	O		(Japan)	**Takakeishō***	11	-	4	-	0
0	-	0	-	0	ø			O		(Mongolia)	**Hōshōryū**	8	-	7	-	0
10	-	5	-	0		(Japan)	**Daieishō**	S		(Japan)	**Wakamotoharu**	9	-	6	-	0
9	-	6	-	0		(Japan)	**Kotonowaka**	S	ø			0	-	0	-	0
5	-	10	-	0		(Japan)	Nishikigi	K		(Japan)	Tobizaru	6	-	9	-	0
8	-	7	-	0		(Japan)	**Hokutofuji**	M1		(Japan)	Meisei	7	-	8	-	0
9	-	6	-	0		(Japan)	**Abi**	M2		(Japan)	**Asanoyama**	9	-	6	-	0
8	-	7	-	0		(Japan)	**Shōdai**	M3		(Mongolia)	Tamawashi	2	-	13	-	0
6	-	9	-	0		(Japan)	Takanoshō	M4		(Japan)	**Ura**	9	-	6	-	0
9	-	6	-	0		(Japan)	**Gōnoyama**	M5		(Japan)	Shōnannoumi	7	-	8	-	0
9	-	6	-	0		(Japan)	**Ōnoshō**	M6		(Japan)	Ryūden	6	-	9	-	0
10	-	5	-	0		(Japan)	**Takayasu**	M7		(Japan)	Ōhō	5	-	10	-	0
6	-	9	-	0		(Japan)	Kotoekō	M8		(Japan)	Hiradoumi	6	-	9	-	0
10	-	5	-	0		(Japan)	**Midorifuji**	M9	ø	(Japan)	Hakuōhō	0	-	0	-	15
9	-	6	-	0		(Kazakhstan)	**Kinbōzan**	M10		(Japan)	**Endō**	9	-	6	-	0
9	-	6	-	0		(Japan)	**Mitakeumi**	M11		(Japan)	**Hokuseihō**	10	-	5	-	0
7	-	8	-	0		(Japan)	Takarafuji	M12		(Japan)	**Sadanoumi**	8	-	7	-	0
10	-	5	-	0		(Japan)	**Myōgiryū**	M13		(Japan)	Nishikifuji	5	-	10	-	0
5	-	10	-	0		(Bulgaria)	Aoiyama	M14		(Japan)	Kotoshōhō	5	-	10	-	0
11	-	4	-	0		(Japan)	**Atamifuji**	M15		(Mongolia)	Chiyoshōma	3	-	12	-	0
5	-	10	-	0		(Japan)	Kagayaki	M16		(Japan)	**Tsurugishō**	8	-	7	-	0
3	-	12	-	0		(Mongolia)	Daishōhō	M17	ø			0	-	0	-	0

ø - Indicates a pull-out or absent rank
**winning record in bold**
**Yūshō Winner**
***Won Playoff**

=== November ===
Kyushu basho

Fukuoka Kokusai Center, Kyushu, 12 November – 26 November

2023 Kyushu basho results - Makuuchi Division
W		L		A	East			Rank	West			W		L		A
0	-	0	-	15	ø	(Mongolia)	Terunofuji	Y	ø			0	-	0	-	0
9	-	6	-	0		(Japan)	**Takakeishō**	O		(Mongolia)	**Kirishima**	13	-	2	-	0
0	-	0	-	0	ø			O		(Mongolia)	**Hōshōryū**	10	-	5	-	0
9	-	6	-	0		(Japan)	**Daieishō**	S		(Japan)	Wakamotoharu	6	-	9	-	0
11	-	4	-	0		(Japan)	**Kotonowaka**	S	ø			0	-	0	-	0
6	-	9	-	0		(Japan)	Abi	K		(Japan)	Hokutofuji	5	-	10	-	0
4	-	4	-	7		(Japan)	Asanoyama	M1		(Japan)	**Ura**	8	-	7	-	0
6	-	9	-	0		(Japan)	Shōdai	M2		(Japan)	Meisei	4	-	11	-	0
10	-	5	-	0		(Japan)	**Takayasu**	M3		(Japan)	Tobizaru	7	-	8	-	0
8	-	7	-	0		(Japan)	**Gōnoyama**	M4		(Japan)	Nishikigi	7	-	8	-	0
3	-	12	-	0		(Japan)	Ōnoshō	M5		(Japan)	**Midorifuji**	9	-	6	-	0
7	-	8	-	0		(Japan)	Shōnannoumi	M6	ø	(Japan)	Takanoshō	5	-	6	-	4
7	-	8	-	0		(Japan)	Hokuseihō	M7		(Kazakhstan)	**Kinbōzan**	8	-	7	-	0
5	-	10	-	0		(Japan)	Endō	M8		(Japan)	**Atamifuji**	11	-	4	-	0
6	-	9	-	0		(Japan)	Myōgiryū	M9		(Japan)	**Mitakeumi**	8	-	7	-	0
10	-	5	-	0		(Japan)	**Ryūden**	M10	ø	(Japan)	Kotoekō	2	-	8	-	5
8	-	7	-	0		(Japan)	**Sadanoumi**	M11		(Japan)	**Hiradoumi**	9	-	6	-	0
8	-	7	-	0		(Japan)	**Ōhō**	M12		(Mongolia)	**Tamawashi**	9	-	6	-	0
6	-	9	-	0		(Japan)	Takarafuji	M13		(Japan)	**Tsurugishō**	9	-	6	-	0
7	-	8	-	0		(Japan)	Tomokaze	M14		(Japan)	**Ichiyamamoto**	11	-	4	-	0
5	-	10	-	0		(Japan)	Tōhakuryū	M15		(Japan)	**Churanoumi**	9	-	6	-	0
5	-	10	-	0		(Russia)	Rōga	M16		(Japan)	Nishikifuji	6	-	9	-	0
5	-	10	-	0		(Japan)	Kitanowaka	M17	ø			0	-	0	-	0

ø - Indicates a pull-out or absent rank
**winning record in bold**
**Yūshō Winner**

== News ==
=== January ===
- 4: Former sekiwake Toyonoshima, who had retired from professional sumo in April 2020, quits as a member of the Sumo Association in order to pursue a tarento career.
- 6: Yokozuna Terunofuji withdraws from the upcoming January tournament—his second straight absence from an entire basho—as he continues to recover from surgery on both of his knees.
- 14: Former sekiwake Okinoumi retires, ending an 18-year career in professional sumo competition. He withdrew from the January 2023 basho the previous day after he was defeated in his first five matches.
- 22: The top division championship is won by ōzeki Takakeishō, who defeats maegashira 13 Kotoshōhō in the final bout. Both wrestlers had come into the final day with identical 11–3 records. It is Takekeishō's third career championship and first since November 2020, and puts him in a strong position to seek promotion to yokozuna in the following tournament. Kotoshōhō, who had not produced a kachi-koshi or winning record since March 2022, wins his first Fighting Spirit Prize. He shares runner-up honours with Kiribayama, who also finishes on 11–4 and wins his first Technique Prize. Ōnoshō, who led the tournament outright on Day 12 at 10–2, finishes on 10–5 and misses out on a share of the Fighting Spirit Prize after defeat to Hōshōryū. Former ōzeki Shōdai, who was hoping to return to the rank by scoring at least ten wins, can only manage a 6–9 record. Another former ōzeki, Asanoyama, wins the jūryō division championship with a 14–1 record.
- 25: Promotions to the jūryō division are announced. The winner of the makushita division title, two-time high school yokozuna Ochiai, is promoted just one tournament after making his professional debut as a makushita tsukedashi entrant. It is the first time since the beginning of the Showa era that a wrestler has been promoted to jūryō in one tournament. The winner of the 2022 All Japan Corporate Sumo Championship, Ochiai is the first new sekitori for Miyagino stable since the former Hakuhō took over as stablemaster. The other jūryō debutant is 29-year-old Tamashōhō from Mongolia, who is the brother-in-law of Tamawashi. There are also two wrestlers returning to jūryō – Tokushōryū after just one tournament, and Tomokaze, who returns for the first time since a long injury layoff beginning in November 2019 saw him drop from the top division down to jonidan.
- 28: The retirement ceremony for the 69th yokozuna Hakuhō is held at the Ryōgoku Kokugikan. He performs the yokozuna dohyō-iri, or ring entering ceremony, for the last time with ōzeki Takakeishō and sekiwake Hōshōryū serving as the tachimochi (sword bearer) and tsuyuharai (dew sweeper), respectively. About 300 people take turns to cut the ōichōmage bun.
- 29: The retirement ceremony for former maegashira Toyohibiki is held at the Ryōgoku Kokugikan.

=== February ===
- 1: Ikazuchi (former komusubi Kakizoe) officially takes over the stable previously owned by Irumagawa (former sekiwake Tochitsukasa) ahead of the latter reaching Sumo's mandatory retirement age of 65 at the end of April. The renamed Ikazuchi stable is the first incarnation of the stable in over six decades.
- 4: The NHK charity sumo tournament is held at the Ryōgoku Kokugikan for the first time in three years. It was cancelled in 2021 and 2022 due to the COVID-19 pandemic.
- 11: The retirement ceremony for former komusubi Shōhōzan is held at the Ryōgoku Kokugikan.
- 27: The Sumo Association releases the banzuke for the March 2023 tournament in Osaka, also known as the Haru (spring) basho. There is no change in the top two ranks, with yokozuna Terunofuji expected to return to action after missing two tournaments (he would later withdraw), and the January champion—ōzeki Takakeishō—seeking to join him at sumo's top rank with a strong March performance. January runner-up Kiribayama is elevated to sekiwake for the first time in his career. Daieishō and Tobizaru, who were both demoted from komusubi for the January tournament, return to that rank for March. The top division sees three new faces: Kinbōzan, who enters makuuchi after just eight tournaments in professional sumo and is the first top division wrestler in history from Kazakhstan, Mongolian-born Hokuseihō, who was encouraged to enter sumo by his now-stablemaster Miyagino, and nine-year sumo veteran Bushōzan. One other wrestler, Daishōhō, returns to the top division for the first time since November 2019. Asanoyama, who has been climbing the sumo ladder again since completing his one-year (six tournament) suspension and had won the jūryō title in January, just misses promotion to makuuchi and is ranked at jūryō 1 for March.

=== March ===
- 2: Daisuke Yanagihara (former sandanme Kotokantetsu) files a lawsuit against the Japan Sumo Association and his former stablemaster Sadogatake (former sekiwake Kotonowaka) seeking over ¥4.1 million in monetary damages. Among his claims, the 25-year-old says he was forced to retire when he was told he could not withdraw from the January 2021 sumo tournament because of his concerns over contracting COVID-19. This occurred shortly after the Japanese government declared its second state of emergency over the virus in Tokyo and surrounding prefectures. Yanagihara also alleges mistreatment of lower-division wrestlers in Sadogatake stable.
- 10: Terunofuji withdraws from the March 2023 tournament, one day after stablemaster Isegahama suggested that there was "still something missing" upon observing the training of his Mongolian yokozuna. Terunofuji underwent knee surgery last October and has not participated in a professional sumo match since Day 9 of the September 2022 basho.
- 18: Ōzeki Takakeishō withdraws on Day 7 of the March 2023 basho after three losses, ending his bid for promotion to sumo's top rank. He had suffered a left knee injury during his Day 3 victory over Shōdai, which he aggravated when losing to Mitakeumi on Day 6. Takakeishō's withdrawal leaves the sumo tournament with no competing yokozuna or ōzeki for the first time since the start of the Shōwa era in 1926.
- 26: Mongolian sekiwake Kiribayama defeats komusubi Daieishō twice on the final day of the March 2023 tournament–once in their final scheduled match, and again in a playoff–to win the first top-division championship of his career. The playoff was set after Kiribayama's Day 15 victory left both him and Daieishō with 12–3 records. In the playoff, Kiribayama–who had a day of rest due to a default the previous day–used the same thrust down technique he used to defeat Daieishō the first time. The ringside judges had to make sure that Kiribayama did not accidentally step out of the dohyō before confirming the victory. The 26-year-old said after the competition that he didn't understand anything that was going on when he entered sumo in 2015, but "somehow, eight years later, I've made it this far." Kiribayama, who becomes sumo's ninth makuuchi champion from Mongolia, is now in a position to pursue promotion to the second-highest rank of ōzeki with a strong performance at the May basho. For using a variety of winning kimarite both Kiribayama and Daieishō receive the Ginō-shō (Technique prize) for the second and first time, respectively. The other special prize goes to new maegashira Kinbōzan of Kazakhstan, who received the Kantō-shō (Fighting Spirit prize) after securing 11 victories in his top-division debut.
  Another Mongolian, Ichinojō (14–1), secures the jūryō championship. The former sekiwake had just been demoted to the second-highest division after serving a one-tournament COVID-19-related suspension. Right behind Ichinojō in the jūryō standings is former ōzeki Asanoyama (13–2), who seeks to return to sumo's top division for the first time after COVID violations resulted in his suspension for one year.
- 29: The Sumo Association announces three promotions to the second-highest rank of jūryō for May. One of two newly promoted sekitori is Fujiseiun, who entered sumo two years ago. With the exception of a playoff loss, he went undefeated in his first three tournaments, with a jonokuchi and sandanme championship to his name. The other new jūryō competitor is Tokihayate, who started sumo in 2019 and clinched the jonidan championship in his second tournament. 14-year veteran Chiyosakae returns to jūryō after he was just demoted, having secured five wins at the rank of makushita 2 in the March tournament.
  Among the retirements announced by the Sumo Association is former maegashira Kagamiō, who concludes a two-decade career. Kagamiō fell off of the banzuke rankings after the July 2021 basho due to injury.

=== April ===
- 14: Stablemaster Arashio (former maegashira Sōkokurai) announces that sekiwake Wakatakakage will be sidelined for up to one year after undergoing reconstructive surgery on his right knee. He had damaged his right ACL and meniscus near the end of the March 2023 tournament during his match against komusubi Kotonowaka, forcing his withdrawal.

The spring jungyō (regional tours) were held at the following locations:

- 2: Ise Shrine, Mie (Ceremonial tournament)
- 3: Minoh, Osaka
- 4: Okazaki, Aichi
- 5: Inazawa, Aichi
- 6: Fukui
- 8: Jōetsu, Niigata
- 9: Nagano
- 15: Fujisawa, Kanagawa
- 16: Machida, Tokyo
- 17: Yasukuni Shrine, Tokyo (Ceremonial tournament)
- 22: Yokohama, Kanagawa
- 23: Takasaki, Gunma
- 28: Narita, Chiba
- 29: Kawasaki, Kanagawa
- 30: Kamisu, Ibaraki

=== May ===
- 1: The banzuke for the May 2023 tournament in Tokyo, called the Natsu basho, is published by the Sumo Association. The basho marks the return of yokozuna Terunofuji, who previously indicated that he intends to compete following injury-related absences in all or part of the last four tournaments. Sekiwake Kiribayama, the March champion, seeks a double-digit winning record in May which would likely result in promotion to the second-highest rank of ōzeki. Conversely, current ōzeki competitor Takakeishō needs eight wins in the May basho to hold on to his rank. Wakamotoharu, the older brother of injured Wakatakakage, is promoted to sekiwake for the first time in his career. It is the fourth time in sumo history that two brothers have reached the third-highest sekiwake rank, and the first since yokozuna brothers Takanohana and Wakanohana in the early 1990s. March runner-up Daieishō returns to sekiwake for the first time since last September. Former ōzeki Shōdai returns to the san'yaku ranks at komusubi after notching ten wins in March. Returning to makuuchi for the first time since 2021 is Asanoyama, the former ōzeki who has been making a comeback since serving a six-tournament suspension and had spent the first two tournaments of the year in the second-highest jūryō division. Former sekiwake Ichinojō, who was suspended in January and then won the jūryō championship in March, makes a quick return to the top division.
- 4: Former sekiwake Ichinojō submits his retirement papers, ending a career spanning over nine years with one championship and two runner-up performances in the top division. Ichinojō suffered from chronic lower back pain and reportedly sought treatment after winning his second jūryō championship in March, but his condition eventually left him unable to travel from his home to Minato stable in order to practice. Although he has acquired Japanese citizenship, Ichinojō did not acquire elder stock and will not remain in the Sumo Association as a coach.
- 9: Another violence scandal erupts as Michinoku stable is the subject of a controversy. A senior wrestler, Kirinofuji, assaulted another young wrestler, Yasunishi, in January with a frying pan and whipped him with a jump rope. Stablemaster Michinoku (former ōzeki Kirishima) is accused to have covered the violence by directly allowing the aggressor to remain within his stable and allowing him to perform a hair cutting ceremony in April despite the fact that the information was relayed to the Compliance Department. Hanakago (former sekiwake Daijuyama), the director of the Compliance Department, is also the subject of controversy for letting the aggressor retire without punishment and for declaring the incident closed after the retirement despite a formal complaint (later withdrawn) filed by the victim during the same month of April.
- 14: Takayasu withdraws on the opening day of the May 2023 tournament after suffering a right leg injury during morning practice. Although the medical certificate called for three weeks of treatment, Takayasu announced on 23 May his return for the eleventh day of the tournament.
- 19: Georgian wrestler Tochinoshin retires from professional sumo, ending a career spanning 17 years. The 35-year-old former ōzeki injured his shoulder in the January 2023 tournament and was subsequently demoted from makuuchi. At the May tournament he was unable to secure a win after competing in five jūryō matches. He concludes his career with one championship and four runner-up performances in the top division.
- 23: Kotoshōhō withdraws on Day 10 of the summer tournament after having suffered eight consecutive defeats. The reason for his absence is a patellar subluxation in his left knee. He also had sprained his right ankle during the spring jungyō. He would later re-enter the tournament on Day 14.
  Former makuuchi wrestlers and current jūryō Enhō and Chiyonokuni also withdraw from the summer tournament due to injuries. Enhō was diagnosed with a herniated disc in his neck, which will require approximately three months of treatment. Chiyonokuni is suffering from meniscus injuries in both knees and from osteoarthritis in his left knee.
- 25: Sekiwake Kiribayama secures his tenth win at the May 2023 tournament. With his 33rd victory in his last three tournaments, Kiribayama meets the requirements to be considered for promotion to the second-highest rank of ōzeki.
- 27: Yokozuna Terunofuji wins his eighth top division championship by defeating sekiwake Kiribayama and securing a two-win advantage over his competitors with one day remaining in the May 2023 tournament. It is the first time since 1989 (when the yūshō was won by yokozuna Hokutoumi–now Sumo Association president Hakkaku) that a wrestler has won the top division championship after being absent for three consecutive tournaments.
- 28: Terunofuji collects his eighth Emperor's Cup trophy after dispatching ōzeki Takakeishō in the final match to finish with a 14–1 record. Despite the loss, Takakeishō (8–7) will hold on to his ōzeki rank after securing a winning record. Finishing as the runner-up is Asanoyama (12–3) in his first top division tournament since returning from his COVID suspension. Kiribayama finishes behind him with 11 wins and his third straight Ginō-shō (Technique prize). Another Technique prize is awarded to Wakamotoharu, who wins his first special prize after finishing his first tournament at the sekiwake rank with 10 wins. The final special prize is awarded to Meisei (8–7), who after securing his first gold star is awarded the Shukun-shō (Outstanding Performance prize) for the first time.
  Following the tournament, Sumo Association chairman Hakkaku accepted the request of Refereeing Department head Sadogatake (former sekiwake Kotonowaka) to convene a special meeting on 31 May, where Kiribayama's ōzeki promotion is expected to be finalized.
  The jūryō championship is decided in a playoff, with top-ranked Gōnoyama defeating 19-year-old Ochiai to clinch his second championship in sumo. It is the first time since 15-day tournaments began in 1949 that the jūryō championship is decided in a playoff between two wrestlers with 14–1 records.
- 31: Kiribayama is officially promoted to ōzeki and makes his formal acceptance speech when notified of the Sumo Association's decision at his stable. It is also announced that Kiribayama has changed his shikona (ring name) to Kirishima, inheriting the name previously used by his stablemaster Michinoku (former ōzeki Kirishima).
  With the ranking meeting completed, the Sumo Association announces five promotions to the jūryō division for July. Included in the promotions is 26-year-old Shishi, who will become the first ever sekitori from Ukraine. Also promoted to jūryō for the first time is top makushita wrestler Kawazoe Keita, who will change his shikona to Kihō, as well as 24-year-old Yūma. Shiden returns to jūryō after he was first promoted in January 2022 but did not compete. Chiyonoumi returns to the second-highest division after 12 tournaments in makushita.

=== June ===
- 1: Former maegashira Ishiura retires, ending a 10-year career after suffering from a pinched nerve at the March 2022 tournament. The injury forced him to withdraw from competition for a year, dropping him to the rank of jonidan 60. Ishiura acquired an elder stock from his former master Chikubayama and will remain in the Sumo Association under the elder name Magaki.
  With the release of the 2025 tournament schedule, the Sumo Association announces that the annual Nagoya tournament will move from the Aichi Prefectural Gymnasium to the under-construction Aichi International Arena in July 2025.
- 3: The retirement ceremony of the 71st yokozuna Kakuryū is held at the Ryōgoku Kokugikan. Kakuryū performs his final yokozuna dohyō-iri, or ring entering ceremony, with former ōzeki Shōdai and newly promoted ōzeki Kirishima serving as the tsuyuharai (dew sweeper) and tachimochi (sword bearer), respectively. Some 380 people take turns in cutting Kakuryū's ōichōmage, including all three of the other yokozuna from Mongolia: Asashōryū, Harumafuji and Miyagino (Hakuhō).
- 4: The retirement ceremony of former sekiwake Ikioi (now Kasugayama) is held at the Ryōgoku Kokugikan.
  The retirement ceremony of former maegashira Kyokushūhō is held at the Tobu Hotel Levant in Tokyo.
- 10: The retirement ceremony of former maegashira Kagamiō is held in a reception room at the Ryōgoku Kokugikan. About 270 people took part in the hair-cutting ceremony with Kagamiyama stablemaster (former sekiwake Tagaryū) making the final cut.
- 23: The Sumo Association concludes its investigation into the allegations of assault at Michinoku stable. Stablemaster Michinoku is handed a 20% salary cut for three months and resigns his post as Operations director in the Sumo Association.
- 25: The retirement ceremony of former maegashira Yutakayama is held at the Ryōgoku Kokugikan.
- 26: The Sumo Association releases the banzuke for the July 2023 tournament in Nagoya, with newly promoted Kirishima (previously known as Kiribayama) formally listed for the first time at sumo's second-highest rank of ōzeki. Abi is promoted to komusubi for the third time in his career. Entering the top makuuchi division in his fourth career sumo tournament is Ochiai, under his new shikona Hakuōhō. Nicknamed the "Reiwa monster" in the press, the 19-year-old entered professional sumo as a makushita tsukedashi entrant in January and is the sixth-youngest competitor since 1990 to reach the top division. Hakuōhō is one of three wrestlers promoted to the top division for the first time, the others being the top-ranked jūryō wrestlers in May: Gōnoyama, who defeated then-Ochiai in the May jūryō playoff, and nine-year sumo competitor Shōnannoumi. Bushōzan returns to maegashira after competing in jūryō in May.

=== July ===
- 7: Ōzeki Takakeishō withdraws from the July tournament citing cartilage damage in both his knees requiring around 3 weeks' treatment. Knee injuries had already cost him a withdrawal from the March tournament and had plagued him at the May tournament.
- 9: The newly promoted ōzeki Kirishima sits out the first day of the July tournament because of inflammation on the back of his shoulder blade. Although his medical certificate indicates that he bruised his right ribs and would need three weeks of treatment, his stablemaster leaves open the possibility that Kirishima could return to the tournament later. This absence is a first since Musōyama at the May 2000 tournament that a newly promoted ōzeki had to withdraw on the first day of a tournament, and the fifth time in total since the start of the Shōwa era. Due to the absence of the other ōzeki, Takakeishō, the July 2023 tournament is presumed to be the first in the written history of sumo (since the Shōwa era) to be held without an ōzeki from day one. Kirishima would later compete on Day 4 of the tournament, picking up his first win at the ōzeki rank.
- 12: Yokozuna Terunofuji withdraws on Day 4 of the July tournament after conceding back-to-back gold stars to top rank-and-filers Nishikigi and Tobizaru. It is his sixth withdrawal in the last ten tournaments.
- 16: Asanoyama pulls out on Day 8 of the July tournament after partially tearing his left bicep in his loss to sekiwake Hōshōryu the day before. He returned to competition on Day 12.
- 21: Former maegashira Chiyonokuni retires, ending a 17-year career marked by repeated injuries.
- 22: Three wrestlers – Hōshōryū, Hokutofuji and newly promoted Hakuōhō – are tied for the top-division lead with eleven wins each after Day 14 of the July tournament. With the Sumo Association's Refereeing Department deciding on the Day 15 matches, Ryūden and Nishikigi – both one win behind the leaders – are eliminated from Emperor's Cup contention. Should Hokutofuji win his contest, it would result in a playoff for the championship against the winner of the match between Hōshōryū and Hakuōhō.
  Newly promoted ōzeki Kirishima suffers his sixth loss at the hands of former ōzeki Asanoyama. As he was absent for two days, Kirishima will be at kadoban status for the next tournament in September, where he will need eight wins to retain his rank.
- 23: Mongolian sekiwake Hōshōryū defeats Hokutofuji in a playoff to secure his first top-division championship, and with it a likely promotion to sumo's second-highest rank of ōzeki. The playoff match was forced when Hokutofuji defeated Nishikigi in their scheduled Day 15 contest to finish with a 12–3 record. Hōshōryū then fended off the challenge of 19-year-old Hakuōhō using an overarm throw to also finish with 12 wins. In the playoff Hokutofuji, who had already beaten Hōshōryū three days earlier, could not stop the Mongolian's advance and was pushed out of the dohyō. Hōshōryū, who could not contain his emotions after winning the playoff, secured 33 wins in his last three tournaments at the san'yaku ranks. He is poised for promotion to sumo's second-highest rank on 26 July after the request for an extraordinary board meeting of the Japan Sumo Association is granted. A total of eight special prizes are awarded at the end of the tournament. The Shukun-shō (Outstanding Performance prize) is awarded to Nishikigi (10–5), who defeated most of the wrestlers ranked above him–including yokozuna Terunofuji–and was in the hunt for the top-division championship until the final days. New makuuchi wrestler Hakuōhō (11–4) is awarded both the Kantō-shō (Fighting Spirit prize) and the Ginō-shō (Technique prize) for his efforts, becoming the first wrestler since Ichinojō in 2014 to win two special prizes in their top-division debut. The Fighting Spirit prize is also awarded to five other competitors: tournament champion Hōshōryū and runner-up Hokutofuji, Kotonowaka (11–4), and new makuuchi competitors Gōnoyama (10–5) and Shōnannoumi (10–5).
  The jūryō championship also goes to a playoff, with top-ranked Atamifuji (11–4) defeating Daiamami and likely securing a return to the top division.
- 26: The Sumo Association unanimously approves the promotion of Hōshōryū to ōzeki. He is the seventh wrestler from Mongolia to reach sumo's second-highest rank.
  It is announced that five wrestlers will be promoted to jūryō for the September tournament. There are four new promotions, two of which are from Nishonoseki stable: 23-year-old Ōnosato, a makushita tsukedashi competitor and amateur yokozuna champion who was a highly regarded prospect when he entered professional sumo earlier this year, and 24-year-old Takahashi. They are the first two recruited by their stablemaster, the 72nd yokozuna Kisenosato, to become sekitori. The other two new promotions are Miyagino stable's Mukainakano, who will take on the new shikona Tenshōhō (天照鵬) in September, and Takasago stable's Ishizaki, who will now compete under the name Asakōryū (朝紅龍). Tokihayate, who had just been demoted to makushita in July and won that division's championship, is promoted to jūryō again.
- 27: The Sumo Association announces that the Yokozuna Deliberation Council's training session for wrestlers on 2 September at the Ryōgoku Kokugikan will be open to the general public. It will be the first time since the COVID-19 pandemic that the public will be permitted to attend the session.

The summer jungyō (regional tours) were held at the following locations in July:

- 29: Toyota, Aichi
- 30: Numazu

=== August ===
- 10: Former maegashira Akiseyama retires, ending a 15-year professional sumo career. He acquires the vacant Izutsu elder stock and will remain as a coach at Kise stable.
- 28: The Sumo Association releases the banzuke for the upcoming autumn Grand Sumo Tournament in Tokyo. Three wrestlers are listed at the second-highest rank of ōzeki: Mongolian Hōshōryū will compete in his first tournament at the ōzeki rank, while Takakeishō and Kirishima both hope to secure a winning record and avoid relegation. Kotonowaka, coming off of an 11-win performance in July, earns a promotion to the third-highest rank of sekiwake for the first time. July tournament contender Nishikigi receives his first promotion to san'yaku in a career spanning 17 1/2 years. Joining Nishikigi at the rank of komusubi is Tobizaru, who returns to that rank for the first time in three tournaments. There are no newly promoted wrestlers from jūryō to Makuuchi, although two are returning to the top division. Atamifuji, the winner of the jūryō championship in July, returns after four tournaments, while Kagayaki returns after having just been demoted.

The summer jungyō (regional tours) were held at the following locations in August:

- 2: Tachikawa, Tokyo
- 3: Ryūgasaki, Ibaraki
- 4: Naraha, Fukushima
- 5: Fukushima city
- 6: Sendai
- 8: Ōshū, Iwate
- 9: Kuji, Iwate
- 12: Hakodate
- 13: Sapporo
- 14: Asahikawa
- 15: Eniwa, Hokkaido
- 19: Nagaoka, Niigata
- 20: Oyama, Tochigi
- 25: Kurobe, Toyama
- 26: Kanazawa
- 27: Himi, Toyama

=== September ===
- 2: The Yokozuna Deliberation Council's open training session is held at the Ryōgoku Kokugikan, with about 4,000 people in attendance. Following the training session, Hakkaku (the 61st yokozuna Hokutoumi) performs his kanreki dohyō-iri joined by Hokutofuji and ex-Okinoumi (now Kimigahama) as his tsuyuharai and tachimochi, respectively. Hakkaku's 60th birthday was on 22 June, but he elected to hold the kanreki dohyō-iri in September to commemorate the 30th anniversary of the founding of his stable.
- 4: Hakuōhō withdraws from the upcoming September tournament after undergoing surgery on his left shoulder on 31 August. Hakuōhō had been experiencing problems with his shoulder since the conclusion of the July tournament, and had withdrawn from the entirety of the summer regional tours. Reports suggest he may need the rest of the year to fully recover.
- 7: The Sumo Association announces the retirement of Sendagawa oyakata. The former Tōki competed in professional sumo from 1991 until 2006, and reached the fourth-highest rank of komusubi in September 2003. At the time of his retirement he was working in various departments within the Sumo Association, including as a ringside judge.
- 8: Terunofuji withdraws from the September tournament. It is his seventh kyūjō since being promoted to the yokozuna rank two years ago.
- 12: Former maegashira and makuuchi championship winner Tokushōryū retires at the age of 37, after a 14-year career. He succeeds the recently retired Tōki by using the Sendagawa name in his stable to become coach.
- 24: Ōzeki Takakeishō (11–4) defeats 21-year-old Atamifuji (11–4) in a playoff to win his fourth championship in the top division. Competing at maegashira 15, Atamifuji became one of the September tournament's headliners, holding a two-win advantage after 11 days of competition before consecutive defeats. Entering the final day with a one-win advantage, Atamifuji could have won the yūshō outright with a victory, but was defeated by former ōzeki Asanoyama (9–6). Meanwhile, four others–Takakeishō, Daieishō, Takayasu and Hokuseihō–all entered the final day just one win behind at 10–4, with up to three of them potentially facing Atamifuji in the playoff. Takakeishō, who already had enough wins to avoid demotion, defeated Daieishō (10–5) in their scheduled match by rear pushout. Takayasu (10–5) was defeated by ōzeki Kirishima (9–6), who also avoided relegation, while Hokuseihō (10–5) lost to Hōshōryū (8–7), who barely secured a winning record in his debut at sumo's second-highest rank. This set up the playoff between Takakeishō and Atamifuji, in which the 27-year-old ōzeki–who had defeated Atamifuji two days earlier–quickly stepped to the side at the tachi-ai and slapped his opponent to the ground. Takakeishō, who called Atamifuji a "young, wonderful talent," is the fourth wrestler to win the top-division championship with four losses since the six-tournament system was introduced in 1949. With the tournament results Atamifuji is the only wrestler to take home a special prize, receiving the Kantō-shō (Fighting Spirit prize).
  In the second-highest jūryō division, the winner is former top-division competitor Ichiyamamoto (13–2). The runner-up is new jūryō competitor and former amateur yokozuna Ōnosato, who earned 12 victories in his third professional tournament.
- 27: The Sumo Association holds a meeting to set the banzuke (rankings) for the next tournament in November and announces three promotions to jūryō. Newly promoted to sumo's second highest rank is Hitoshi. The 26-year-old entered sumo in 2021 after officials waived the maximum age limit for him to compete professionally. After winning the jonidan championship in his second career tournament, he was sidelined for half a year due to a neck injury. He then won three more lower-division championships–most recently the title in makushita. Two other wrestlers are promoted back to jūryō after having just been demoted: former top-division competitor Hidenoumi, who has not returned to makuuchi since his January 2022 suspension for participation in illegal gambling, and nine-year sumo competitor Yūma.
- 28: The Sumo Association announces that it will change the tsukedashi qualification system for top college and university sumo competitors. The top 8 finishers in designated tournaments will be uniformly given the lowest makushita rank, while those who finish in 9th-16th place in such tournaments will be given the lowest sandanme rank. It is also announced that two high school tournaments will be eligible for the tsukedashi system, with the top four finishers in the National High School Championship and the National Athletic Meet for high school boys offered the lowest sandanme rank. With this, the current qualifications for makushita tsukedashi 10–a system that has promoted only Kiyoseumi, Endō, Mitakeumi and Ōnosato since its introduction in 2001–and makushita tsukedashi 15–a promotion system whose four latest beneficiaries are Ōshōma, Kihō, Hakuōhō and Ōnokatsu–will be abolished.
  Additionally, the Sumo Association announces changes regarding the height and weight requirements for new sumo recruits. Under the new standards, prospective recruits that do not meet the minimums of 167 cm (5 ft 6 in) and 67 kg (148 lb) can still qualify to enter professional sumo by passing a physical fitness exam.
  Promotions are announced for gyōji (sumo referees) effective 25 December, the date that the January 2024 banzuke will be published. The current 41st Shikimori Inosuke, Hideki Imaoka, will be promoted to become the 38th Kimura Shōnosuke, marking the first time in 8 1/2 years that the upper of the two tate-gyōji ranks will be used. Imaoka is expected to hold his new title until September 2024, when he reaches sumo's mandatory retirement age of 65. Also, the current Kimura Hisanosuke, Toshikazu Hata, will be promoted to the san'yaku-gyōji rank. At the same time, promotions for yobidashi (ushers) are also announced. Jirō (Kasugano stable) becomes, by jumping two ranks, the first tate-yobidashi (chief yobidashi) promoted since October 2019. Katsuyuki (Shibatayama stable) is promoted to the second rank of the hierarchy by becoming fuku-tate-yobidashi (deputy chief).
- 29: The 6th Kimura Tamajirō, Masashi Takeda, submits his retirement papers to the Sumo Association ending a 47-year career. The 62-year-old, who was ranked just below the current Shikimori Inosuke, was not included in the list of promoted gyōji announced the day before.
- 30: The danpatsu-shiki (retirement ceremony) of Okinoumi is held at the Ryōgoku Kokugikan.

=== October ===
- 1: The danpatsu-shiki (retirement ceremony) of Kaisei is held before invited guests at the Ryōgoku Kokugikan.
- 2: Ōzeki Kirishima wins the annual All Japan Rikishi Tournament, a one-day single-elimination tournament held at the Ryōgoku Kokugikan.
- 24: Kokonoe (former ōzeki Chiyotakai) is suspended for an undetermined amount of time after an underage makushita wrestler from his stable got drunk earlier in the month during the autumn regional tour. The wrestler in question is also suspended, and those involved in the drinking spree are expelled from the tour along with Kokonoe. A second wrestler from the stable is suspended the following day. Two days after the initial suspensions were announced, the Sumo Association sends warnings to all stables and calls for thorough measures to prevent drinking and smoking by those under the legal age of 20.
- 30: The Sumo Association releases the banzuke for the November 2023 tournament in Fukuoka. There are no changes to the top three ranks of yokozuna, ōzeki and sekiwake. Two wrestlers are promoted again to the fourth-highest rank of komusubi: Abi, who had just been demoted from that rank in September, and Hokutofuji, who returns to the san'yaku ranks for the first time since March 2020. For the first time in 10 years there are four new promotions from jūryō to makuuchi. 2018 All Japan Student Sumo champion Tōhakuryū is the first makuuchi competitor from Tamanoi stable since 2013. With three lower-division championships, Churanoumi becomes the fifth top-division competitor from Okinawa Prefecture in the post-war era. Rōga, who won consecutive jonokuchi and jonidan championships in 2019, becomes the sixth makuuchi competitor from Russia and the first for stablemaster Futagoyama (former ōzeki Miyabiyama). Kitanowaka, whose 23rd birthday will fall on the first day of the November tournament, is Hakkaku stable's first top-division promotion in seven years. Additionally, two others return to the makuuchi ranks: Ichiyamamoto, who spent the last two tournaments in jūryō and had just won the September championship in that division, and Tomokaze, who competed in five tournaments in 2019 at the top division before a knee injury and subsequent recovery resulted in his demotion to jonidan.
  The unveiling of the banzuke is also an occasion for change in the sumo world. Kasugano stable ends its 56-year continuous presence of one of its wrestlers in the makuuchi division with the demotion of Bulgarian Aoiyama to the jūryō division. Saitama Prefecture also becomes the second prefecture in sumo history, after Aomori, to have three native wrestlers ranked in the san'yaku ranks with Daieishō, Abi and Hokutofuji.

The autumn jungyō (regional tours) were held at the following locations:

- 4: Ōta, Tokyo
- 6: Matsumoto, Nagano
- 7: Kōfu, Yamanashi
- 9: Isehara, Kanagawa
- 11: Chichibu, Saitama
- 12: Yaizu, Shizuoka
- 13: Nishio, Aichi
- 14: Kasugai, Aichi
- 15: Ōbu, Aichi
- 17: Tajimi, Gifu
- 18: Ōtsu, Shiga
- 19: Kyoto
- 20: Sakurai, Nara
- 21: Wakayama
- 22: Takamatsu
- 23: Tokushima
- 24: Kōchi
- 25: Okayama
- 26: Izumo, Shimane
- 27: Maniwa, Okayama
- 28: Hiroshima
- 29: Kadoma, Osaka

=== November ===
- 9: Terunofuji withdraws from the upcoming November tournament, marking his eighth absence since being promoted to the rank of yokozuna. He finishes 2023 having fully competed in just one of the year's six grand sumo tournaments–the May tournament, which he won.
- 10: Former ōzeki and current top rank-and-filer Asanoyama announces he will sit out the start of the November tournament due to slow recovery of his left calf muscle, which had been torn last month during the regional tours. Asanoyama would eventually enter the tournament on Day 8, defeating ōzeki Takakeishō in his first match.
- 21: Maegashira Kotoekō withdraws on Day 10 of the November tournament due to an injury to his left MCL, ending his streak of 1,043 consecutive sumo matches since beginning his career in 2007.
- 22: Maegashira and former sekiwake Takanoshō pulls out on Day 11 of the November tournament after appearing to suffer an injury to his right knee in his Day 10 match against Myōgiryū. His medical certificate reported a damaged right meniscus and ACL.
- 26: Mongolian ōzeki Kirishima (13–2) wins his second career top-division championship at the November 2023 sumo tournament in Fukuoka. Kirishima and Atamifuji opened up a two-win advantage on their competitors after 12 days, the latter being one of the tournament's main yūshō challengers for the second straight time. Kirishima defeated Atamifuji in their Day 14 contest, and officially locked up his second makuuchi title when Atamifuji lost his scheduled Day 15 bout to sekiwake Kotonowaka. In the final bout of the tournament, Kirishima beat fellow ōzeki Takakeishō. While September champion Takakeishō failed in his bid for yokozuna promotion with a 9–6 record, Kirishima will now seek ascension to sumo's highest rank at the next tournament in January. The Sumo Association hands out three Kantō-shō (Fighting Spirit) special prizes to the three runner-ups, all finishing at 11–4: Atamifuji, Kotonowaka and Ichiyamamoto. Despite sitting out the beginning of the July tournament, Kirishima finishes 2023 with 62 victories, the most in the top division.
  The championship in the jūryō division goes to former maegashira Kotoshōhō (12–3), who defeats 23-year-old tsukedashi entrant Ōnosato (12–3) in a playoff. With his third title in the second-highest division, Kotoshōhō–the top-ranked jūryō competitor–appears likely to return to the top division in January.
- 27: Yokozuna Terunofuji–who competed in just one full tournament in 2023–is requested by the Yokozuna Deliberation Council to compete at the next tournament in January. The council indicated that they would make a comment should Terunofuji not compete, which could including issuing a formal notice.
- 29: The Sumo Association holds its ranking meeting and announces four promotions from makushita to jūryō for January. Two wrestlers reach sekitori status for the very first time. 24-year-old Takerufuji is from Aomori and is a graduate of Tottori Jōhoku High School and Nihon University, with two lower-division championships since starting sumo at the end of last year; to date he has won 43 of his 49 professional matches. 22-year-old Ishikawa native Ōshōumi also has two lower-division championships, registering winning records in all tournaments since returning from a shoulder ligament injury in July 2022. 12-year sumo veteran Hakuyōzan returns to the second-highest division after just having been demoted to makushita, while Tochimusashi returns for the first time in five tournaments.

=== December ===
- 18: One day after the death of former sekiwake Terao, coach Tatsutagawa (former komusubi Hōmashō) announces his intention to inherit the Shikoroyama toshiyori and stable. On 28 December, the Sumo Association announced that Tatsutagawa became acting master of the stable in charge of managing and supervising wrestlers.
- 25: The Sumo Association releases the official rankings for the January 2024 tournament. The san'yaku ranks see the promotion of Ura, who reaches a career best with his elevation to komusubi. Joining Ura at sumo's fourth-highest rank is veteran and former ōzeki Takayasu, who returns to san'yaku for the first time since last January's tournament. September and November top division runner-up Atamifuji is promoted to a personal best for his recent efforts, reaching the top of the maegashira ladder. Two wrestlers are promoted to the makuuchi division for the first time: 23-year-old Ōnosato, who becomes the first top-division competitor for Nishonoseki stable under the 72nd yokozuna Kisenosato, and 27-year-old Shimazuumi, the first makuuchi wrestler for Hanaregoma stable since being taken over by former sekiwake Tamanoshima. Three wrestlers return to the top division: Kotoshōhō, who had just been demoted in November and won the championship in jūryō, Bushōzan, who returns after three tournaments, and former sekiwake Aoiyama, who won 8 matches at the top jūryō rank in November.
  On the same day 36-year-old Mongolian Azumaryū, having just been demoted out of sekitori status, retires from professional sumo. The former maegashira's retirement ends a 15-year career in which he spent 11 tournaments in the top division.
- 27: The Sumo Association approves the 71st yokozuna Kakuryū's acquisition of the Otowayama elder stock previously held by former maegashira Tenkaihō. The former Kakuryū will branch off from Michinoku stable to form his own stable, Otowayama stable. It is also announced that two coaches in Sakaigawa stable will swap elder stock, with former maegashira Hōchiyama becoming Dekiyama-oyakata and former maegashira Sadanofuji becoming Furiwake-oyakata.

The winter jungyō (regional tours) were held at the following locations:

- 3: Yatsushiro, Kumamoto
- 4: Kikuyō, Kumamoto
- 5: Miyazaki
- 6: Ōita
- 8: Kasuga, Fukuoka
- 9: Sasebo, Nagasaki
- 10: Ōmura, Nagasaki
- 12: Matsuyama, Ehime
- 15: Higashihiroshima, Hiroshima
- 16: Fukuyama, Hiroshima
- 17: Sakai, Osaka
- 19: Habikino, Osaka
- 20: Amagasaki, Hyōgo
- 24: Tochigi

== Deaths ==
- 2 April: Former maegashira Asaarashi, aged 79, of a heart attack.
- 22 June: Sōkichi Kumagai, the 27th Kimura Shōnosuke (tate-gyōji), aged 97, of natural causes.
- 2 November: Former ōzeki Asashio IV, aged 67, of small intestine cancer.
- 17 December: Former sekiwake Terao, aged 60, of arrhythmia.

== See also ==
- Glossary of sumo terms
- List of active sumo wrestlers
- List of years in sumo
