= Kotoshōhō Yoshinari =

Japanese sumo wrestler (born 1999)

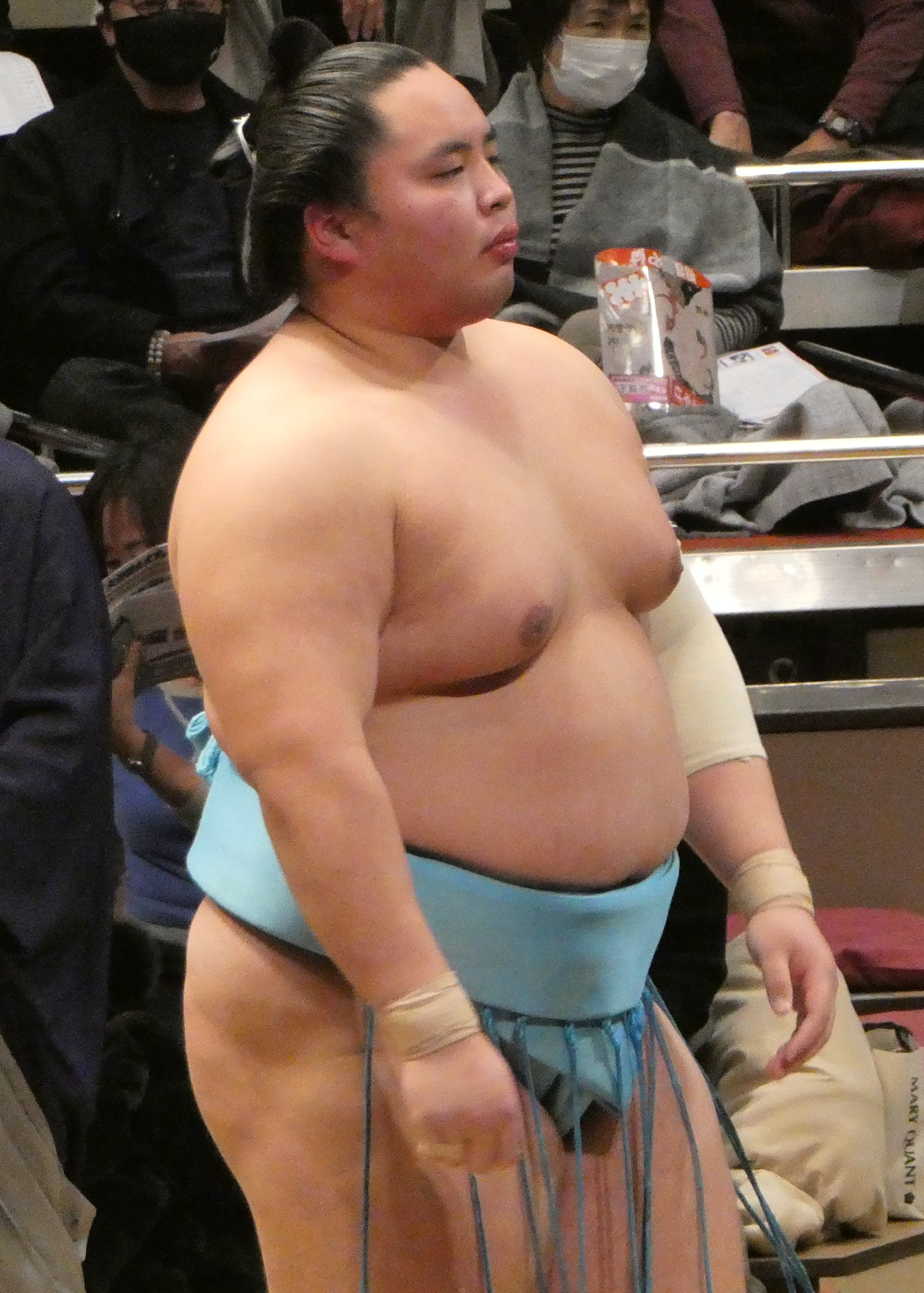
- Kotoshōhō in 2022

Personal information
- Native name: 琴勝峰 吉成
- Born: Toshiki Tebakari; August 26, 1999 (age 27) Kashiwa, Chiba, Japan
- Height: 1.91 m (6 ft 3 in)
- Weight: 172 kg (379 lb; 27.1 st)

Sport
- Sport: Sumo
- Rank: see below
- Heya: Sadogatake
- Debut: November 2017
- Highest rank: Sekiwake (May 2026)
- Championships: 1 (Makuuchi); 3 (Jūryō)
- Special Prizes: 3 (Fighting Spirit); 1 (Outstanding Performance)
- Gold Stars: 1 (Ōnosato)
- Updated on April 27, 2026

Kotoshōhō Yoshinari (Japanese: 琴勝峰 吉成; born August 26, 1999 as Toshiki Tebakari (手計 富士紀, Tebakari Toshiki)) is a Japanese professional sumo wrestler from Kashiwa, Chiba. He made his debut in November 2017 and reached the top makuuchi division in May 2020. He wrestles for Sadogatake stable. His highest rank has been sekiwake.

In the July 2025 tournament, he went on an unbeaten run from Day 6 to win his first top-division championship 13–2, also winning the Fighting Spirit and Outstanding Performance awards. He was a runner-up in the January 2023 tournament, as well as the March 2026 tournament.

== Career ==
He began sumo in the first grade of elementary school, and won the national junior high school championship in his third year of junior high. He went to Saitama Sakae High School, famous for its sumo program, and was classmates with Naya and Tsukahara. After graduating from high school he joined Sadogatake stable, recruited by ex-sekiwake Kotonowaka, to whom he had a connection as Kotonowaka's eldest son was a fellow member of Kashiwa City's boys sumo club. He made his professional debut in November 2017, using the shikona of Kototebakari Toshiki (琴手計 富士紀), based on his own name. In his first tournament on the banzuke in January 2018 he took part in a playoff with Tsukahara for the jonokuchi division championship after both finished with a 6–1 record. He reached the makushita division in September 2018 and although he was unable to secure a winning record he returned to makushita in January 2019 and five straight winning records saw him reach elite sekitori status after the September 2019 tournament. To mark the occasion he changed his shikona to Kotoshōhō Yoshinari.

Kotoshōhō won the jūryō division yūshō or championship with a 12–3 record in March 2020, only his third tournament in the division, and this earned him promotion to the top division for the Natsu tournament scheduled for May 2020. He has been praised by commentators for his calm demeanour and his maturity in the dohyō despite being only 20 years of age at the time of his promotion. Three further winning records brought him to the joi-jin rank of maegashira 3 for the January 2021 tournament, where he managed only two wins facing top-ranked opposition. He missed several days of the March 2021 tournament due to injury, only managing to record one win, and he was demoted back to jūryō for the May 2021 tournament. He won his second jūryō division championship in January 2022 with an 11–4 record, and returned to the top division for the March 2022 tournament.

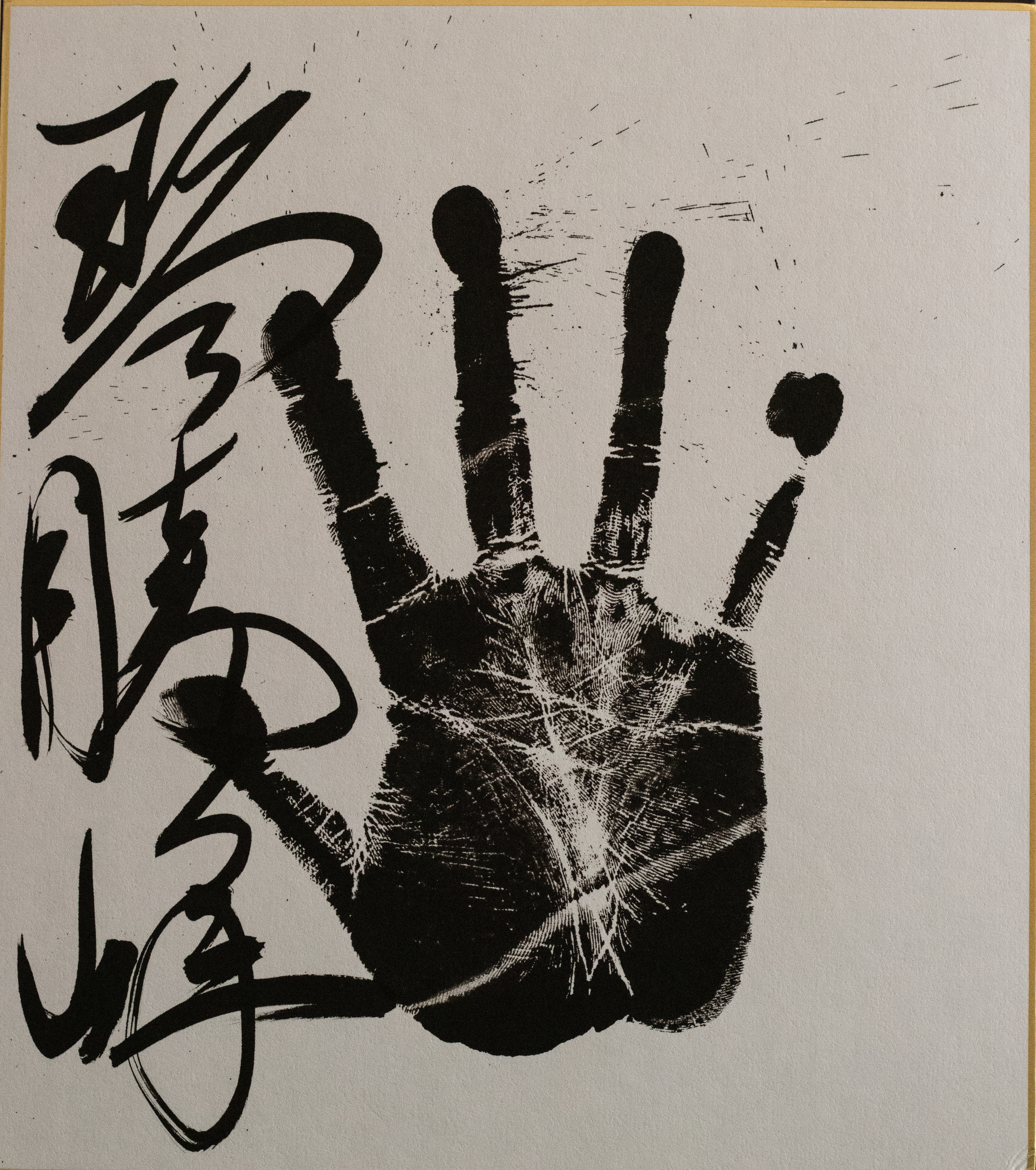
A Kotoshoho tegata (handprint & signature)

He secured a winning record of 9–6 there, but then had losing records in the next four tournaments. From the rank of maegashira 13 in January 2023, he entered the final day level with ōzeki Takakeishō on 11–3, and fought him for the championship in the final match of the tournament, the first maegashira to be in such a position since 15-day tournaments were established in 1949. Although he was defeated and missed out on the Outstanding Performance award, he did receive the Fighting Spirit award for his 11–4 performance, the best of his career. Kotoshōhō withdrew on Day 10 of the May 2023 tournament due to a patellar subluxation in his left knee, after having suffered eight consecutive defeats. He also had sprained his right ankle during the spring jungyō. He nevertheless expressed his desire to return to the competition and was later scheduled to return on Day fourteen.

Kotoshōhō was demoted to the jūryō division after suffering ten losses at the rank of maegashira 14 in September 2023. He won the November 2023 jūryō title–his third career title in that division–with ten wins and a playoff victory over 2023 tsukedashi entrant Ōnosato. As the top-ranked jūryō competitor at the time, Kotoshōhō appeared likely to return to the top division for the next tournament in January 2024.

Kotoshōhō spent 2024 competing in the maegashira ranks, securing winning records in his first four tournaments before suffering eight losses in September. In November he won three matches before pulling out near the end of the tournament, with his medical certificate indicating a toe dislocation and avulsion fracture requiring two months of treatment.

Kotoshōhō sat out the first five days of the May 2025 tournament, with his stablemaster Sadogatake announcing that Kotoshōhō injured his right bicep during the Yokozuna Deliberation Council training session earlier in the month.

=== First makuuchi championship and san'yaku ===
At the following tournament in July 2025, Kotoshōhō maintained an undefeated run from day 6 of the tournament onwards, and defeated the newly promoted yokozuna Ōnosato to earn his first career kinboshi. He continued to be in contention for the title, and emerged as the sole leader entering the tournament's final day over fellow maegashira competitors Aonishiki and Kusano. He then defeated Aonishiki on the final day, winning his first top division yūshō with a record of 13–2, and claimed the Outstanding Performance and Fighting Spirit special prizes. He also became the first sumo wrestler to win the Emperor's Cup at the Aichi International Arena, which replaced the Aichi Prefectural Gymnasium that year as the host of Nagoya's annual grand sumo tournament.

The day after his victory, Kotoshōhō said that the realization of winning his first championship in the top division was still sinking in. He told reporters that he was able to concentrate more during the second half of the tournament. He said he used the lessons he learned from the January 2023 tournament, where he was in contention for the makuuchi title before losing to Takakeishō on the final day. Regarding the following tournament, he said his approach would not change, saying: "I want to do what I need to do without getting carried away."

After winning the championship, Kotoshōhō went on to deliver a string of mediocre and average performances until the March 2026 tournament, where he recorded 11 wins and earned the Fighting Spirit prize, propelling him to the rank of sekiwake for the May tournament. Having achieved this rank in 35 tournaments since his debut in the makuuchi division in 2020, Kotoshōhō is the 10th slowest wrestler to attain sekiwake status since debuting in the top division in sumo history.

Kotoshōhō had to withdraw from the September 2026 tournament after suffering a concussion during his eleventh match against Churanoumi. Commenting on his absence, Sadogatake (the former Kotonowaka) assured everyone that Kotoshōhō had no memory of the match but had not sustained any further injuries, adding that he should now focus on his recovery.

== Fighting style ==
According to his Japan Sumo Association profile, Kotoshoho prefers a migi-yotsu (left hand outside, right hand inside grip on his opponent's mawashi and his most common winning kimarite are yori-kiri (force out) and oshi dashi (push out).

== Personal life ==
Kotoshōhō has a younger brother who also wrestles as a professional in the same stable under the ring name Kotoeihō. Both brothers previously used the shikona Kototebakari, inspired by their surname.

In June 2023, Kotoshōhō held a press conference at Ryōgoku Kokugikan to announce his engagement to a woman of the same age, living in Yame, Fukuoka Prefecture, to whom he proposed after the May 2023 tournament. The following month it was announced that the couple were expecting their first child. Their son was born on 24 October 2023, and the wedding ceremony took place on 9 June 2024.

== Career record ==
Kotoshōhō Yoshinari
Year	January Hatsu basho, Tokyo	March Haru basho, Osaka	May Natsu basho, Tokyo	July Nagoya basho, Nagoya	September Aki basho, Tokyo	November Kyūshū basho, Fukuoka
2017	x	x	x	x	x	(Maezumō)
2018	East Jonokuchi #19; 6–1–P	East Jonidan #42; 6–1	West Sandanme #77; 5–2	East Sandanme #47; 6–1	West Makushita #58; 3–4	East Sandanme #10; 5–2
2019	West Makushita #48; 6–1	West Makushita #20; 4–3	East Makushita #15; 5–2	East Makushita #8; 4–3	West Makushita #4; 4–3	East Jūryō #13; 9–6
2020	West Jūryō #8; 9–6	East Jūryō #6; 12–3; Champion	East Maegashira #15; Tournament Cancelled; State of Emergency; 0–0–0	East Maegashira #15; 8–7	East Maegashira #12; 10–5	West Maegashira #5; 8–7
2021	East Maegashira #3; 2–13	West Maegashira #11; 1–6–8	East Jūryō #5; 7–8	West Jūryō #5; 5–10	West Jūryō #8; 9–6	East Jūryō #6; 8–7
2022	West Jūryō #2; 11–4; Champion	East Maegashira #14; 9–6	East Maegashira #9; 6–9	East Maegashira #11; 5–6–4	East Maegashira #11; 7–8	West Maegashira #11; 7–8
2023	East Maegashira #13; 11–4; F	East Maegashira #5; 6–9	West Maegashira #5; 2–10–3	West Maegashira #13; 7–8	West Maegashira #14; 5–10	West Jūryō #1; 12–3; Champion
2024	East Maegashira #14; 9–6	West Maegashira #9; 8–7	West Maegashira #8; 8–7	East Maegashira #7; 8–7	West Maegashira #4; 7–8	West Maegashira #5; 3–11–1
2025	West Maegashira #13; 5–10	West Maegashira #16; 8–7	East Maegashira #14; 6–4–5	East Maegashira #15; 13–2; FO★	East Maegashira #5; 3–12	West Maegashira #10; 7–8
2026	West Maegashira #10; 9–6	West Maegashira #5; 11–4; F	West Sekiwake #1; 9–6	West Sekiwake #1; 6–9	East Maegashira #1; 5–7–3	East Maegashira #6; 8–7
Record given as wins–losses–absences Top division champion Top division runner-up Retired Non-participation Jūryō Lower divisions Sanshō key: F=Fighting spirit; O=Outstanding performance; T=Technique Also shown: ★=Kinboshi; P=Playoff(s); Divisions: Makuuchi — Jūryō — Makushita — Sandanme — Jonidan — Jonokuchi Makuuchi ranks: Yokozuna — Ōzeki — Sekiwake — Komusubi — Maegashira

== See also ==
- Glossary of sumo terms
- List of active sumo wrestlers
- List of non-Japanese sumo wrestlers
- List of active gold star earners
- List of active special prize winners
- List of sumo top division champions
- List of sumo top division runners-up
- List of sumo second division champions
- List of sekiwake
