= Hakunofuji Tetsuya =

Japanese sumo wrestler

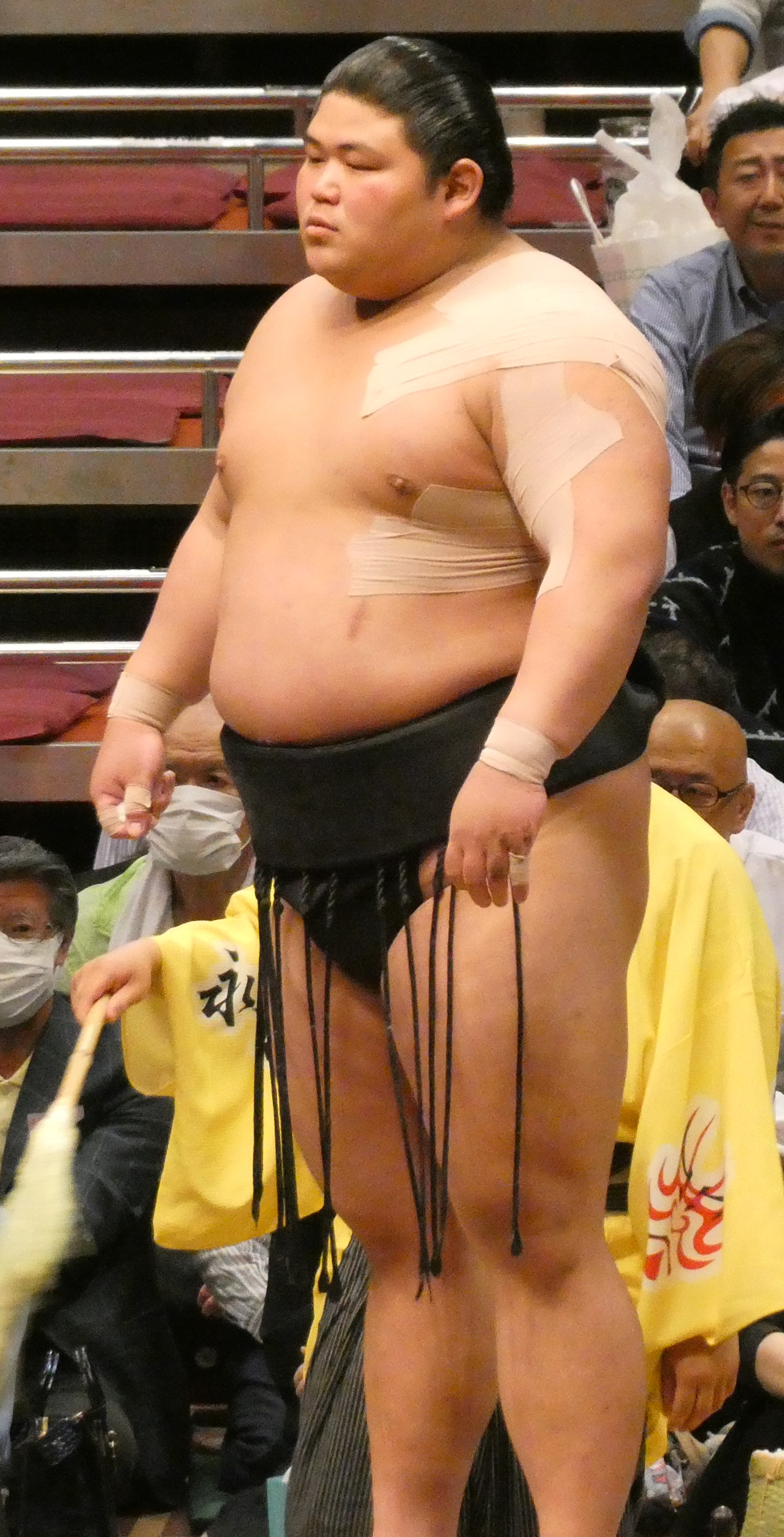
- Hakunofuji in May 2023

Personal information
- Native name: 伯乃富士 哲也
- Born: Tetsuya Ochiai; August 22, 2003 (age 23) Kurayoshi, Tottori, Japan
- Height: 1.81 m (5 ft 11 1/2 in)
- Weight: 159 kg (351 lb; 25.0 st)

Sport
- Sport: Sumo
- Rank: see below
- Heya: Miyagino → Isegahama
- Debut: January 2023
- Highest rank: Komusubi (September 2026)
- Championships: Makushita (1)
- Special Prizes: Fighting Sprit (2); Technique (1); Outstanding Performance (1)
- Gold Stars: 6 Ōnosato (3); Hōshōryū (3)
- Updated on November 15, 2026

Hakunofuji Tetsuya (Japanese: 伯乃富士 哲也; born Tetsuya Ochiai (落合 哲也, Ochiai Tetsuya) on August 22, 2003) is a Japanese professional sumo wrestler from Kurayoshi, Tottori. After a successful amateur career, he turned professional in January 2023, via makushita tsukedashi system, winning that division's championship and being promoted to sumo's top division in July 2023. Nicknamed "Reiwa monster" thanks to his record-breaking promotions, his highest rank has been komusubi. A former member of Miyagino stable under the guidance of former yokozuna Hakuhō, he currently wrestles for Isegahama stable. He has six kinboshi, or gold star, for defeating a yokozuna-ranked opponent as a maegashira.

== Early life and sumo background ==
As a kid, Ochiai played football from the first grade to the fourth grade. Because of his physique and poor playing habits, he was nevertheless advised to quit the sport. While in second grade at Seitoku Elementary School in Kurayoshi, the same school as former yokozuna Kotozakura, he took part in the "Sakura-zumo" children's tournament and decided to take up the sport when he won the individual competition as a fourth grader. It was only during that time he began to wrestle regularly. He entered Tottori Nishi Junior High School, the sister school of Tottori Jōhoku High School, but had to hang in there, calling his father at the end of his first sumo training session to throw in the towel, the rigors of training being too much for him. Encouraged by Ichinojō, who was Jōhoku High's club captain, he nevertheless kept at it and during the junior high school national championships in his second year, he defeated the reigning champion, citing this moment as the one that made him love sumo. In ninth grade, he won the Hakuhō Cup junior high school tournament. However, it was also during these years that he injured his shoulder, a condition that has not yet fully healed. He then entered Tottori Jōhoku High School and won the title of high school yokozuna in his second and third year of high school competition; in his third year, he was in the top eight at the All-Japan Championships and thus was eligible for sandanme tsukedashi. After graduating from high school, he focused on healing his shoulder injury and worked at his father's metalwork machinery company Noda Gumi in Tottori. By virtue of winning the All Japan Corporate Sumo Championship in September 2022 (and thus being named Corporate Yokozuna) he was eligible to enter professional sumo as makushita tsukedashi'.

== Early career ==
=== Recruitment and historical promotion ===
At the invitation of Miyagino oyakata (the 69th yokozuna Hakuhō), Ochiai joined the Miyagino stable. He made his professional debut in January 2023 at the rank of makushita 15 to reflect his amateur success (makushita tsukedashi). He won the makushita title with an undefeated record of seven wins and was subsequently promoted to the jūryō division for March, becoming the first wrestler to earn a jūryō promotion after just one tournament in 90 years. Since the abolition of the makushita tsukedachi system for promotion to the top of the makushita division in September 2023, Ochiai is likely to be the last wrestler to be promoted to the jūryō division in just one tournament in sumo's modern history. Given Ochiai's quick rise to the second-highest division, Miyagino confessed he hadn't had the time to think of a shikona for his apprentice. Thanks to his record-breaking promotion, Ochiai began to be nicknamed Reiwa no kaibutsu (令和の怪物), meaning 'Reiwa monster', in reference to ōzeki Musōyama who was nicknamed 'Heisei monster' after he too was promoted to jūryō after being undefeated as a makushita.

=== Jūryō career ===
Ochiai experienced his first defeat in professional sumo on day 2 of the Osaka tournament (in March 2023) against the other newly promoted jūryō, Tamashōhō. On the 6th day of the same tournament, he announced that he had made the unusual decision to become the tsukebito of makuuchi wrestler Hokuseihō because he wanted to experience this role himself and considered it a learning experience. He finished the March 2023 tournament with 10–5 record.

Ochiai was promoted to jūryō 8 in the May 2023 tournament. He finished the tournament with 14 wins along with Gōnoyama, who defeated Ochiai on Day 11. The two wrestlers were thus competing for the jūryō championship and Ochiai would have been the first wrestler under the age of 20 to win the title since his master Hakuhō's victory at the 2004 tournament. Ochiai was however beaten again by Gōnoyama in the jūryō championship playoff. It marked the first time since 1949 that the jūryō championship was decided in a playoff between two wrestlers with 14–1 records.

After the May 2023 tournament it was announced that Ochiai received the shikona Hakuōhō (伯桜鵬) from his stablemaster. The ring name is a combination of "Haku" (伯), referring to the province of Hōki (伯耆国) which became Tottori Prefecture, "Ō" (桜) from "Sakura-zumo" (桜ずもう), a sumo tournament in Kurayoshi in which he participated when he was a schoolboy and finally "Hō" (鵬) to refer to Ochiai's master, Hakuhō.

== Makuuchi ==
=== Top division promotion ===
On 26 June 2023, Hakuōhō's name appeared on the July 2023 sumo tournament rankings at the position of west maegashira 17, ushering his entry into sumo's top division in just his fourth professional tournament. Hakuōhō is the sixth-youngest wrestler since 1990 to reach the top division, doing so at the age of 19 years and 10 months, as well as the second wrestler since the Shōwa era to reach makuuchi in three tournaments since their debut (the other being Endō). Upon his promotion, Hakuōhō told reporters that his goal for his first top division tournament was 12 wins and the Shukun-shō (Outstanding Performance prize), which his stablemaster Miyagino achieved in his first makuuchi appearance in May 2004. Hakuōhō said that he hadn't gotten used to his new name yet, but said that it felt fresh. He said he was satisfied with his performances in his first three tournaments, but that from now on it would not be so easy.

Hakuōhō began his tournament with a win over Aoiyama, and went on to win the majority of his matches although he also lost to former san'yaku Takarafuji (on Day 3) and Ryūden (Day 5). On Day 6, he overcame Gōnoyama, who had beaten him twice for the jūryō division title in the previous tournament; defeating him by hatakikomi and bringing his 5-match winning streak to a halt. In September 2023, Hakuōhō revealed to the press that during the tournament his shoulder would dislocate after days of fighting, having dislocated a total of three times during the duration of the tournament. Wishing to continue to wrestle to satisfy the expectations of those around him and the public, Hakuōhō reached a positive kachi-koshi record on Day 11, with a victory over the former ōzeki Takayasu. He then went on to defeat komusubi Abi the following day. This victory marked the first time a newly-promoted makuuchi had won a match against a wrestler currently in san'yaku since Ichinojō defeated then-ōzeki Kisenosato at the September 2014 tournament. Hakuōhō then went on to achieve back-to-back victories on Day 13 and 14 over tournament leaders maegashira Nishikigi and Hokutofuji, strengthening his own chances of claiming the makuuchi championship. At the end of the tournament, Hakuōhō faced Hōshōryū, both recording 11 wins to 3 losses. The winner of this match would have to challenge Hokutofuji, who, with 12 wins and 3 losses had secured a place in a playoff for the makuuchi championship. Hōshōryū nevertheless defeated Hakuōhō by uwatenage, effectively eliminating Hakuōhō from the title race. On the fifteenth day of the tournament Hakuōhō was however announced as the recipient of the sanshō awards for Technique and Fighting Spirit. These prizes, awarded in just four tournaments, make Hakuōhō the fastest prize winner in sumo history, breaking the records set by former sekiwake Ichinojō and former ōzeki Miyabiyama, who had won the awards in five tournaments since their professional debuts.

=== Injury and demotion ===
A few days after end of the July tournament, it was announced that Hakuōhō would withdraw from the summer regional tours because of left shoulder pain. On 29 August, one day after the September banzuke was released, he told reporters that he was not in very good condition. At the time he did not rule out the possibility of withdrawing from the September tournament, saying that even if he did and subsequently dropped in the rankings, his goal was not to be in makuuchi but to pursue his dream and do his best. On September 4, it was confirmed that Hakuōhō would indeed be absent for the September tournament. His master Miyagino had already raised the possibility of an absence on August 27 due to a possible operation to treat pain caused by a subluxation of the left shoulder, an old injury of Hakuōhō's. The operation in question finally took place on August 31, forcing Hakuōhō into a period of remission that could last until the end of the year to achieve complete recovery. After his first away tournament, he confided to Yahoo! Sports his frustration at not being able to take part when the others promoted at the same time as him to makuuchi (Shōnannoumi, Gōnoyama and Atamifuji) were able to participate and performed quite well.

Hakuōhō was demoted on the November 2023 banzuke to the jūryō division. Shortly after the rankings were released, it was announced that Hakuōhō would withdraw from that tournament to continue rehabilitation. Stablemaster Miyagino said that the objective was for Hakuōhō to compete in the January 2024 tournament. Five days before the start of the January 2024 tournament, Hakuōhō—demoted to the rank of makushita 5—was medically cleared to compete. Miyagino decided to wait a few more days before giving Hakuōhō permission to enter the tournament.

=== Return to competition ===
Hakuōhō was still unsure whether he would be able to compete in the January 2024 tournament, but confided afterwards that despite his master's cautious advice he decided to take part to gamble on his chances of once again being promoted to jūryō in one tournament, having been relegated to the top of the makushita division. Having resumed competition, he suffered defeat on his third match to Ōnomatsu stable's Ōnokatsu, the last wrestler to turn professional using the status of makushita tsukedachi 15 before the system was abolished in September 2023. He later cited this match as his highlight of the tournament, having lost even though he felt his performance was the best of his seven matches. Despite this defeat, Hakuōhō recorded, on the ninth day of competition, a kachi-koshi record by beating Kototebakari (younger brother of Kotoshōhō) by shitatenage. Hakuōhō continued to improve his score, ending the tournament with a score of 6–1, his last victory coming when he defeated upper-division and former makuuchi-ranked wrestler Chiyomaru on Day 13. After the tournament, he commented that he was not at all satisfied with his performance and that his results had been down to luck. Later in January, it was announced that Hakuōhō's score would be enough to promote him back into the jūryō division for the March tournament.

Hakuōhō began his return to sekitori status in the spotlight after the abuse case and the retirement of his senior stablemate Hokuseihō, making him the most senior wrestler in Miyagino stable at the time. In his first match, in which he appeared with a chonmage for the first time, he defeated Kitaharima, his senior by 17 years. Hakuōhō ended the tournament with a barely-reached kachi-koshi refusing, however, to attribute his score to the atmosphere surrounding the possible forthcoming closure of his stable. In the last week of March, it was confirmed that Hakuōhō and all the wrestlers and coaches from Miyagino stable would be transferred to Isegahama stable for an indefinite period of time.

On the second day of the May 2024 tournament, Hakuōhō suffered a torn right biceps in his match against Tamashōhō. He took the decision to continue competing, nonetheless suffering defeat against Chiyosakae on Day 3. On the eighth day he declared himself absent from the tournament due to a COVID-19 infection, the medical report prescribing five days' rest. Steadily, Hakuōhō regained the top division for the 2025 January tournament, after a period in which it was noted that, although he had lost his momentum, he had continued to demonstrate good faith without ever really reviving his "Reiwa monster" nickname he had earned after some standout performances.

During the 2025 May tournament, Hakuōhō performed well during the first part of the tournament by winning seven consecutive matches, qualifying him among the leading wrestlers for the championship with yokozuna title-seeker Ōnosato. His winning streak came to an end on Day 8, however, when he conceded defeat to Meisei, now chasing the tournament leader in a group with Aonishiki and Wakatakakage. On the tenth day, he suffered a second defeat in his match against Daieishō, falling in his pursuit of the tournament leader. Hakuōhō ended the tournament with a run of six consecutive losses starting on Day 10, ending his tournament with a barely achieved kachi-koshi score.

Following the final retirement of his former master Miyagino (the 69th yokozuna Hakuhō) in June 2025, Hakuōhō and the other members of the former Miyagino stable were instructed to remain under the tutelage of Isegahama stable. When questioned by the press, he refused to comment on his master's decision.

On the eighth day of the July 2025 tournament in Nagoya, Hakuōhō notched his first career kinboshi by defeating yokozuna Ōnosato. In the next tournament, in September, he repeated the feat on the fourth day. Since he also achieved a positive score during that last tournament, he was awarded the Outstanding Performance prize, the first of his career.

Hakuōhō kicked off the November 2025 tournament by defeating yokozuna Hōshōryū for his third career gold star.

Beginning with the January 2026 tournament, Hakuōhō changed his name to Hakunofuji (伯乃富士). At the time of the rankings release he was one of nine wrestlers in Isegahama stable, and one of eight formerly associated with Miyagino stable, to change their names and adopt the suffix fuji (富士) related to the shikona of his current stable master, the former Terunofuji. During the first tournament under his new name, Hakunofuji defeated Ōnosato for his fourth kinboshi. This made him the third wrestler after Tosanoumi and Hokutofuji to collect at least one gold star in four straight tournaments. On Day 11 of the tournament, Hakunofuji appeared to collapse from his left knee in his loss against Aonishiki. He withdrew from the tournament two days later, with his medical certificate indicating a MTP ligament injury to his left big toe requiring about four weeks of treatment. The withdrawal left Hakunofuji with a losing record for the tournament.

==== Assault allegations ====
A few days after the rankings were released for the March 2026 tournament, it was reported that the Japan Sumo Association's compliance committee was investigating allegations that Hakunofuji was physically assaulted by his stablemaster Isegahama (the former Terunofuji). Hakunofuji was reportedly questioned by the Sumo Association along with Isegahama and stablemate Nishikifuji, and did not initially join practice sessions at his stable's Osaka training location. On the day that the allegations were reported, the former Terunofuji was asked about the allegations, as well as Hakunofuji's absence from training in Osaka at the time. Isegahama stated that Hakunofuji's absence was probably due to his ligament injury, and that he would join the rest of the stable in a few days.

Despite the ongoing scandal investigation and his inability to do proper practice, Hakunofuji decided to compete in the March 2026 tournament. However, he appeared to re-injure his left foot in his day one loss to Ōshoma. He would withdraw from the tournament the next day, marking the fifth time he has gone kyūjō in his career. He returned to competition on Day 7, facing Ōnokatsu, who returned two days prior.

In early April, the JSA investigation concluded that Hakunofuji had been struck twice in the face by his stablemaster during an evening event with patrons between February 20 and 21. The blows, delivered with a clenched fist and an open hand, were intended to discipline Hakunofuji, who was drunk and had inappropriately touched a female patron's thigh during a supporters' club appreciation party. The investigation also ruled out the use of a bottle in the violence incident, contrary to what had initially been reported in the press. Although he was a victim of violence, Hakunofuji faced disciplinary action for his behavior while intoxicated, which violated the association's statutes regarding conduct that undermines the association's credibility or honor. In the absence of a complaint from the female fan and given Hakunofuji's previously unblemished record, he was issued a formal warning. Commenting on the punishment, Tateyama (the former Homarefuji), a coach at Isegahama stable, reported that Hakunofuji was deeply sorry for his actions and that he would henceforth prevent him from drinking alcohol at future stable events.

During the July 2026 tournament, Hakunofuji stood out by earning the fifth gold star win of his career on the sixth day with a victory over Hōshōryū. In November 2026 tournament, he repeated the feat by winning another kinboshi against Hōshōryū.

== Fighting style ==
Hakunofuji is recognised as a wrestler who can adapt to any technique. Just before his makuuchi debut, he defined his fighting style as relying mainly on speed and a low stance, enabling him to easily reach his opponent's mawashi. His profile on the official website of the Japanese Sumo Association defines his favourite hold as hidari-yotsu, a right hand outside, left hand inside grip on his opponent's mawashi.

To perfect his technique, he regularly watches the old matches of his master (former yokozuna Hakuhō), particularly for the latter's ability to quickly seize his opponent's mawashi and destabilise him with throwing techniques.

== Personal life ==
Hakunofuji is the youngest in his family and has two older brothers. His hobbies include enka, period drama and his favourite movies are The Chronicles of Narnia.

Hakunofuji has been friends with former amateur sumo champion and gridiron football up and comer Hidetora Hanada since junior high school. Living in the United States, Hanada returned to Japan in May 2024 and went to cheer on then-Hakuōhō at the Ryōgoku Kokugikan.

== Career record ==
Hakunofuji Tetsuya
Year	January Hatsu basho, Tokyo	March Haru basho, Osaka	May Natsu basho, Tokyo	July Nagoya basho, Nagoya	September Aki basho, Tokyo	November Kyūshū basho, Fukuoka
2023	Makushita tsukedashi #15; 7–0; Champion	West Jūryō #14; 10–5	West Jūryō #8; 14–1–P	West Maegashira #17; 11–4; FT	West Maegashira #9; Sat out due to injury 0–0–15	West Jūryō #6; Sat out due to injury 0–0–15
2024	West Makushita #5; 6–1	West Jūryō #13; 8–7	West Jūryō #8; 5–6–4	East Jūryō #13; 11–4	West Jūryō #5; 8–7	West Jūryō #2; 10–5
2025	East Maegashira #15; 10–5	East Maegashira #9; 9–6	East Maegashira #7; 8–7	East Maegashira #4; 8–7 ★	East Maegashira #2; 8–7; O★	East Maegashira #1; 6–9 ★
2026	West Maegashira #3; 5–8–2 ★	West Maegashira #7; 5–6–4	West Maegashira #10; 11–4; F	West Maegashira #3; 9–6 ★	East Komusubi #1; 5–10	West Maegashira #3; 5–10 ★
Record given as wins–losses–absences Top division champion Top division runner-up Retired Non-participation Jūryō Lower divisions Sanshō key: F=Fighting spirit; O=Outstanding performance; T=Technique Also shown: ★=Kinboshi; P=Playoff(s); Divisions: Makuuchi — Jūryō — Makushita — Sandanme — Jonidan — Jonokuchi Makuuchi ranks: Yokozuna — Ōzeki — Sekiwake — Komusubi — Maegashira

== See also ==
- Glossary of sumo terms
- List of active sumo wrestlers
- List of active gold star earners
- List of active special prize winners
- List of komusubi
