= Kotoekō Mitsunori =

Japanese sumo wrestler

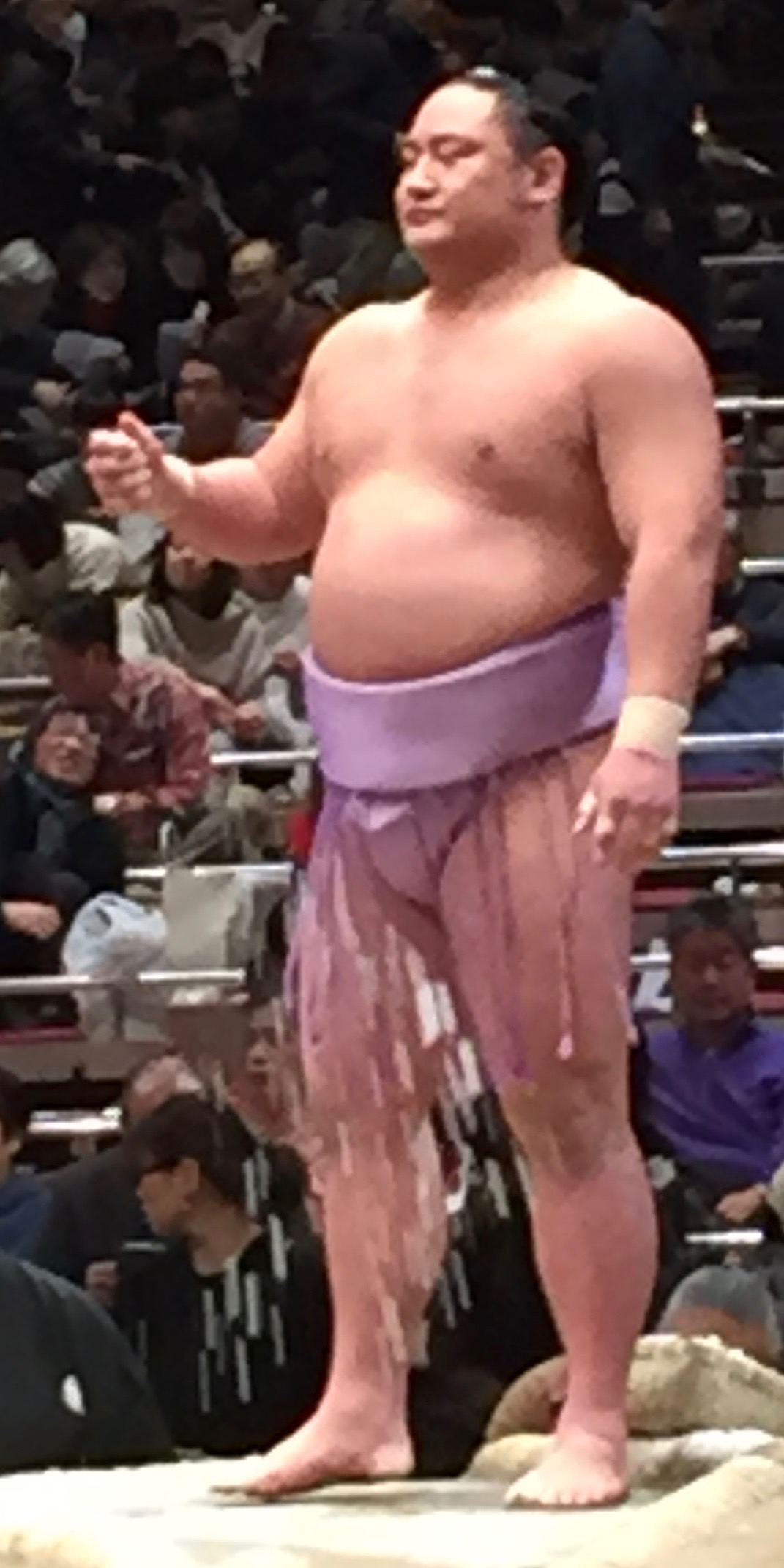
- Kotoekō in 2017

Personal information
- Native name: 琴恵光 充憲
- Born: Mitsutaka Kashiwadani; November 20, 1991 (age 34) Nobeoka, Miyazaki, Japan
- Height: 1.77 m (5 ft 9 1/2 in)
- Weight: 127 kg (280 lb; 20.0 st)

Sport
- Sport: Sumo
- Retired: May, 2024
- Heya: Sadogatake
- Record: 531-542-14
- Debut: March, 2007
- Highest rank: Maegashira 4 (July, 2021)
- Elder name: Oguruma
- Updated on 17 May 2024

Kotoekō Mitsunori (Japanese: 琴恵光 充憲; born 20 November 1991 as Mitsutaka Kashiwadani (柏谷 充隆, Kashiwadani Mitsutaka)) is a Japanese former professional sumo wrestler from Nobeoka, Miyazaki. He is a member of the Sadogatake stable and he made his professional debut in March 2007. In July 2018, he reached the top makuuchi division. He retired in May 2024 and inherited the name Oguruma to work as a coach within the Japan Sumo Association.

== Early life and sumo background ==
Born the grandson of former juryo rikishi Matsueyama he was introduced to sumo at an early age. He was also attracted to judo at a young age as well participating in it from primary school on up. He led his elementary school to the best eight in judo, and his junior high school team to the Miyazaki prefecture championship. Originally he intended on going to high school as a judo player and wanted to become a cook joining the family restaurant with his father and grandfather after graduation. However he was inspired instead to join professional sumo after observing a practice session held by Sadogatake stable at their Kyushu lodgings.

== Career ==
He would join Sadogatake stable in March 2007 at the age of 15. He weighed just 94 kg and was only 175 cm tall, and his stablemaster was concerned about whether he would be able to gain enough weight. He originally took the shikona Kotokashiwadani Mitsutaka (琴柏谷 充隆) by simply adding the stable's traditional prefix "Koto" to his family name. He took a year from his debut to reach the fourth sandanme division but there he would hit his first road block. He would spend three years going up and down the sandanme division before finally reaching the third makushita division. He would then take the shikona Kotoekō borrowing the second kanji 恵 from his grandfather's name. After another three years bouncing back and forth between the fourth and third divisions and on the back of five straight winning records he was promoted to the second juryo division. He was the first sekitori from Miyazaki Prefecture in 32 years, the last being Kusatake who spent just one tournament in juryo in January 1982.

He lasted only one tournament in the division, managing only a 5–10 record and being demoted back down to the third division. After a 4–3 winning record at makushita 1 he was immediately promoted back to the juryo division. However a 4–11 record saw him again demoted back to the third division. After a year in the makushita division he got a third chance as a sekitori in the juryo division and this time he did get his first winning record of 9–6 to remain in juryo. He became a juryo mainstay for a year and a half before an 11–4 record gained him promotion to the top makuuchi division. He was the first wrestler from Miyazaki Prefecture to reach the top division in 44 years (Kaneshiro being the last in September 1974). His promotion meant Kotoekō had achieved a goal he had set of exceeding his grandfather's highest rank.

In his first tournament in the top division he would perform rather poorly, managing only a 3–12 record and being demoted back to the juryo division. Two winning tournaments in September and November 2018 saw him promoted back to the top division. Even after two 7–8 losing records in January and March 2019 he remained at the same rank of maegashira 15 West, and in May he finally got his first winning record in the top division with an 8–7 winning record. He reached the rank of maegashira 7 in September 2019 but faced demotion to jūryō after only two wins against thirteen losses in the January 2020 tournament. With a good performance of 11-4 in the March tournament, he secured his return to makuuchi, where he posted a respectable 10 wins in July. He finished the 2020 season with records of 8-7 and 6-9 in September and November.

To begin 2021 he was ranked maegashira 11. That year he posted three losing records and three winning records. After going 9-6 in the May tournament, he was rewarded with the rank of maegashira 4, his highest yet. A 2-13 record in July meant he was demoted to back to maegashira 11. He went 3-12 in the last tournament of the year, leading to a rank of maegashira 17 to start 2022.

Kotoekō started 2022 with back-to-back kachi-koshi in the January and March tournaments. These performances saw him rise to the rank of maegashira 7 for the May tournament. However, a 6-9 record in May, followed a 5-6-4 (with absence due to a COVID-19 infection) record in July and 6-9 record in September saw him demoted to maegashira 12 ahead of the November tournament. He ended the last tournament of 2022 with a 7-8 record, losing to Nishikigi on the final day.

Kotoekō began his 2023 campaign with a ranking of maegashira 13 in the January banzuke. In the first tournament of the year he finished with a 7-8 record, this time losing to Tobizaru on the final day. Later in the year, during the November tournament, he withdrew from the competition after suffering a knee joint injury requiring approximately two weeks of treatment. Since many comments drew attention to the fact that he would a priori not rejoin the competition, it is expected that Kotoekō will lose his maegashira rank and be relegated to jūryō for the first time since March 2020. His absence also marks the end of his continuous presence in tournaments, which ranked him seventh among the wrestlers with a streak of consecutive matches.

Kotoekō was forced to withdraw during the November 2023 tournament due to an injury to his left MCL. His withdrawal ended his streak of 1,043 consecutive matches since beginning his career in 2007, not including absences due to unavoidable circumstances such as COVID protocols.

In May 2024 Kotoekō announced his retirement, however inheriting the name Oguruma in order to remain a trainer with the Japan Sumo Association. At his retirement press conference he shared his thanks with those gathered, adding that he had been a sumo wrestler for a long time and so felt a sense of sadness, but had really done his best with his body.

Kotoekō's retirement ceremony was held at the Ryōgoku Kokugikan on 31 May 2025.

== Fighting style ==
Kotoekō favoured a migiyotsu (right hand inside, left hand outside grip on his opponent's mawashi). His favourite winning kimarite was a straightforward oshidashi, or push out. He also regularly employed yorikiri, or force-out, and tsukiotoshi, or the thrust down.

== Personal life ==
In September 2023, the Japan Sumo Association announced Kotoekō had become engaged.

== Career record ==
Kotoekō Mitsunori
Year	January Hatsu basho, Tokyo	March Haru basho, Osaka	May Natsu basho, Tokyo	July Nagoya basho, Nagoya	September Aki basho, Tokyo	November Kyūshū basho, Fukuoka
2007	x	(Maezumo)	East Jonokuchi #14; 3–4	East Jonokuchi #14; 5–2	West Jonidan #96; 5–2	East Jonidan #53; 4–3
2008	West Jonidan #28; 4–3	West Jonidan #5; 3–4	East Jonidan #23; 5–2	West Sandanme #89; 3–4	West Jonidan #5; 5–2	West Sandanme #68; 4–3
2009	West Sandanme #51; 3–4	East Sandanme #67; 3–4	East Sandanme #84; 5–2	East Sandanme #54; 5–2	East Sandanme #28; 2–5	East Sandanme #50; 4–3
2010	East Sandanme #36; 4–3	East Sandanme #22; 3–4	West Sandanme #37; 3–4	East Sandanme #57; 5–2	East Sandanme #27; 3–4	West Sandanme #40; 3–4
2011	East Sandanme #61; 4–3	West Sandanme #45; Tournament Cancelled; Match fixing investigation 0–0–0	West Sandanme #45; 5–2	West Sandanme #5; 4–3	West Makushita #54; 2–5	West Sandanme #19; 3–4
2012	East Sandanme #35; 2–5	East Sandanme #64; 6–1	West Sandanme #9; 3–4	West Sandanme #25; 5–2	West Makushita #60; 4–3	West Makushita #52; 3–4
2013	West Sandanme #2; 5–2	West Makushita #40; 4–3	West Makushita #31; 3–4	West Makushita #42; 5–2	West Makushita #26; 3–4	East Makushita #33; 2–5
2014	West Makushita #46; 6–1	West Makushita #19; 6–1	East Makushita #8; 4–3	East Makushita #5; 4–3	East Makushita #3; 5–2	East Jūryō #12; 5–10
2015	West Makushita #1; 4–3	East Jūryō #13; 4–11	West Makushita #6; 3–4	East Makushita #14; 6–1	East Makushita #5; 4–3	East Makushita #3; 2–5
2016	West Makushita #12; 5–2	East Makushita #7; 4–3	West Makushita #4; 5–2	East Jūryō #14; 9–6	East Jūryō #10; 11–4	East Jūryō #2; 6–9
2017	West Jūryō #6; 8–7	East Jūryō #5; 5–10	West Jūryō #9; 8–7	West Jūryō #7; 7–8	West Jūryō #9; 8–7	East Jūryō #7; 5–10
2018	West Jūryō #10; 9–6	East Jūryō #8; 10–5	East Jūryō #2; 11–4	East Maegashira #14; 3–12	East Jūryō #5; 9–6	West Jūryō #1; 8–7
2019	West Maegashira #15; 7–8	West Maegashira #15; 7–8	West Maegashira #15; 8–7	East Maegashira #10; 9–6	West Maegashira #7; 7–8	West Maegashira #7; 5–10
2020	West Maegashira #13; 2–13	East Jūryō #5; 11–4	West Maegashira #16; Tournament Cancelled; State of Emergency; 0–0–0	West Maegashira #16; 10–5	West Maegashira #10; 8–7	West Maegashira #9; 6–9
2021	West Maegashira #11; 6–9	East Maegashira #14; 8–7	East Maegashira #12; 9–6	East Maegashira #4; 2–13	West Maegashira #11; 8–7	East Maegashira #8; 3–12
2022	East Maegashira #17; 8–7	East Maegashira #12; 9–6	West Maegashira #7; 6–9	West Maegashira #9; 5–6–4	West Maegashira #9; 6–9	East Maegashira #12; 7–8
2023	West Maegashira #13; 7–8	West Maegashira #13; 8–7	West Maegashira #12; 8–7	East Maegashira #11; 8–7	East Maegashira #8; 6–9	West Maegashira #10; 2–8–5
2024	West Jūryō #4; 3–10–2	East Jūryō #12; 1–14	West Makushita #11; Retired; 0–0–3	x	x	x
Record given as wins–losses–absences Top division champion Top division runner-up Retired Lower divisions Non-participation Sanshō key: F=Fighting spirit; O=Outstanding performance; T=Technique Also shown: ★=Kinboshi; P=Playoff(s); Divisions: Makuuchi — Jūryō — Makushita — Sandanme — Jonidan — Jonokuchi Makuuchi ranks: Yokozuna — Ōzeki — Sekiwake — Komusubi — Maegashira

== See also ==
- Glossary of sumo terms
- List of past sumo wrestlers
