= Nishikigi Tetsuya =

Japanese sumo wrestler

Nishikigi Tetsuya 錦木 徹也
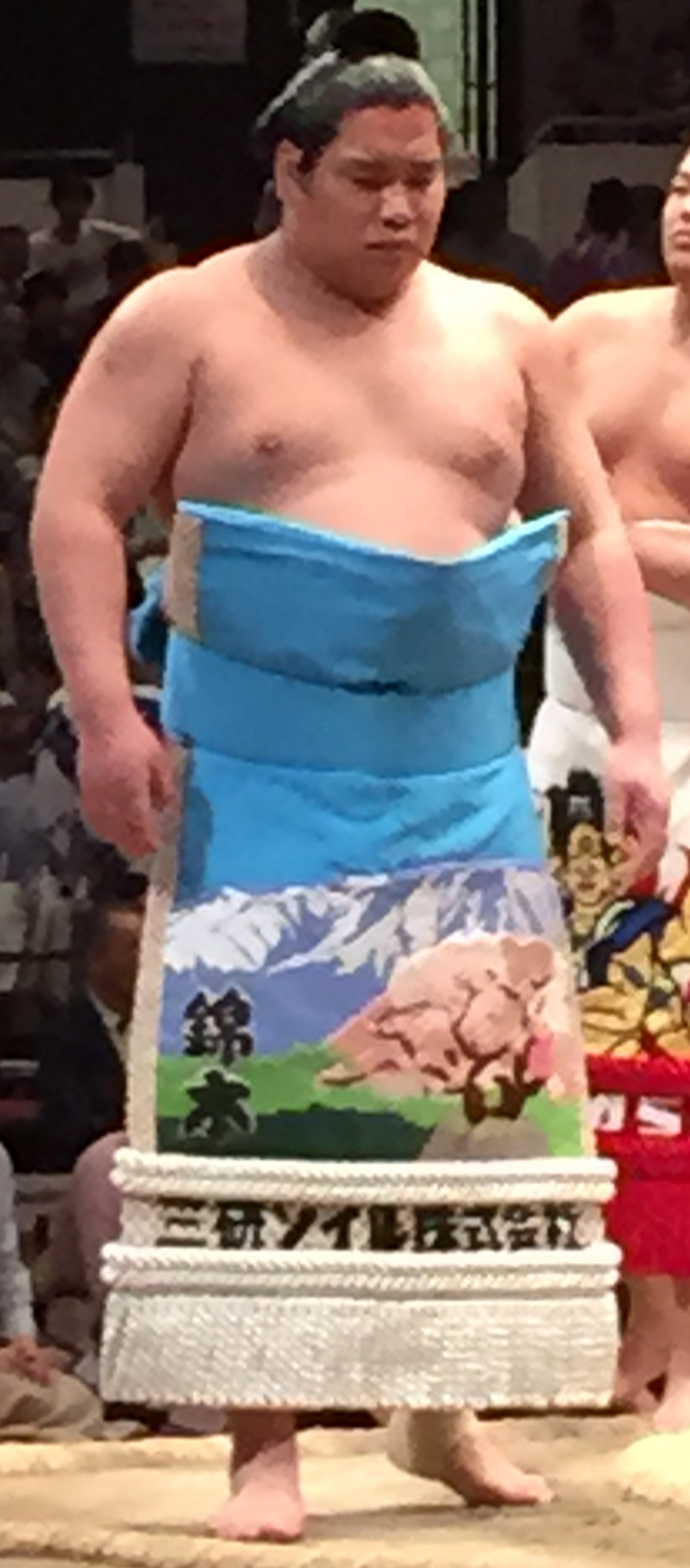
- Nishikigi in 2015

Personal information
- Born: Tetsuya Kumagai; 25 August 1990 (age 36) Morioka, Iwate, Japan
- Height: 1.85 m (6 ft 1 in)
- Weight: 184 kg (406 lb; 29.0 st)

Sport
- Sport: Sumo
- Rank: see below
- Heya: Isenoumi
- Debut: March, 2006
- Highest rank: Komusubi (September 2023)
- Championships: 1 Jūryō; 1 Makushita
- Special Prizes: Outstanding Performance (1); Fighting Spirit (1)
- Gold Stars: 2 (Kakuryū, Terunofuji)
- Updated on 24 September 2023

Nishikigi Tetsuya (Japanese: 錦木 徹也; born 25 August 1990 as Tetsuya Kumagai (熊谷 徹也)) is a Japanese professional sumo wrestler from Morioka. He made his debut in March 2006 and wrestles for Isenoumi stable. His highest rank has been komusubi and he has won championships at jūryō and makushita level.

== Early life and sumo experience ==
Having met the former owner of the Isenoumi stable ex-sekiwake Fujinokawa, Kumagai heard about Yotsuguruma, a sumo wrestler before him who is also from Iwate prefecture and it inspired him to join sumo himself. He joined this stable after graduating from a local Morioka city junior high school.

Nishikigi has extremely poor vision and always wears glasses when not practicing or competing, even wearing them for post-bout interviews. He has stated he is unable to see any fans in the crowd during tournaments which helps keep him from getting nervous.

== Career ==
=== Early career ===
He first stepped onto the dohyō in March 2006. He joined sumo the same time as future top division wrestlers Tochinoshin, Sakaizawa, and Shōhōzan. He worked his way slowly up the ranks, earning sandanme division promotion in July 2008 and makushita in January 2010. However, he struggled in the third division and soon fell back to sandanme. Though he was soon back in makushita he languished at this level. He managed to contend for the makushita' championship in November 2010, where he lost in a multiple wrestler playoff, and won the championship in this division outright with a 6–1 record in November 2012. However, continuing mediocre performances kept him in the third division for four and a half years. During these struggling years, he took the ring name of Nishikigi. He was the first wrestler in 144 years to take this name. However, starting in September 2014, 4 consecutive 5-2 records propelled him to the salaried ranks of jūryō for the May 2015 tournament. Finding his stride, it took him a year to work his way up through jūryō and after recording ten wins in January 2016 he was promoted to the top division makuuchi for the first time.

=== Makuuchi promotion ===
In the top division, Nishikigi initially made little impact but nine wins in July followed by eight in September saw him promoted to a career high of maegashira 6. He then began to struggle and after three consecutive losing records he was demoted back to jūryō after the March tournament. Wrestling at jūryō 4 in May he lost his first two matches but in an unusually open division he entered the penultimate day on 8-5 in a seven-way tie for the lead. After beating Homarefuji he clinched the yūshō or championship on the final day with a victory over the veteran Aminishiki.

He was promoted back to makuuchi for the July 2017 tournament where he secured his majority of wins against losses on the last day with a defeat of Tokushōryū. He remained near the bottom of the makuuchi division for the next year, just barely avoiding demotion to jūryō before a 10–5 result in September 2018, coupled with a collapse in the form of higher-ranked wrestlers, saw him promoted to maegashira 3. Despite fears that he would be badly exposed at the rank and starting with four straight defeats he rallied to end with an 8–7 result and was promoted to a new career high of maegashira 2 for the January 2019 tournament. He won his first three matches in January, defeating ōzeki Gōeidō and Tochinoshin and earning his first kinboshi or yokozuna upset with a win over Kakuryū. He then had a default win over the retiring Kisenosato to stand undefeated on 4–0, but he lost seven in a row after that and finished with a 7–8 record.

Nishikigi did not manage a winning record in any tournament in 2019, and was demoted to the jūryō division after the November 2019 tournament. He secured 11 wins and 4 losses in the January 2020 tournament, enough for immediate promotion back to the makuuchi division. However, he then embarked on another run of losing records, and fell to near the bottom of the jūryō division by May 2021.

Three winning records from September 2021 to January 2022 saw him return to the top division for the March 2022 tournament. Having already achieved a majority of wins in the July 2022 tournament, he was forced to withdraw on Day 13 due to a COVID-19 outbreak at his stable. This was the first time since his debut in 2006 that he had withdrawn from a tournament, but his run of over 1000 consecutive career appearances will be allowed to continue as the Sumo Association do not regard a withdrawal due to COVID protocols through no fault of the wrestler as breaking a streak.

On the second day of the July 2023 tournament, Nishikigi, then ranked as maegashira 1, defeated yokozuna Terunofuji by suikuinage, thus winning his second kinboshi, the first in four years, and continuing his run of 10 wins in a row. Nishikigi would go on to defeat most of the wrestlers ranked above him in the first week. On the ninth day of the tournament, Nishikigi claimed an eighth victory in his match against former ōzeki Mitakeumi and maintained his position as one of the tournament leaders with only one defeat. With this victory, Nishikigi strengthened his case for promotion to san'yaku status, which would be the first of his career. After claiming his tenth victory over Endō, Nishikigi received positive feedback from JSA chairman Hakkaku, who praised his style which was compared to that of a yokozuna or an ōzeki, as well as his mental strength. Despite leading the tournament, Nishikigi nevertheless suffered crucial defeats in the final days of the tournament, particularly against makuuchi-newcomers Shōnannoumi (Day 12) and Hakuōhō (Day 13). On Day 14, he recorded a third defeat in a row to Ryūden, which took him out of the title race.

=== San'yaku ===
Nishikigi was rewarded with a promotion to the san'yaku rank of komusubi for the September 2023 tournament. Nishikigi took 103 tournaments to reach san'yaku–the third-slowest in sumo history behind Kumegawa (former Kotoinazuma), who needed 106 tournaments, and former Tamaryū, who needed 107. After the September banzuke was released Nishikigi was happy to see his name listed under the new rank, telling reporters that he wanted to say "I did my best" rather than say "I was late." His stablemaster Isenoumi said that the promotion was the result of Nishikigi's own training. He also said that while Nishikigi may be a veteran at 33 years of age, he feels young, joking that he finally learned to sumo when he was 31 or 32.

At the September sōken on 2 September, however, Nishikigi injured his right calf after a butsukari training session with former ōzeki Shōdai. Commenting on the state of his calf, he ruled out withdrawal from the September tournament, which begins on 10 September. During the March 2024 tournament, Nishikigi, who had once again been promoted to the rank of komusubi, bounced back and again defeated Yokozuna Terunofuji on the first day of the tournament.

== Fighting style ==
Nishikigi was initially an oshi-sumo specialist who preferred pushing and thrusting at his opponents to fighting on the mawashi or belt, but has developed his yotsu-sumo technique to become a more balanced competitor, his favourite grip being hidari yotsu (left arm inside, right arm outside) . His Japan Sumo Association profile shows that 66 percent of his victories over the last six tournaments have been by either yori-kiri (force out) or oshi-dashi (push out).

== Personal life ==
Nishikigi was married in September 2018, with the reception being held in February 2020. He has a daughter born in November 2019.

== Career record ==
Nishikigi Tetsuya
Year	January Hatsu basho, Tokyo	March Haru basho, Osaka	May Natsu basho, Tokyo	July Nagoya basho, Nagoya	September Aki basho, Tokyo	November Kyūshū basho, Fukuoka
2006	x	(Maezumō)	West Jonokuchi #35; 4–3	East Jonidan #125; 4–3	East Jonidan #95; 3–4	West Jonidan #111; 4–3
2007	West Jonidan #81; 4–3	West Jonidan #56; 3–4	West Jonidan #73; 4–3	East Jonidan #47; 3–4	East Jonidan #67; 5–2	East Jonidan #29; 4–3
2008	West Jonidan #5; 3–4	East Jonidan #22; 2–5	West Jonidan #52; 6–1	West Sandanme #85; 5–2	East Sandanme #52; 3–4	West Sandanme #63; 4–3
2009	West Sandanme #45; 3–4	West Sandanme #56; 6–1	East Sandanme #4; 3–4	West Sandanme #16; 3–4	East Sandanme #34; 4–3	East Sandanme #19; 5–2
2010	East Makushita #58; 4–3	East Makushita #50; 1–6	East Sandanme #21; 4–3	West Sandanme #7; 6–1	West Makushita #31; 3–4	East Makushita #37; 6–1–P
2011	West Makushita #14; 3–4	West Makushita #22; Tournament Cancelled; Match fixing investigation 0–0–0	West Makushita #22; 3–4	West Makushita #22; 2–5	West Makushita #35; 4–3	East Makushita #31; 3–4
2012	West Makushita #39; 5–2	East Makushita #23; 4–3	West Makushita #20; 2–5	West Makushita #33; 6–1	West Makushita #13; 1–6	East Makushita #35; 7–0; Champion
2013	East Makushita #3; 3–4	East Makushita #6; 2–5	East Makushita #14; 5–2	West Makushita #8; 3–4	East Makushita #15; 4–3	East Makushita #10; 3–4
2014	East Makushita #16; 4–3	West Makushita #10; 2–5	West Makushita #22; 4–3	West Makushita #18; 3–4	West Makushita #24; 5–2	West Makushita #15; 5–2
2015	West Makushita #7; 5–2	West Makushita #2; 5–2	West Jūryō #13; 9–6	West Jūryō #9; 5–10	East Jūryō #14; 8–7	East Jūryō #11; 10–5
2016	East Jūryō #6; 8–7	West Jūryō #2; 10–5	East Maegashira #14; 7–8	West Maegashira #14; 9–6	East Maegashira #9; 8–7	East Maegashira #6; 4–11
2017	West Maegashira #11; 5–10	East Maegashira #16; 5–10	East Jūryō #4; 10–5; Champion	East Maegashira #15; 8–7	East Maegashira #13; 6–9	East Maegashira #15; 7–8
2018	West Maegashira #15; 8–7	West Maegashira #14; 5–10	East Maegashira #17; 10–5	West Maegashira #10; 6–9	West Maegashira #12; 10–5	East Maegashira #3; 8–7
2019	East Maegashira #2; 7–8 ★	East Maegashira #3; 4–11	East Maegashira #9; 5–10	West Maegashira #11; 6–9	West Maegashira #13; 6–9	West Maegashira #14; 4–11
2020	East Jūryō #4; 11–4	West Maegashira #14; 6–9	East Maegashira #16; Tournament Cancelled; State of Emergency; 0–0–0	East Maegashira #16; 6–9	West Jūryō #1; 6–9	West Jūryō #4; 6–9
2021	West Jūryō #7; 4–11	West Jūryō #13; 7–8	West Jūryō #13; 9–6	East Jūryō #10; 7–8	West Jūryō #10; 10–5	West Jūryō #5; 8–7
2022	East Jūryō #2; 9–6	East Maegashira #16; 9–6	West Maegashira #10; 8–7	West Maegashira #8; 8–5–2	East Maegashira #4; 6–9	East Maegashira #6; 8–7
2023	West Maegashira #5; 9–6	West Maegashira #3; 6–9	West Maegashira #4; 9–6	East Maegashira #1; 10–5; O★	East Komusubi #1; 5–10	West Maegashira #4; 7–8
2024	West Maegashira #5; 8–7	West Komusubi #1; 3–12	East Maegashira #7; 5–10	West Maegashira #11; 5–10	West Maegashira #13; 11–4; F	West Maegashira #6; 5–10
2025	East Maegashira #12; 8–7	East Maegashira #10; 3–12	West Maegashira #16; 6–9	East Jūryō #1; 8–7	West Maegashira #16; 2–13	West Jūryō #6; 4–11
2026	East Jūryō #12; 7–8	East Jūryō #12; 8–7	West Jūryō #11; 5–10	West Jūryō #14; 7–8	West Jūryō #14; 6–9	East Makushita #2; 3–4
Record given as wins–losses–absences Top division champion Top division runner-up Retired Non-participation Jūryō Lower divisions Sanshō key: F=Fighting spirit; O=Outstanding performance; T=Technique Also shown: ★=Kinboshi; P=Playoff(s); Divisions: Makuuchi — Jūryō — Makushita — Sandanme — Jonidan — Jonokuchi Makuuchi ranks: Yokozuna — Ōzeki — Sekiwake — Komusubi — Maegashira

== See also ==
- Glossary of sumo terms
- List of active sumo wrestlers
- List of active gold star earners
- List of active special prize winners
- List of sumo second division champions
- List of komusubi
