= Asaarashi Daizaburō =

Japanese sumo wrestler (1943–2023)

Personal information
- Native name: 朝嵐 大三郎
- Born: Junji Sasaki; 8 July 1943 Higashiyodogawa-ku, Osaka, Japan
- Died: 2 April 2023 (aged 79) Koshigaya, Japan
- Height: 1.83 m (6 ft 0 in)
- Weight: 110 kg (240 lb)

Sport
- Sport: Sumo
- Retired: March, 1973
- Heya: Takasago
- Record: 403-425-7
- Debut: March, 1959
- Highest rank: Maegashira 12 (May, 1969)
- Elder name: Takadagawa; Furiwake

Asaarashi Daizaburō (Japanese: 朝嵐 大三郎; 8 July 1943 – 2 April 2023), born Junji Sasaki (笹木 淳二, Sasaki Junji), was a former sumo wrestler from Higashiyodogawa, Osaka, Japan. He made his professional debut in March 1959, and reached the top division in May 1969. His highest rank was maegashira 12. Upon retirement from active competition, he became an elder in the Japan Sumo Association, under the name Takadagawa. He later acquired the Furiwake name (used afterward by Takamisakari and Hōchiyama) and reached the Sumo Association's mandatory retirement age in July 2008.

Asaarashi died of a heart attack on 2 April 2023 at the age of 79.

== Career record ==
Asaarashi Daizaburō
Year	January Hatsu basho, Tokyo	March Haru basho, Osaka	May Natsu basho, Tokyo	July Nagoya basho, Nagoya	September Aki basho, Tokyo	November Kyūshū basho, Fukuoka
1959	x	(Maezumo)	(Banzukegai)	(Maezumo)	West Jonokuchi #24; 4–4	East Jonidan #148; 0–8
1960	East Jonokuchi #11; 4–4	East Jonidan #130; 4–4	East Jonidan #106; 2–6	East Jonidan #116; 5–2	East Jonidan #71; 1–6	East Jonidan #97; 2–5
1961	East Jonidan #108; 5–2	West Jonidan #34; 2–5	East Jonidan #70; 4–3	West Jonidan #27; 3–4	West Jonidan #37; 6–1	East Sandanme #84; 5–2
1962	East Sandanme #43; 3–4	West Sandanme #50; 4–3	West Sandanme #38; 3–4	East Sandanme #42; 5–2	West Sandanme #6; 6–1	East Makushita #72; 2–5
1963	East Makushita #95; 5–2	West Makushita #65; 4–3	West Makushita #58; 2–5	East Makushita #71; 5–2	West Makushita #47; 3–4	East Makushita #54; 3–4
1964	East Makushita #58; 3–4	East Makushita #59; 1–6	West Makushita #84; 5–2	West Makushita #66; 4–3	West Makushita #57; 3–4	East Makushita #63; 4–3
1965	West Makushita #57; 4–3	West Makushita #50; 5–2	East Makushita #30; 4–3	West Makushita #26; 4–3	West Makushita #24; 5–2	East Makushita #10; 4–3
1966	East Makushita #7; 3–4	West Makushita #8; 5–2	West Makushita #2; 5–2	East Jūryō #18; 9–6	West Jūryō #9; 7–8	West Jūryō #9; 6–9
1967	West Jūryō #13; 6–9	East Jūryō #17; 5–10	West Makushita #9; 5–2	West Makushita #3; 6–1	West Jūryō #10; 6–9	East Jūryō #13; 7–8
1968	East Makushita #1; 4–3	West Jūryō #13; 3–12	East Makushita #5; 4–3	West Makushita #2; 5–2	West Jūryō #13; 8–7	East Jūryō #11; 9–6
1969	West Jūryō #5; 9–6	East Jūryō #1; 8–7	East Maegashira #12; 5–10	West Jūryō #4; 6–9	Jūryō #8; 8–7	West Jūryō #5; 7–8
1970	West Jūryō #7; 9–6	West Jūryō #3; 8–7	East Jūryō #2; 5–10	East Jūryō #9; 5–10	West Jūryō #13; 9–6	East Jūryō #9; 8–7
1971	West Jūryō #5; 6–9	West Jūryō #11; 4–11	East Makushita #7; 4–3	West Makushita #4; 4–3	West Makushita #1; 6–1	East Jūryō #11; 8–7
1972	East Jūryō #9; 6–9	East Jūryō #11; 8–7	West Jūryō #6; 6–9	West Jūryō #9; 8–7	East Jūryō #6; 7–8	East Jūryō #7; 5–10
1973	West Jūryō #11; 3–12	East Makushita #9; Retired; 0–0–7	x	x	x	x
Record given as wins–losses–absences Top division champion Top division runner-up Retired Lower divisions Non-participation Sanshō key: F=Fighting spirit; O=Outstanding performance; T=Technique Also shown: ★=Kinboshi; P=Playoff(s); Divisions: Makuuchi — Jūryō — Makushita — Sandanme — Jonidan — Jonokuchi Makuuchi ranks: Yokozuna — Ōzeki — Sekiwake — Komusubi — Maegashira

== See also ==
- Glossary of sumo terms
- List of past sumo wrestlers
