= Patellar subluxation syndrome =

Displacement of the patella

- Other names: Patellar instability, patellar dislocation
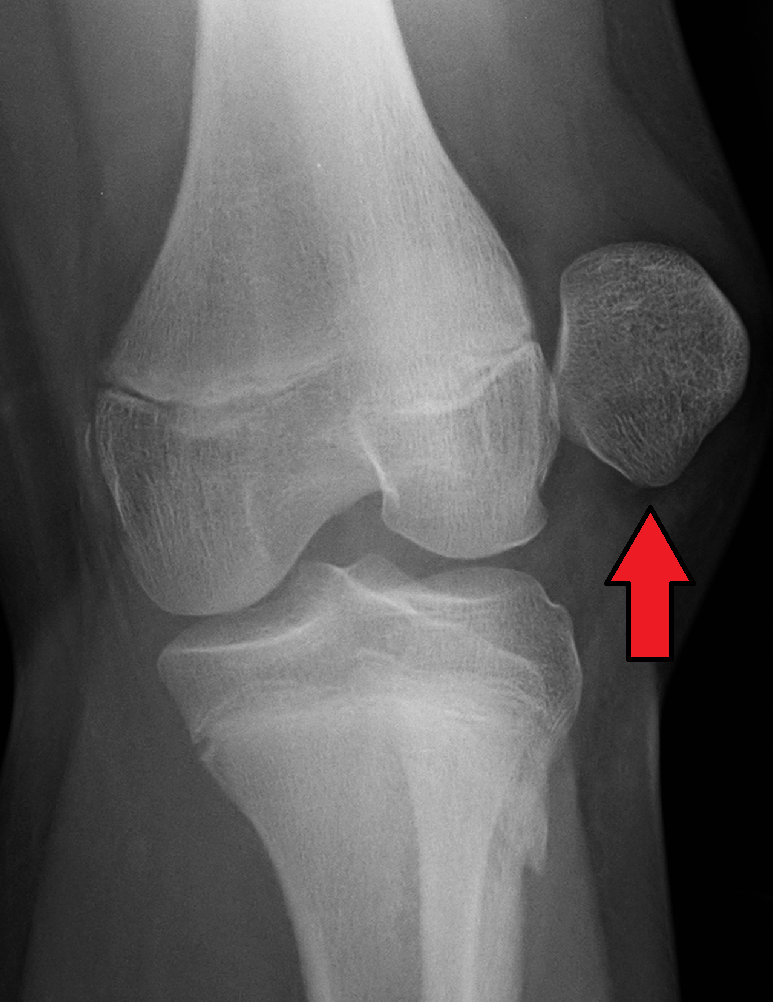
- Arrow points to lateral displacement of the patella
- Symptoms: Pain; swelling; knee instability or locking
- Complications: Soft tissue trauma; mobility impairment; chronic arthritis
- Usual onset: Sudden
- Causes: Sports trauma
- Diagnostic method: Patellar displacement; patellar tendon tear
- Treatment: Rehabilitation by physical therapy and muscular development
- Medication: Over-the-counter analgesics
- Prognosis: Chronic susceptibility
- Frequency: About 3% of all knee injuries

Patellar subluxation syndrome is an injury involving the patella (or "kneecap". Representing 3% of all knee injuries, patellar subluxation is more common than patellar dislocation and initially limits mobility.

In this condition, the patella displaces laterally from the trochlear groove in the patellofemoral joint. Patellar subluxation can be caused by osseous abnormalities, such as incorrect articulation of the femoral groove with the patella, trochlear dysplasia, or patella alta, which is a distance of greater than 20 mm between the tibial tubercle and the trochlear groove. It can also result from soft-tissue abnormalities, such as a torn medial patellofemoral ligament, or a weakened vastus medialis obliquus. Symptoms are regulated by the amount of activity. The condition is commonly caused by sports activities that place large forces on the patellofemoral joint.

== Signs and symptoms ==
Main symptoms include visible dislocation of the patella, usually to the lateral side, pain, instability of the knee joint, and locking of the knee.

== Treatment ==
Most cases of patellar subluxation resolve spontaneously by passively extending the leg while applying pressure to the lateral side of the patella, which then returns to the trochlear groove.

=== Conservative treatment ===
Conservative treatment in primary acute LPD (lateral patellar dislocation) is the therapy of choice. It includes a multimodal approach with behavioural education of the patient, physical therapy, braces, weight reduction and pain medication.

Physical therapy especially focuses on muscle strengthening and proprioceptive exercises. The vastus medialis oblique muscle is described to have an important role in functional stabilization of the patella against lateral vector force. Proprioceptive exercises and strengthening of the hip abductors and positioning of the foot are crucial, especially indicated in patient with miserable malalignment syndrome or medial collapse.

Several patellar braces or taping methods exist to improve return to sport. They may however not alter medial or lateral displacement, but can be helpful as a diagnostic tool for occult patellofemoral instability.

=== Surgical treatment options ===
Increasing age is associated with decreased physical activity after surgical stabilization, and therefore in growing and active athletes early surgical treatment intervention needs to be considered. Reconstruction of the MPFL (medial patellofemoral ligament) in patients with minor trochlear dysplasia is technically possible without interfering with distal growth plate of the femur, however, large studies are missing. Osseous articular correction before epiphyseal closure is contraindicated.

In adult patients with recurrent patellar subluxation and without trochlear dysplasia or type A or C according to Dejour classification, MPFL reconstruction alone might be beneficial, in which unchanged osseous or dynamic instability will be compensated. Patients with an important supra-trochlear spur as in type B and D trochlear dysplasia and chronic instability are more reluctant to conservative and soft-tissue surgical treatment options. In such cases, sulcus-deepening trochleoplasty may be considered.
