= 2019 in sumo =

The following are the events in professional sumo during 2019.

== Tournaments ==
=== January ===
Hatsu basho

Ryōgoku Kokugikan, Tokyo, 13 January – 27 January

2019 Hatsu basho results - Makuuchi Division
W		L		A	East			Rank	West			W		L		A
0	-	4	-	11	ø	(Japan)	Kisenosato	Y	ø	(Mongolia)	**Hakuhō**	10	-	4	-	1
2	-	3	-	10	ø	(Mongolia)	Kakuryū	Y	ø			0	-	0	-	0
9	-	6	-	0		(Japan)	**Takayasu**	O		(Japan)	**Gōeidō**	9	-	6	-	0
0	-	0	-	0	ø			O	ø	(Georgia (country))	Tochinoshin	0	-	4	-	11
11	-	4	-	0		(Japan)	**Takakeishō**	S		(Mongolia)	**Tamawashi**	13	-	2	-	0
5	-	10	-	0		(Japan)	Myōgiryū	K		(Japan)	**Mitakeumi**	8	-	4	-	3
6	-	9	-	0		(Japan)	Tochiōzan	M1		(Mongolia)	Ichinojō	6	-	9	-	0
7	-	8	-	0		(Japan)	Nishikigi	M2		(Japan)	**Hokutofuji**	9	-	6	-	0
7	-	8	-	0		(Japan)	Shōdai	M3		(Japan)	Shōhōzan	5	-	10	-	0
6	-	9	-	0		(Japan)	Kotoshōgiku	M4		(Japan)	Okinoumi	7	-	8	-	0
7	-	8	-	0		(Bulgaria)	Aoiyama	M5		(Japan)	Yoshikaze	3	-	12	-	0
8	-	7	-	0		(Japan)	**Chiyotairyū**	M6		(Japan)	**Ōnoshō**	8	-	7	-	0
6	-	9	-	0		(Japan)	Ryūden	M7		(Japan)	**Daieishō**	9	-	6	-	0
10	-	5	-	0		(Brazil)	**Kaisei**	M8		(Japan)	**Asanoyama**	8	-	7	-	0
0	-	0	-	15	ø	(Mongolia)	Takanoiwa	M9		(Japan)	**Endō**	10	-	5	-	0
9	-	6	-	0		(Japan)	**Takarafuji**	M10		(Japan)	**Abi**	10	-	5	-	0
9	-	6	-	0		(Japan)	**Sadanoumi**	M11		(Japan)	**Ikioi**	9	-	6	-	0
6	-	9	-	0		(Japan)	Kagayaki	M12		(Japan)	**Meisei**	8	-	7	-	0
9	-	6	-	0		(Japan)	**Yago**	M13	ø	(Japan)	Kotoyūki	4	-	7	-	4
6	-	9	-	0		(Japan)	Yutakayama	M14		(Mongolia)	Chiyoshōma	6	-	9	-	0
8	-	3	-	4	ø	(Japan)	**Chiyonokuni**	M15		(Japan)	Kotoekō	7	-	8	-	0
4	-	11	-	0		(Japan)	Daiamami	M16		(Japan)	Daishōmaru	3	-	12	-	0

ø - Indicates a pull-out or absent rank
**winning record in bold**
**Yusho Winner**

=== March ===
Haru basho

Osaka Prefectural Gymnasium, Osaka, 10 March – 24 March

2019 Haru basho results - Makuuchi Division
W		L		A	East			Rank	West			W		L		A
15	-	0	-	0		(Mongolia)	**Hakuhō**	Y		(Mongolia)	**Kakuryū**	10	-	5	-	0
10	-	5	-	0		(Japan)	**Takayasu**	O		(Japan)	**Gōeidō**	12	-	3	-	0
7	-	8	-	0		(Georgia (country))	Tochinoshin	O	ø			0	-	0	-	0
10	-	5	-	0		(Japan)	**Takakeishō**	S		(Mongolia)	Tamawashi	5	-	10	-	0
7	-	8	-	0		(Japan)	Mitakeumi	K		(Japan)	Hokutofuji	7	-	8	-	0
3	-	12	-	0		(Brazil)	Kaisei	M1		(Japan)	Endō	7	-	8	-	0
7	-	8	-	0		(Japan)	Daieishō	M2		(Japan)	Myōgiryū	6	-	9	-	0
4	-	11	-	0		(Japan)	Nishikigi	M3		(Japan)	Shōdai	5	-	10	-	0
3	-	12	-	0		(Japan)	Tochiōzan	M4		(Mongolia)	**Ichinojō**	14	-	1	-	0
8	-	7	-	0		(Japan)	**Chiyotairyū**	M5		(Japan)	Ōnoshō	5	-	10	-	0
8	-	7	-	0		(Japan)	**Okinoumi**	M6		(Japan)	**Abi**	8	-	7	-	0
12	-	3	-	0		(Bulgaria)	**Aoiyama**	M7		(Japan)	**Takarafuji**	8	-	7	-	0
7	-	8	-	0		(Japan)	Asanoyama	M8		(Japan)	**Kotoshōgiku**	11	-	4	-	0
5	-	10	-	0		(Japan)	Sadanoumi	M9		(Japan)	Ikioi	2	-	13	-	0
7	-	8	-	0		(Japan)	Shōhōzan	M10		(Japan)	Yago	6	-	9	-	0
10	-	5	-	0		(Japan)	**Ryūden**	M11		(Japan)	**Meisei**	9	-	6	-	0
0	-	0	-	15	ø	(Japan)	Chiyonokuni	M12		(Japan)	**Yoshikaze**	10	-	5	-	0
9	-	6	-	0		(Japan)	**Tomokaze**	M13		(Japan)	**Kagayaki**	9	-	6	-	0
6	-	9	-	0		(Japan)	Terutsuyoshi	M14		(Japan)	Toyonoshima	5	-	10	-	0
6	-	9	-	0		(Japan)	Ishiura	M15		(Japan)	Kotoekō	7	-	8	-	0
7	-	8	-	0		(Mongolia)	Daishōhō	M16		(Japan)	Yutakayama	3	-	12	-	0
7	-	8	-	0		(Mongolia)	Chiyoshōma	M17				0	-	0	-	0

ø - Indicates a pull-out or absent rank
**winning record in bold**
**Yusho Winner**

=== May ===
Natsu basho - Cancelled

Ryōgoku Kokugikan, Tokyo, 12 May – 26 May

2019 Natsu basho results - Makuuchi Division
W		L		A	East			Rank	West			W		L		A
0	-	0	-	15	ø	(Mongolia)	Hakuhō	Y		(Mongolia)	**Kakuryū**	11	-	4	-	0
9	-	6	-	0		(Japan)	**Gōeidō**	O		(Japan)	**Takayasu**	9	-	6	-	0
3	-	4	-	8		(Japan)	Takakeishō	O	ø			0	-	0	-	0
5	-	7	-	3		(Mongolia)	Ichinojō	S		(Georgia (country))	**Tochinoshin**	10	-	5	-	0
6	-	9	-	0		(Bulgaria)	Aoiyama	K		(Japan)	**Mitakeumi**	9	-	6	-	0
7	-	8	-	0		(Japan)	Hokutofuji	M1		(Japan)	Kotoshōgiku	6	-	9	-	0
7	-	8	-	0		(Japan)	Endō	M2		(Japan)	Daieishō	7	-	8	-	0
6	-	9	-	0		(Japan)	Chiyotairyū	M3		(Mongolia)	**Tamawashi**	10	-	5	-	0
5	-	10	-	0		(Japan)	Okinoumi	M4		(Japan)	**Abi**	10	-	5	-	0
6	-	9	-	0		(Japan)	Myōgiryū	M5		(Japan)	**Ryūden**	10	-	5	-	0
8	-	7	-	0		(Japan)	**Takarafuji**	M6		(Japan)	Yoshikaze	4	-	11	-	0
10	-	5	-	0		(Japan)	**Shōdai**	M7		(Japan)	**Meisei**	10	-	5	-	0
3	-	5	-	7	ø	(Brazil)	Kaisei	M8		(Japan)	**Asanoyama**	12	-	3	-	0
5	-	10	-	0		(Japan)	Nishikigi	M9		(Japan)	**Tomokaze**	8	-	7	-	0
5	-	10	-	0		(Japan)	Kagayaki	M10		(Japan)	**Ōnoshō**	8	-	7	-	0
8	-	7	-	0		(Japan)	**Shōhōzan**	M11		(Japan)	Tochiōzan	6	-	9	-	0
10	-	5	-	0		(Japan)	**Shimanoumi**	M12		(Japan)	Yago	6	-	9	-	0
7	-	8	-	0		(Japan)	Chiyomaru	M13		(Japan)	Sadanoumi	7	-	8	-	0
4	-	11	-	0		(Japan)	Tokushōryū	M14		(Japan)	Enhō	7	-	8	-	0
6	-	9	-	0		(Japan)	Terutsuyoshi	M15		(Japan)	**Kotoekō**	8	-	7	-	0
9	-	6	-	0		(Mongolia)	**Daishōhō**	M16		(Japan)	Ishiura	5	-	10	-	0
5	-	10	-	0		(Mongolia)	Chiyoshōma	M17				0	-	0	-	0

ø - Indicates a pull-out or absent rank
**winning record in bold**
**Yusho Winner**

=== July ===
Nagoya basho

Aichi Prefectural Gymnasium, Nagoya, 7 July – 21 July

2019 Nagoya basho results - Makuuchi Division
W		L		A	East			Rank	West			W		L		A
14	-	1	-	0		(Mongolia)	**Kakuryū**	Y		(Mongolia)	**Hakuhō**	12	-	3	-	0
3	-	5	-	7		(Japan)	Gōeidō	O	ø	(Japan)	**Takayasu**	8	-	3	-	4
0	-	0	-	15	ø	(Japan)	Takakeishō	O	ø	(Georgia (country))	Tochinoshin	0	-	6	-	9
9	-	6	-	0		(Japan)	**Mitakeumi**	S		(Mongolia)	Tamawashi	5	-	10	-	0
8	-	7	-	0		(Japan)	**Abi**	K		(Japan)	Ryūden	4	-	11	-	0
7	-	8	-	0		(Japan)	Asanoyama	M1		(Japan)	**Hokutofuji**	9	-	6	-	0
8	-	7	-	0		(Bulgaria)	**Aoiyama**	M2		(Japan)	**Endō**	10	-	5	-	0
7	-	8	-	0		(Japan)	Shōdai	M3		(Japan)	**Daieishō**	8	-	7	-	0
4	-	11	-	0		(Japan)	Meisei	M4		(Mongolia)	**Ichinojō**	9	-	6	-	0
7	-	8	-	0		(Japan)	Kotoshōgiku	M5		(Japan)	Takarafuji	6	-	9	-	0
8	-	7	-	0		(Japan)	**Chiyotairyū**	M6		(Japan)	**Shimanoumi**	8	-	7	-	0
8	-	7	-	0		(Japan)	**Myōgiryū**	M7		(Japan)	**Tomokaze**	11	-	4	-	0
6	-	9	-	0		(Japan)	Ōnoshō	M8		(Japan)	**Okinoumi**	8	-	7	-	0
6	-	9	-	0		(Japan)	Shōhōzan	M9		(Mongolia)	Daishōhō	6	-	9	-	0
9	-	6	-	0		(Japan)	**Kotoekō**	M10		(Japan)	Takagenji	4	-	11	-	0
0	-	0	-	15	ø	(Japan)	Yoshikaze	M11		(Japan)	Nishikigi	6	-	9	-	0
5	-	10	-	0		(Japan)	Tochiōzan	M12		(Japan)	Kagayaki	7	-	8	-	0
5	-	10	-	0		(Japan)	Chiyomaru	M13		(Japan)	**Sadanoumi**	9	-	6	-	0
7	-	8	-	0		(Japan)	Toyonoshima	M14		(Japan)	**Enhō**	9	-	6	-	0
4	-	11	-	0		(Japan)	Yago	M15	ø	(Brazil)	Kaisei	1	-	10	-	4
11	-	4	-	0		(Japan)	**Kotoyūki**	M16		(Japan)	**Terutsuyoshi**	12	-	3	-	0

ø - Indicates a pull-out or absent rank
**winning record in bold**
**Yusho Winner**

=== September ===
Aki basho

Ryōgoku Kokugikan, Tokyo, 8 September – 22 September

2019 Aki basho results - Makuuchi Division
W		L		A	East			Rank	West			W		L		A
4	-	4	-	7	ø	(Mongolia)	Kakuryū	Y	ø	(Mongolia)	Hakuhō	0	-	2	-	13
0	-	0	-	15	ø	(Japan)	Takayasu	O		(Japan)	**Gōeidō**	10	-	5	-	0
6	-	9	-	0		(Georgia (country))	Tochinoshin	O	ø			0	-	0	-	0
12	-	3	-	0		(Japan)	**Mitakeumi***	S		(Japan)	**Takakeishō**	12	-	3	-	0
9	-	6	-	0		(Japan)	**Abi**	K		(Japan)	**Endō**	8	-	7	-	0
9	-	6	-	0		(Japan)	**Hokutofuji**	M1		(Bulgaria)	Aoiyama	5	-	10	-	0
1	-	4	-	10	ø	(Mongolia)	Ichinojō	M2		(Japan)	**Asanoyama**	10	-	5	-	0
8	-	7	-	0		(Japan)	**Daieishō**	M3		(Japan)	Tomokaze	7	-	8	-	0
7	-	8	-	0		(Mongolia)	Tamawashi	M4		(Japan)	Shōdai	3	-	12	-	0
2	-	13	-	0		(Japan)	Chiyotairyū	M5		(Japan)	Ryūden	7	-	8	-	0
5	-	10	-	0		(Japan)	Shimanoumi	M6		(Japan)	**Myōgiryū**	8	-	5	-	2
6	-	9	-	0		(Japan)	Kotoshōgiku	M7		(Japan)	Kotoekō	7	-	8	-	0
11	-	4	-	0		(Japan)	**Okinoumi**	M8		(Japan)	**Takarafuji**	9	-	6	-	0
4	-	11	-	0		(Japan)	Terutsuyoshi	M9		(Japan)	**Kotoyūki**	9	-	6	-	0
8	-	7	-	0		(Japan)	**Sadanoumi**	M10		(Japan)	**Meisei**	10	-	5	-	0
9	-	6	-	0		(Japan)	**Ōnoshō**	M11		(Japan)	**Enhō**	9	-	6	-	0
9	-	6	-	0		(Japan)	**Shōhōzan**	M12		(Mongolia)	Daishōhō	5	-	10	-	0
6	-	9	-	0		(Japan)	Kagayaki	M13		(Japan)	Nishikigi	6	-	9	-	0
10	-	5	-	0		(Japan)	**Tsurugishō**	M14	ø	(Japan)	Toyonoshima	1	-	9	-	5
8	-	7	-	0		(Japan)	**Ishiura**	M15		(Mongolia)	Azumaryū	6	-	9	-	0
10	-	5	-	0		(Japan)	**Yutakayama**	M16		(Japan)	Tochiōzan	6	-	9	-	0
4	-	11	-	0		(Japan)	Takagenji	M17				0	-	0	-	0

ø - Indicates a pull-out or absent rank
**winning record in bold**
**Yusho Winner**

* Indicates a playoff victory

=== November ===
Kyushu basho

Fukuoka Kokusai Center, Kyushu, 10 November – 24 November

2019 Kyushu basho results - Makuuchi Division
W		L		A	East			Rank	West			W		L		A
0	-	1	-	14	ø	(Mongolia)	Kakuryū	Y		(Mongolia)	**Hakuhō**	14	-	1	-	0
0	-	2	-	13		(Japan)	Gōeidō	O	ø	(Japan)	Takayasu	3	-	5	-	7
9	-	6	-	0		(Japan)	**Takakeishō**	O				0	-	0	-	0
6	-	9	-	0		(Japan)	Mitakeumi	S	ø	(Georgia (country))	Tochinoshin	2	-	3	-	10
9	-	6	-	0		(Japan)	**Abi**	K		(Japan)	Endō	7	-	8	-	0
7	-	8	-	0		(Japan)	Hokutofuji	K		(Japan)	**Asanoyama**	11	-	4	-	0
8	-	7	-	0		(Japan)	**Daieishō**	M1		(Japan)	Okinoumi	6	-	9	-	0
8	-	7	-	0		(Japan)	**Myōgiryū**	M2		(Japan)	Meisei	6	-	9	-	0
6	-	9	-	0		(Japan)	Takarafuji	M3	ø	(Japan)	Tomokaze	0	-	3	-	12
8	-	7	-	0		(Mongolia)	**Tamawashi**	M4		(Japan)	**Kotoyūki**	8	-	7	-	0
6	-	9	-	0		(Bulgaria)	Aoiyama	M5		(Japan)	Ryūden	6	-	9	-	0
7	-	8	-	0		(Japan)	Ōnoshō	M6		(Japan)	**Enhō**	8	-	7	-	0
6	-	9	-	0		(Japan)	Tsurugishō	M7		(Japan)	Kotoekō	5	-	10	-	0
8	-	7	-	0		(Japan)	**Shōhōzan**	M8		(Japan)	Sadanoumi	7	-	8	-	0
6	-	9	-	0		(Japan)	Kotoshōgiku	M9		(Japan)	**Yutakayama**	8	-	7	-	0
6	-	9	-	0		(Japan)	Shimanoumi	M10		(Japan)	**Shōdai**	11	-	4	-	0
9	-	6	-	0		(Japan)	**Ishiura**	M11		(Japan)	**Chiyotairyū**	9	-	6	-	0
0	-	0	-	15	ø	(Mongolia)	Ichinojō	M12		(Japan)	**Takanoshō**	10	-	5	-	0
9	-	6	-	0		(Japan)	**Chiyomaru**	M13		(Japan)	**Kagayaki**	10	-	5	-	0
8	-	7	-	0		(Japan)	**Terutsuyoshi**	M14		(Japan)	Nishikigi	4	-	11	-	0
5	-	10	-	0		(Japan)	Daishōmaru	M15		(Mongolia)	Daishōhō	3	-	12	-	0
4	-	1	-	10	ø	(Japan)	Wakatakakage	M16				0	-	0	-	0

ø - Indicates a pull-out or absent rank
**winning record in bold**
**Yusho Winner**

== News ==
=== January ===
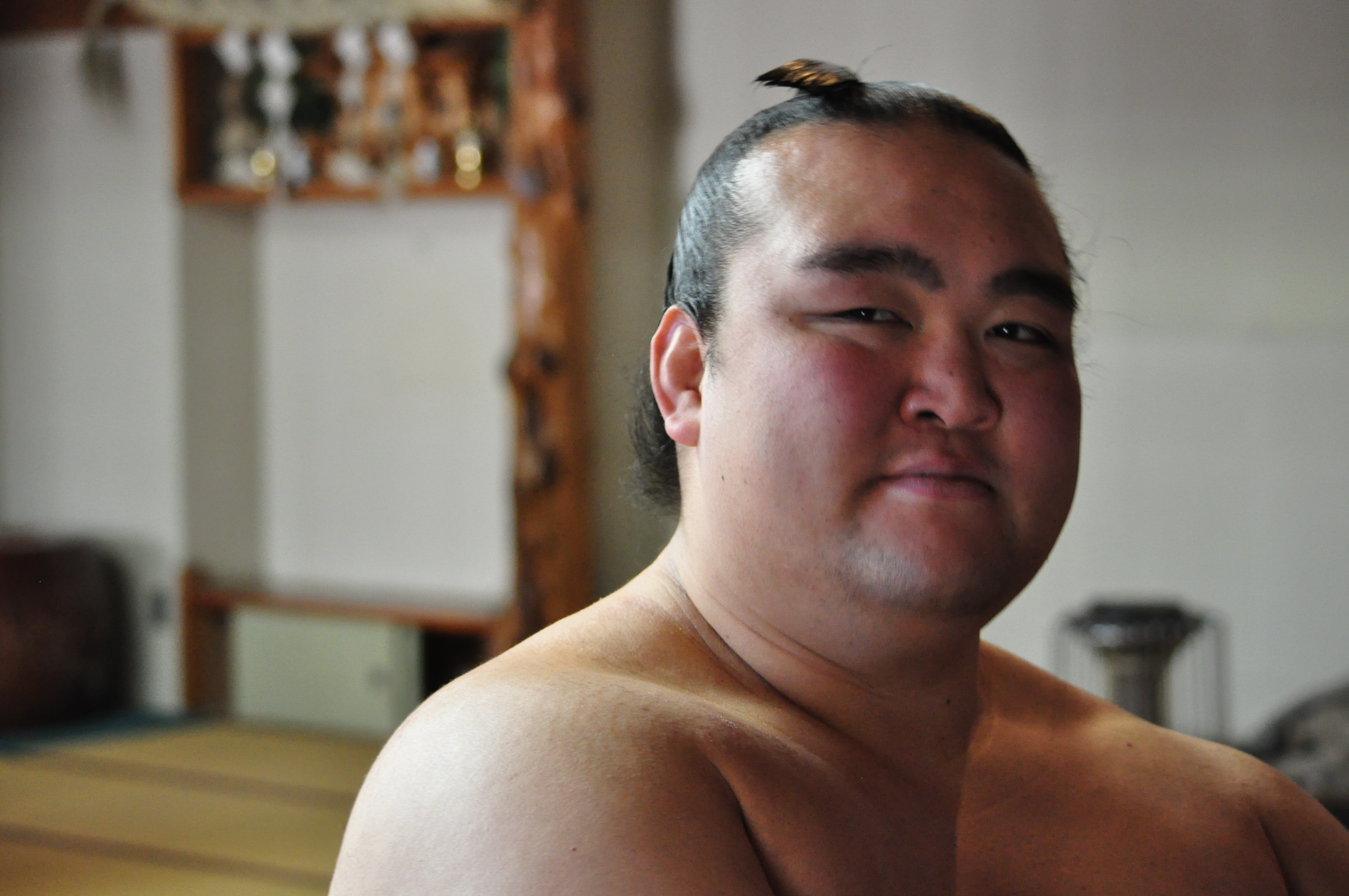
Kisenosato announced his retirement in January

- 7: In a series of practice bouts held in front of the Yokozuna Deliberation Council, all three yokozuna participate. Kisenosato goes 1–3 against Kakuryū and 2–0 against Gōeidō, while Hakuhō wins all five of his bouts against November 2018 tournament winner Takakeishō.
- 16: After suffering three straight losses in the Hatsu tournament, Kisenosato announces his retirement. He had been unable to recover from a left arm injury sustained in the March 2017 tournament, which caused him to miss or withdraw from eight consecutive tournaments from May 2017 to July 2018. His record as a yokozuna was 36 wins against 35 losses, with 97 bouts missed. He is staying in sumo as a coach under the Araiso elder name.
- 18: Kakuryū pulls out with a recurrence of his ankle problem.
- 20: Emperor Akihito and Empress Michiko attend Day 8, the 23rd and last time before the Emperor's abdication in April that they have watched sumo in an official capacity.
- 26: Hakuho withdraws with knee and ankle injuries, meaning all three yokozuna have failed to complete 15 days for the second tournament in a row.
- 27: Sekiwake Tamawashi is the surprise tournament champion with a 13–2 record, sealing his first yusho by defeating Endō on the final day. At 34 he is the second oldest first-time yusho winner in the six tournaments per year era (post-1958), after 37 year-old Kyokutenhō in 2012. Takakeisho could have taken part in a playoff if Tamawashi had lost and he had won, but in the event he finished two wins behind on 11–4 after losing to Gōeidō. That defeat, and a 9–6 record in September 2018, means he will not be promoted to ōzeki despite winning 33 bouts in three tournaments and being the sole runner-up here. Tamawashi receives special prizes for Outstanding Performance and Fighting Spirit, while Takakeisho wins the Technique Award. Mitakeumi is awarded a share of the Outstanding Performance Prize for defeating all three yokozuna and Tamawashi despite missing some of the tournament through injury. The jūryō division championship is won by Shimanoumi. Retiring along with Kisenosato are Takanoiwa, former sekiwake Takekaze, and Sasayama, the brother of jūryō wrestler Daiseidō.
- 30: Promotions to the jūryō division for the forthcoming March tournament are announced. Returning are Daiseidō and Takanofuji (who changed his shikona from Takayoshitoshi in January). There are two newcomers – Michinoku stable's Kiribayama from Mongolia, and Arashio stable's Wakamotoharu. The latter has two brothers in sumo, one of whom (Wakatakakage) is already in jūryō. This means there will be three sets of brothers in the jūryō division in March (Hidenoumi and Tobizaru, and Takanofuji and Takagenji being the others).

=== February ===
- 9: The 52nd NHK charity ozumo tournament is held at the Kokugikan.
- 10: The 43rd Fuji TV one day tournament is held at the Kokugikan. Takayasu defeats Yoshikaze in the final. (Hakuho is knocked out in the second round.)

=== March ===
- 24: The Haru tournament in Osaka concludes with Hakuhō defeating his rival yokozuna Kakuryū with a shitatenage underarm throw to clinch his 42nd career championship and his 15th with a perfect 15–0 score. His victory means he has won at least one tournament every year since 2006. However, he injures his right arm in the process and is seen holding the bicep afterwards. He finishes one win ahead of maegashira Ichinojō, who did not get to fight the yokozuna during the tournament. His 14–1 runner-up performance is recognized with the Outstanding Performance prize. Sekiwake Takakeishō not only wins the Technique Award but also promotion to ōzeki, after he defeats Tochinoshin to finish on 10–5, giving him 34 wins over the last three tournaments. Tochinoshin, conversely, is demoted from ōzeki after two consecutive make-koshi or losing records. The Fighting Spirit Prize goes to maegashira Aoiyama for his fine 12–3 record. In the jūryō division Shimanoumi wins his second championship in a row and is guaranteed promotion to the top division for the first time in May at the age of 29. Down in the jonidan division former ōzeki Terunofuji, long sidelined by injuries, loses a playoff for the division championship after both he and Russian-Mongolian wrestler Rōga finish with perfect 7–0 records. It is Terunofuji's first appearance since May 2018. Former maegashira Tenkaiho retires and becomes Hidenoyama Oyakata.
- 27:Promotions to jūryō are announced. They are newcomer Irodori, and two returnees, Irodori's Shikoroyama stablemate Seirō and Haru's makushita yusho winner Churanoumi.
- 28: Hakuhō and his stablemaster Miyagino are summoned by the Sumo Association to explain why Hakuhō led the crowd in a display of sanbon-jime hand-clapping after his victory speech on Sunday, seen as a breach of etiquette because it preceded the kami-okuri ceremony that concludes the tournament. Hakuhō had wanted to acknowledge Emperor Akihito, as it was the final tournament of the Heisei era. Hakuhō was also criticized in November 2017 when he led the crowd in cheers in the midst of the Harumafuji assault affair.
- 31: The spring regional tour begins with a tournament in the Ise Shrine. Hakuhō performs the dohyō-iri but does not participate in any bouts due to his injury, confirmed a muscle tear in the upper right arm.

=== April ===
The spring regional tour visits the following locations:

- 1: Gojo, Nara Prefecture
- 2: Nara, Nara Prefecture
- 3: Kakogawa, Hyogo Prefecture
- 4: Toyoka, Hyogo Prefecture
- 5: Uji, Kyoto Prefecture
- 6: Tsu, Mie Prefecture
- 7: Nishio, Aichi Prefecture
- 9: Shizuoka, Shizuoka Prefecture
- 10: Hachioji, Tokyo Prefecture
- 12: Kawasaki, Kanagawa Prefecture
- 13: Fujisawa, Kanagawa Prefecture
- 14: Hitachiomiya, Ibaraki Prefecture
- 15: Yasukuni Shrine ceremonial tournament, Tokyo Prefecture
- 17: Ota, Tokyo Prefecture
- 18: Adachi, Tokyo Prefecture
- 19: Gyoda, Saitama Prefecture
- 20: Kashiwa, Chiba Prefecture
- 21: Takasaki, Gunma Prefecture
- 22: Sano, Tochigi Prefecture
- 25: Hidaka, Saitama Prefecture
- 26: Ome, Tokyo Prefecture
- 27: Yokohama, Kanagawa Prefecture
- 28: Machida, Tokyo Prefecture
- 29: Mito, Ibaraki Prefecture. On the last day of the tour, 25 wrestlers born in the Showa era (1926–89), including Hakuhō, pose for a photo to mark the last Showa Day of the Heisei era.
- 12:It is reported that the Sumo Association are arranging for President of the United States Donald Trump to visit on the final day of the May tournament as part of his trip to Japan, after hearing of his request to watch a bout.
- 12: Wakaimonogashira Hakuryū turns 65 and retires. As a wrestler from the Kagamiyama stable he spent 47 tournaments in jūryō, a record for someone who never made the top makuuchi division (his highest rank was jūryō 1).
- 24: Hakuhō is given an official reprimand, the lightest of the seven punishments available, in response to the sanbon-jime incident on the last day of the March tournament. His stablemaster Miyagino is given a salary cut of ten percent for three months.
- 30: On the last day of the Heisei era, the banzuke for the May tournament is published, with Takakeishō listed as ōzeki for the first time. There are two newcomers to the top division, Shimanoumi and Enhō. Some 50 kg lighter, and 15 cm shorter, than the average top division wrestler, Enhō is the first sekitori from Kanazawa Gakuin University.

=== May ===
Video of the May 2019 tournament, which was attended by President Donald Trump

- 1: Dressed in their black montsuki hakama, 69 of the 70 sekitori use their bodies to spell out the kanji for the new imperial era, Reiwa.
- 14: Further reports on President Donald Trump's visit on the final day of the May tournament suggest he will present a custom-made trophy to the winner, the "Trump Cup."
- 26: Donald Trump is in attendance for the final five matches of the final day of the May tournament. He presents the new trophy, officially called the President's Cup, to the winner of the championship, maegashira Asanoyama, who finishes with a 12–3 record and special prizes for Outstanding Performance and Fighting Spirit. He is the first winner without any previous sanyaku experience since Sadanoyama in 1961. He finishes one win ahead of Kakuryū (11–4). Tochinoshin, despite a controversial call by the judges in his Day 13 match with Asanoyama which reversed the referee's decision and declared that his heel had stepped out of the ring, finishes with a 10–5 record, enough to return him immediately to the ōzeki rank. Other notable performers are Abi and top division debutant Shimanoumi who share the Fighting Spirit prize with Asanoyama, and Ryūden who wins the Technique prize. The jūryō division championship is won by Takagenji with a 13–2 record. Among the retirements are former jūryō wrestlers Dewahayate and Tochihiryu. Two days earlier, former ozeki Terunofuji continued his climb back up the banzuke with a 6–1 result in Sandanme, ensuring his promotion to makushita for the next tournament in July.
- 29: Promotions to jūryō for the Nagoya tournament in July are announced. There are four newcomers, the most high profile of whom is Kotonowaka, the son of Sadogatake Oyakata (ex-sekiwake Kotonowaka) who has changed his shikona from Kotokamatani to that of his father. The other debutants are Kizakiumi, who is the younger brother of Churanoumi making them the 21st pair of brothers in history to both reach sekitori status, Ichiyamamoto the first from Nishonoseki stable to reach jūryō since Shohozan in 2010, and Onoe stable's Ryuko. There is one returnee, Takanofuji, who won the makushita championship with a perfect 7–0 record.

=== June ===
- 24: The July banzuke is published, with Takakeisho kadoban, Tochinoshin returning to ozeki and Asanoyama just missing out on a sanyaku debut, instead being ranked at maegashira 1. The only top division debut is Takagenji at maegashira 10.

=== July ===
- 16: 40-year-old Aminishiki announces his retirement from sumo after a 22-year career. He had been absent since the third day of the July tournament with a knee injury and faced demotion from the jūryō division.
- 17: For the first time since the beginning of the Showa era, all four ōzeki are absent from a tournament. Takayasu withdraws due to an elbow injury suffered against Tamawashi, giving Hakuhō a default win. Earlier in the tournament Gōeidō and Tochinoshin both withdrew, and Takakeishō was absent from the beginning and will drop to sekiwake for the September tournament.
- 21: Kakuryū defeats Hakuhō in the final match of the tournament to win his sixth top division championship, with a 14–1 record. Hakuhō finishes second on 12–3, his first runner-up performance since January 2016 (he has won seven yūshō since then). He shares the jun-yūshō with two maegashira, Terutsuyoshi and Tomokaze. Terutsuyoshi wins the Fighting Spirit Prize, and Tomokaze who was the only man to defeat Kakuryū receives the Outstanding Performance Award. The Technique Prize is shared between Endō and Enhō. The jūryō division championship is won by former amateur competitor Tsurugishō who is likely to be promoted to the top division for the first time as a result. Former maegashira Chiyonoō wins the makushita championship. Former ozeki Terunofuji posted a 6–1 record in lower makushita, continuing his climb back up the banzuke. The chief tokoyama, Tokohachi of the Miyagino stable, retires due to turning 65 years of age, after 52 years in sumo.

The summer tour visits the following locations:

- 29: Gifu, Gifu Prefecture
- 29: Habikino, Osaka Prefecture
- 30: Kusatsu, Shiga Prefecture
- 31: Echizen, Fukui Prefecture

=== August ===
The summer tour continues, visiting the following locations:

- 1: Toyama, Toyama Prefecture
- 2: Matsumoto, Nagano Prefecture
- 3: Tokorozawa, Saitama Prefecture
- 4: Togane, Chiba Prefecture
- 6: Tachikawa, Tokyo Prefecture
- 7: Chichibu, Saitama Prefecture
- 8: Utsunomiya, Tochigi, Tokyo Prefecture
- 9: Koriyama, Fukushima Prefecture
- 10: Fukushima, Fukushima Prefecture
- 11: Sendai, Miyagi Prefecture
- 12: Murayama, Yamagata Prefecture
- 13: Aomori, Aomori Prefecture
- 14: Kitatsugaru District, Aomori Prefecture
- 16: Hakodate, Hokkaido Prefecture
- 17: Sapporo, Hokkaido Prefecture
- 18: Sapporo, Hokkaido Prefecture
- 19: Kushiro, Hokkaido Prefecture
- 25: KITTE, Tokyo Prefecture
- 27: The banzuke for the September tournament is released, with Takakeishō dropping to sekiwake. Three wrestlers are promoted to the top division, the returning Ishiura and Yutakayama, and Tsurugishō who is the only newcomer. Kakuryū is the East Yokozuna, the highest position on the banzuke, and is competing in his 33rd tournament as a Yokozuna, moving him into the top ten all-time.

=== September ===
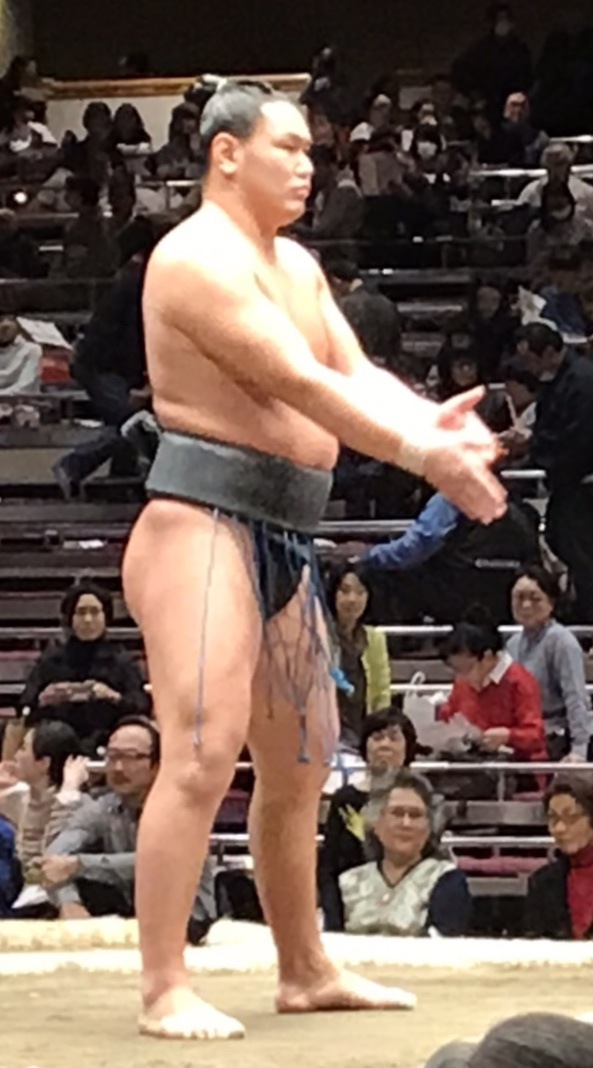
Hoshoryu was promoted to juryo after the September tournament

- 3: Takanofuji is suspended from the forthcoming Aki tournament by his stablemaster Chiganoura while the Sumo Association investigates reports that he assaulted an attendant at his stable after practice on August 31. He has already served a previous suspension for a similar incident in 2018.
- 3: Hakuhō announces that he has acquired Japanese citizenship, which will enable him to stay in the Sumo Association after retirement and run his own stable.
- 12: Former sekiwake Yoshikaze, who has missed the last two tournaments through injury, announces his retirement. He is staying in sumo under the elder name of Nakamura Oyakata.
- 22: Mitakeumi wins his second championship after a playoff with Takakeisho, both men finishing with identical 12-3 records. Takakeisho successfully returns to the ozeki rank but Tochinoshin will be demoted after only scoring 6–9. The Outstanding Performance Prize is shared between Mitakeumi and Asanoyama while the Fighting Spirit Prize goes to Okinoumi and newcomer Tsurugisho. In juryo Ikioi wins the yusho while Chiyonokuni takes the makushita title, beating former ozeki Terunofuji in his final bout. Terunofuji finishes with a 6–1 record and will be ranked in upper makushita for November. Former maegashira Daikiho and Homarefuji announce their retirements. Homarefuji becomes Tateyama Oyakata. Also retiring at the age of 24 is the nephew of Musashigawa Oyakata, the former yokozuna Musashimaru, who fought as Musashikuni and is returning to Hawai'i after six years in sumo. He sustained an ankle injury in November 2018 from which he had failed to recover properly.
- 25:Promotions to the jūryō division for November are announced. Making their debuts will be Kotoshoho (formerly known as Kototebakari) and Mongolian Hoshoryu, nephew of the former yokozuna Asashoryu. Returning to the paid ranks are Wakamotoharu, Akua, and Akiseyama.
- 28:Takanofuji is told to retire voluntarily by the Sumo Association after the compliance committee's report finds that he struck his attendant, a jonidan ranked wrestler, on the forehead for preceding him in the bath and his general attitude. However Takanofuji holds a press conference in which he says he will not retire, saying he is sorry for what he did but "this penalty is too severe and I cannot accept it." The Sumo Association has already decided to take disciplinary action at a later date, which could include expulsion.
- 29: The danpatsu-shiki or retirement ceremony of Kisenosato is held at the Kokugikan, with around 300 guests participating in the hair-cutting rituals, including Shibatayama Oyakata, his sempai Wakanosato, ex-stablemate Takanowaka, and current wrestlers Hakuhō, Kakuryu, Takayasu, Kotoshogiku and Toyonoshima. Former maegashira Satoyama has his danpatsu-shiki on the same date.

=== October ===
- The autumn tour visits the following locations:
  - 5: Nanao, Ishikawa
  - 6: Kanazawa
  - 7: Tonami
  - 8: Itoigawa
  - 9: Otawara
  - 10: Chiba
  - 11: Sagamihara
  - 12: Kofu
  - 13: Izu, Shizuoka (cancelled owing to Typhoon Hagibis)
  - 14: Yaizu
  - 16: Hamamatsu
  - 17: Tokoname
  - 18: Kyoto
  - 19: Kadoma, Osaka
  - 20: Himeji
  - 22: Aki, Kochi
  - 23: Kurashiki
  - 24: Izumo, Shimane
  - 25: Mihara, Hiroshima
  - 26: Hiroshima
  - 27: Fukuyama, Hiroshima
- 11: After his initial resistance to the Sumo Association's recommendation, Takanofuji submits his retirement papers and ends his sumo career at the age of 22. His change of heart ensures that he will receive severance pay.
- 25: The head yobidashi, Takuro, is suspended for two tournaments for hitting a junior yobidashi over the head after he caught him eating in the customer seating area on jungyo. His request to retire has also been accepted. The Sumo Association's director of public relations, Shibatayama, said that violent acts were no longer to be tolerated and it is "regrettable that such a senior official gave such guidance."
- 28: The rankings for the Kyushu tournament are released. For the first time since November 2006 there are four wrestlers at komusubi, with Hokutofuji and Asanoyama joining Abi and Endō at the rank. The only newcomer to the top division is Wakatakakage, while Takanosho, Chiyomaru and Daishomaru return.

=== November ===
- 9: Abi is reprimanded by the Japan Sumo Association after he posted an image on Instagram of his friend and fellow wrestler Wakamotoharu tied up and gagged with tape as a prank. Abi and Wakamotoharu apologize in person to JSA chairman Hakkaku and the board for the incident. The JSA has advised wrestlers not to post on their individual social media in future, although accounts run by the stables are not affected.
- 17: In the Kyushu tournament, Takayasu withdraws shortly before his scheduled bout on Day 8 because of lower back pain. He is the seventh top division wrestler to pull out of the tournament, following Ichinojo (before the tournament, back injury), Kakuryū (the morning of Day 1, back), Goeido (Day 2, ankle), Tomokaze (Day 3, knee dislocation), Wakatakakage (Day 5, ankle), and Tochinoshin (Day 5, rib)
- 23: Hakuhō secures his 43rd top division championship by defeating Mitakeumi, the winner of the previous tournament with a sotogake outside leg trip to move to an unassailable two bout lead at 13–1.
- 24: On the final day Hakuhō defeats Takakeishō (9–6) in a bout lasting over a minute to finish on 14–1, three wins ahead of his nearest rivals. Runners-up are Shodai and Asanoyama who both finish on 11–4 after Shodai wins their match today. Shodai receives the Fighting Spirit Prize while Asanoyama gets the Technique Prize. Asanoyama also has the most top division wins in the year 2019. His total of 55 is however, the lowest ever winning total (for comparison, Hakuhō had 86 wins in 2009). The Outstanding Performance Prize goes to Daieisho (8–7) as the only wrestler to defeat Hakuhō. The jūryō division championship is won by Azumaryu who wins a four-way playoff also involving Kaisei, Ikioi and Kiribayama, after all finish with identical 11–4 records. The makushita division championship is won by ex-ōzeki Terunofuji, his first championship since his comeback from injury began in March, and he is guaranteed a return to the sekitori ranks in the next tournament.
- 27: The jūryō promotions for the January 2020 tournament are announced. There are no wrestlers making their jūryō debuts, but five are returning – Terunofuji, Chiyootori, Churanoumi Yoshihisa, Asagyokusei, and Sakigake. It took Sakigake 29 tournaments to return to the paid ranks after his demotion in January 2015, the fourth slowest ever.

=== December ===
The winter tour visits the following locations:

- 1: Nogata, Fukuoka Prefecture
- 3: Shimonoseki, Yamaguchi Prefecture
- 4: Hitoyoshi, Kumamoto Prefecture
- 5: Ukiha, Fukuoka Prefecture
- 6: Oita, Oita Prefecture
- 7: Oguni, Kumamoto Prefecture
- 8: Kagoshima, Kagoshima Prefecture
- 10: Isahaya, Nagasaki Prefecture
- 11: Saga, Saga Prefecture
- 14-15: Uruma, Okinawa, Prefecture
- 24: The rankings for the January 2020 Hatsu tournament are released. Asanoyama makes his debut at sekiwake, the first from Toyama Prefecture since Kotogaume in 1986. Daieisho makes his komusubi debut. Five wrestlers return to the top division, Azumaryu, Ikioi, Tochiozan, Kaisei and Tokushoryu. There is one newcomer, Mongolian Kiribayama from Michinoku stable. Making way for them are six wrestlers demoted to jūryō, Tomokaze, Ichinojo and Wakatakakage who all suffered injuries, plus Nishikigi, Daishomaru and Daishoho.

== Deaths ==
- 10 February: The 60th Yokozuna Futahaguro, aged 55, of chronic kidney disease (not reported until 29 March).
- 14 February: Former maegashira Tokitsunada, aged 49, of heart failure.
- 16 February: Former makushita 20 Suginoyama, aged 41, of a hemorrhage caused by a blow to the head with a karaoke remote control. His attacker, former professional boxer Tomoaki Hashizume, is sentenced to seven years imprisonment in December 2019.
- 6 April: Former jūryō Saigo, aged 43, of a suspected heart attack.
- 20 April: Former maegashira Kiyonomori, also former Kise Oyakata, aged 84, of pneumonia.
- 25 April: Former sekiwake Kurohimeyama, also former Tatekuma Oyakata, aged 70, of pneumonia.
- 16 September: Former sekiwake Sakahoko, current Izutsu Oyakata, aged 58, of pancreatic cancer.
- 3 November: Former makushita 6 Haguroumi, a sewanin at Tatsunami stable, aged 53.
- 13 December: Former maegashira Ushiomaru, current Azumazeki Oyakata, aged 41, of angiosarcoma.

== See also ==
- Glossary of sumo terms
- List of active sumo wrestlers
- List of years in sumo
