= Asanoyama Hiroki =

Japanese sumo wrestler

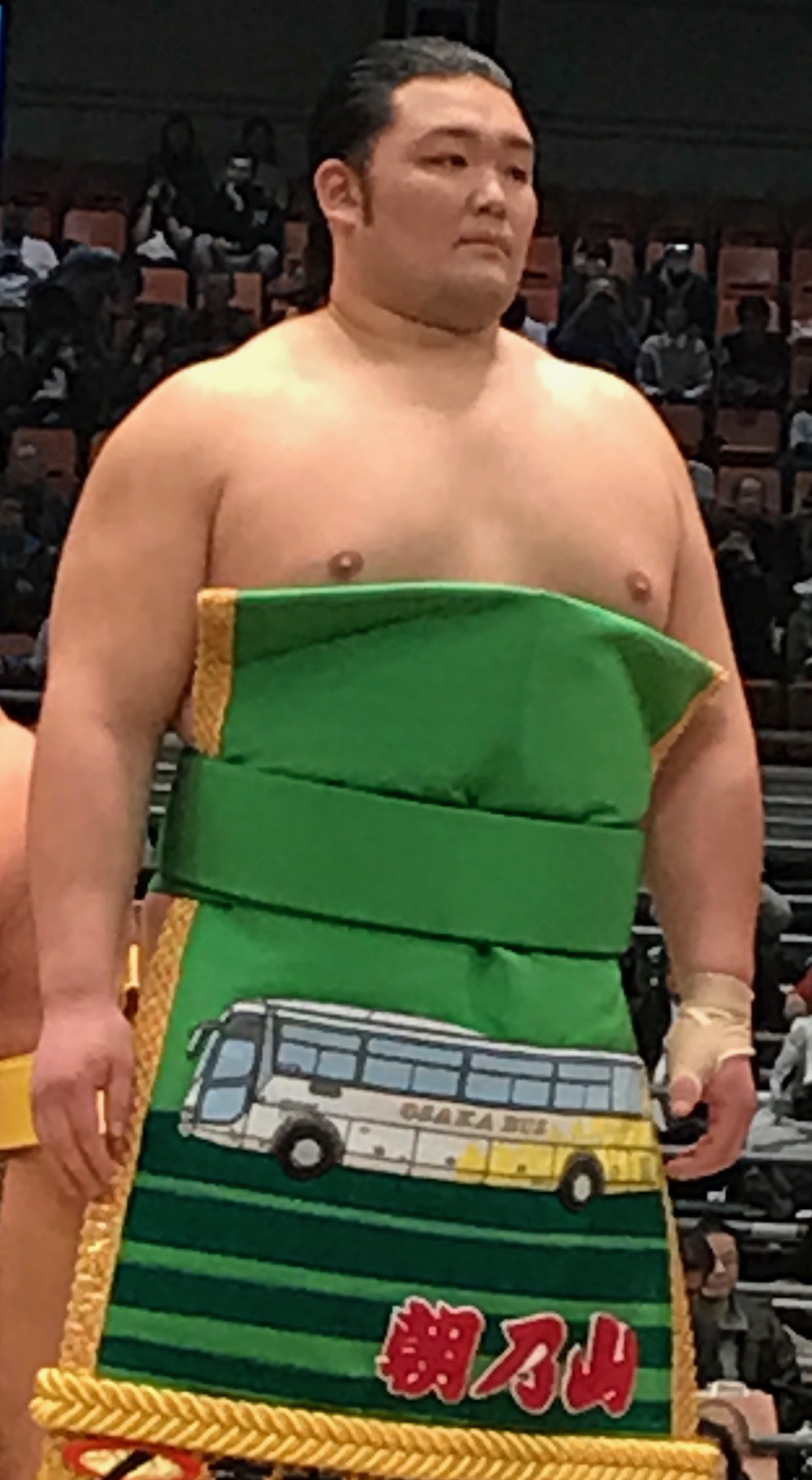
- Asanoyama in March 2017

Personal information
- Native name: 朝乃山 広暉
- Born: Hiroki Ishibashi; March 1, 1994 (age 32) Toyama Prefecture, Japan
- Height: 1.88 m (6 ft 2 in)
- Weight: 175 kg (386 lb; 27.6 st)

Sport
- Sport: Sumo
- Rank: see below
- University team: Kindai University
- Heya: Takasago
- Debut: March 2016
- Highest rank: Ōzeki (July 2020)
- Championships: 1 Makuuchi; 1 Juryo; 1 Makushita; 2 Sandanme
- Special Prizes: 3 Fighting Spirit; 2 Outstanding performance 1 Technique
- Gold Stars: 1 (Kakuryū)
- Updated on 21 March 2025

Asanoyama Hiroki (朝乃山 広暉; born Hiroki Ishibashi (石橋 広暉, Ishibashi Hiroki) on March 1, 1994) is a Japanese professional sumo wrestler from Toyama Prefecture. He wrestles for Takasago stable. He debuted in sumo in March 2016 and made his makuuchi debut in September 2017. His highest rank has been ōzeki. He has earned six special prizes, and one gold star for defeating a yokozuna. In May 2019 he won his first top division yūshō or tournament championship, the first of the Reiwa era. He was also runner-up in November 2019 and finished the calendar year with more top division wins than any other wrestler. He was promoted to ōzeki after the March 2020 tournament, and was a runner-up in his ōzeki debut in July 2020 and in January 2021.

In June 2021 Asanoyama was handed a one-year (six tournament) suspension for violating sumo protocols related to COVID-19. He returned to competition in the July 2022 tournament having been demoted to the third-lowest rank of sandanme. After returning to the top division in May 2023, he was sidelined again in July 2024 after tearing his left ACL in competition. He returned again to the top division for the January 2026 tournament, becoming the first wrestler in sumo history to fall from the top division to sandanme and then return to the top division two separate times.

== Background and early career ==
After initially showing more interest and aptitude for handball, Ishibashi began to concentrate on sumo in Junior High School. He took part in the national championships in his third year but sustained an elbow injury which led to him considering quitting the sport. He then attended Toyama Commercial High School and was persuaded to persevere by the school's sumo director. After competing successfully in High School tournaments he won a place at Kindai University where he studied Economics. He won seven college titles and reached the top four in all-Japan Sumo Championships.

In 2016 Ishibashi joined the professional Takasago stable, bringing him under the tutelage of the former ōzeki Asashio. Like most new wrestlers he began his career under his family name.

As a University champion, Ishibashi was allowed to bypass the two lowest tiers of professional sumo and begin his career in the fourth sandanme division in March 2016. Three kachi-koshi (winning records) in his first three basho (tournaments) saw him promoted to the makushita division for September. Winning records in September and November were followed by a perfect 7–0 in January 2017 which earned him the divisional championship and promotion to the second division (jūryō). At this point he took the shikona (ring name) of Asanoyama. His promotion ensured that Takasago stable would once again have a sekitori, following the demotions of Asasekiryū and Asabenkei to makushita which had left the stable with no wrestlers in the top two divisions for the first time since 1878. Asanoyama revealed his determination to reach jūryō to honour the memory of his sumo coach at high school who had recently died of cancer, and that his resolve did not falter even though he lost two matches in November and had to wait for one more tournament to earn promotion.

In his jūryō debut in March 2017 Asanoyama recorded 10 wins to tie for the lead on the final day of the tournament but was beaten in a play-off by the much more experienced Toyohibiki. After 8 wins in May, he tied for the championship with 11 wins in July but again lost a play-off, this time to his near contemporary Daiamami. His efforts were enough to secure promotion to the top makuuchi division for the next tournament. He was the second sandanme tsukedashi entrant to reach makuuchi following Yutakayama.

== Makuuchi ==
In his first tournament in the top division Asanoyama was assigned the rank of maegashira 16. He stood at only 3–3 after Day 6 but then went on a five-match winning streak and was on the leaderboard towards the end of the tournament, trailing Gōeidō by just one win on Day 13. He finished with a 10–5 record and was awarded the Fighting Spirit Prize. After his final match Asanoyama commented, "I have fought with the spirit of a challenger over the 15 days and that has led to my finishing with double figures in wins. I am really happy about that." He was less successful in his second top division tournament, scoring only five wins against ten losses and barely avoiding demotion back to jūryō. In January 2018 he produced a 9–6 record from the rank of maegashira 16. In July he was on the leaderboard for much of the tournament and finished with an 11–4 record and a share of the Fighting Spirit prize. For the next few tournaments he remained in the middle of the maegashira ranks, mostly alternating between 8–7 and 7–8 records.

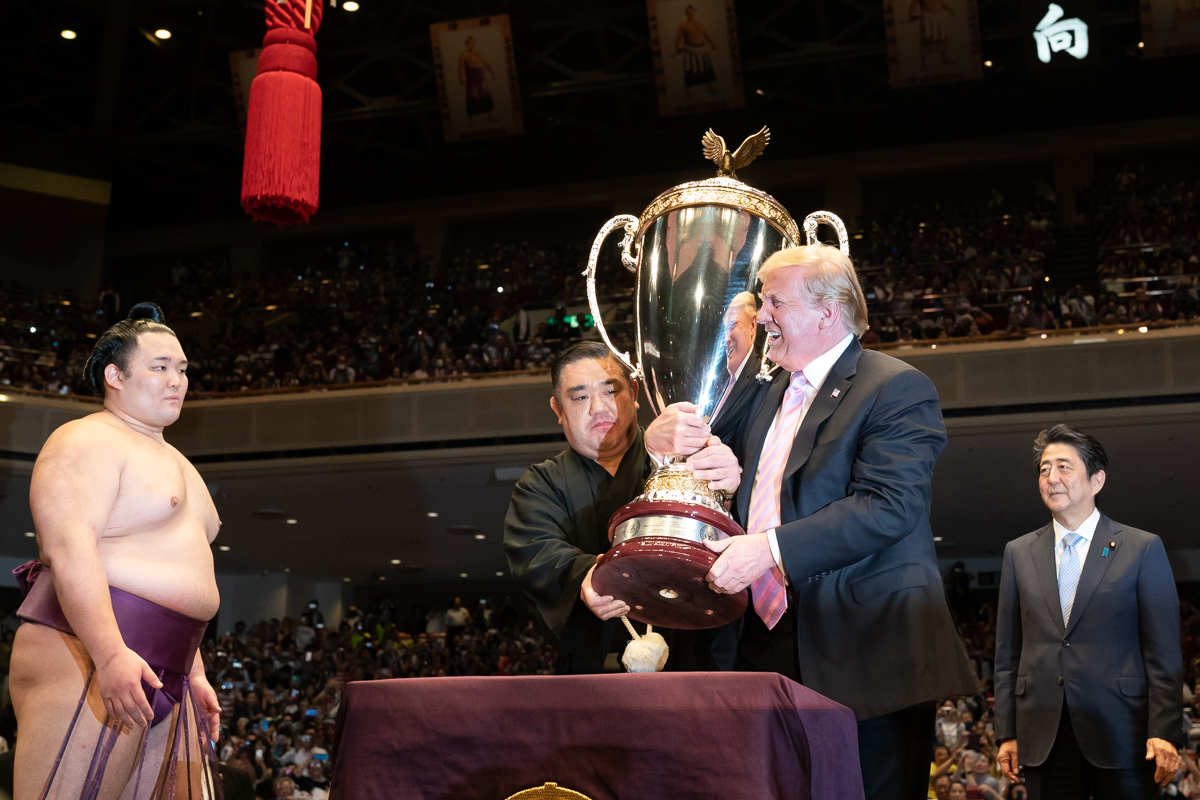
Asanoyama receives the President's Cup from Donald Trump

In the May 2019 tournament, the first to be held in the Reiwa era, he was the sole leader with ten wins and just one loss on Day 11. He lost his second bout of the tournament on Day 12, but regained the sole lead on Day 13 with a controversial win over Tochinoshin. He appeared to have hit the ground first, but the judges ruled that Tochinoshin's heel had touched out of bounds. By defeating Gōeidō on Day 14 he won the tournament after his only challenger Kakuryū was defeated by Tochinoshin, leaving Asanoyama two wins ahead with only one day to go. He was the first wrestler without previous san'yaku experience to win a yūshō since Sadanoyama in 1961. He lost his final day match to Mitakeumi to finish on a 12–3 record. In addition to the tournament championship he won special prizes for Outstanding Performance and Fighting Spirit and received the inaugural US President's Cup from President Donald Trump. Speaking to reporters the day after his victory Asanoyama said that he never imagined he could win the championship within three years of his professional debut but that the next tournament would be different and he would be seeking a winning record. He was the first wrestler from Toyama Prefecture to win a top division championship in 103 years, and 25,000 people attended a parade in his hometown on June 16. In the July 2019 tournament he just missed out on a san'yaku debut, instead being ranked at maegashira 1. He fell one win short of his goal of kachi-koshi with a 7–8 record. On the fifth day of the September tournament he earned his first kinboshi or gold star for a win over a yokozuna, against Kakuryū. He held a share of the tournament lead after Day 10, but lost both his bouts on Days 11 and 12 and finished with a 10–5 record. He was awarded his second Outstanding Performance Prize, for defeating Kakuryū and two ōzeki.

He made his san'yaku debut in November 2019, one of four komusubi on the banzuke in that tournament. He is the first komusubi from Takasago stable since Asasekiryū in 2006, the third post-World War II from Toyama Prefecture after Wakamiyama and Kotogaume, and the third from Kindai University after his stablemaster Asashio and Takarafuji. He was runner-up to Hakuhō with an 11–4 record, and won his first Technique Prize. He also finished 2019 with 55 top division wins, more than any other wrestler that year. He is the first ranked below yokozuna or ōzeki to achieve the most wins in a calendar year.

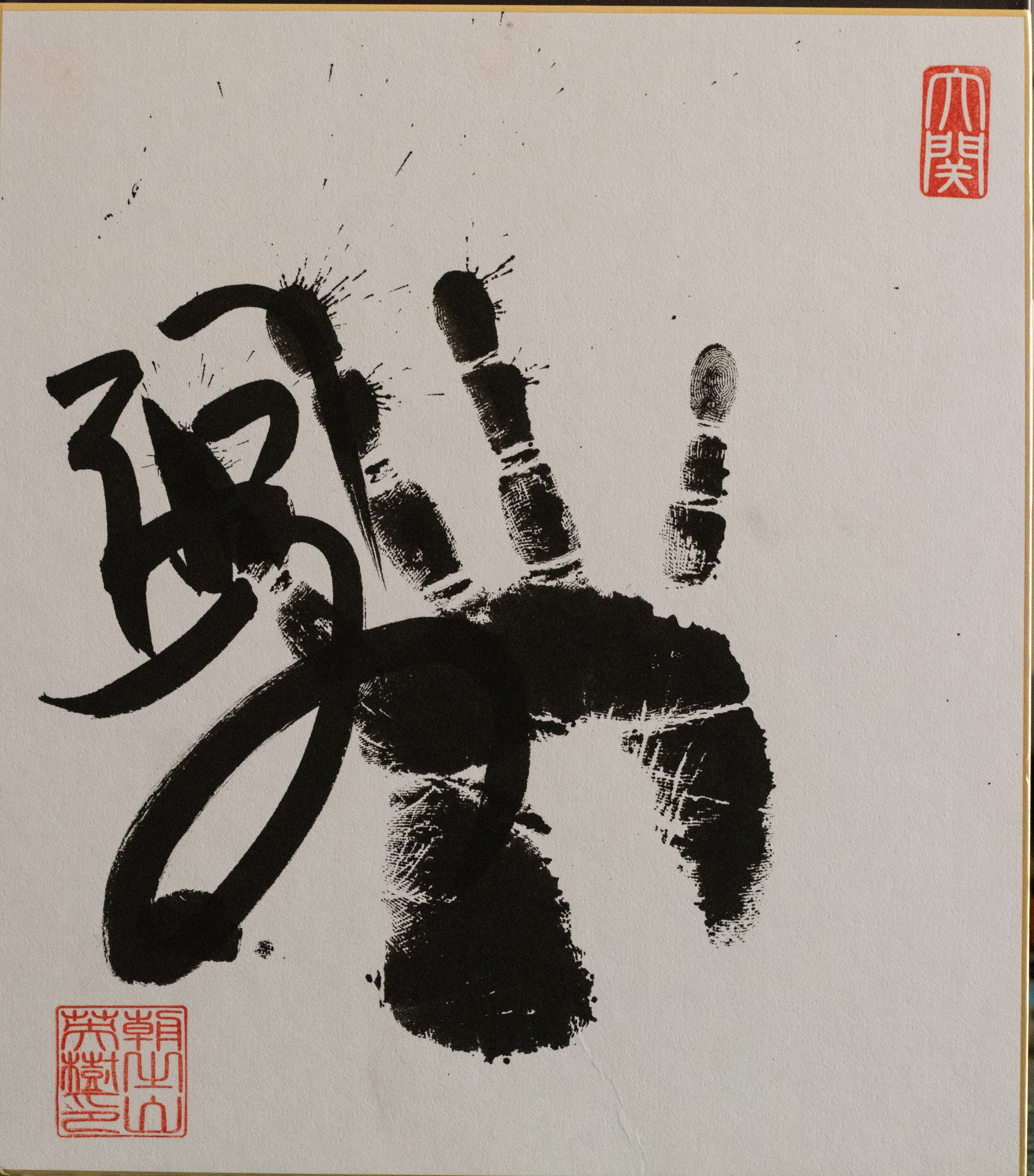
Asanoyama original ōzeki tegata (handprint and signature)

=== Promotion to ōzeki ===
In the January 2020 tournament Asanoyama made his debut at sekiwake and produced a 10–5 record. The demotion of Takayasu and the retirement of Gōeidō left only one ōzeki on the March banzuke for the first time in 38 years, and Asanoyama told a press conference on 24 February, "There is another spot available for ōzeki. I want to make the most of this opportunity." Asanoyama finished with an 11–4 record in the March tournament, good enough for the sumo advisory board to recommend his promotion to the ōzeki rank. The Japan Sumo Association officially promoted him on 25 March. He is the first ōzeki from Toyama Prefecture since the 22nd yokozuna Tachiyama made the rank 111 years earlier; Asanoyama said he hoped to reach his level, and also inspire youngsters from his prefecture to join professional sumo.

=== Ōzeki career ===
In his ōzeki debut in July 2020 Asanoyama was the tournament leader until Day 13 when he was defeated by former ōzeki Terunofuji. Asanoyama was unable to take advantage of Terunofuji's defeat the following day to Shōdai when he lost for the second day in a row, falling victim to Terutsuyoshi's ashitori leg grab. He finished the tournament runner-up on 12–3. He made a poor start to his September campaign, losing his first three matches, which led to him being criticized by former yokozuna and Takasago stable member Asashōryū. He then won ten in a row before being defeated by Shōdai and Takakeishō on the last two days to finish on 10–5. He withdrew from the November 2020 tournament on Day 3, due to a deltoid muscle injury to his right shoulder suffered on the opening day. This was the first time in his career that he had been forced to withdraw from a tournament. On his return to competition in the January 2021 tournament, he achieved a winning record to retain his ōzeki rank and ended as joint runner-up with fellow ōzeki Shōdai and sekiwake Terunofuji.

=== Investigation and suspension ===
Asanoyama withdrew from the May 2021 tournament after Day 11 when it emerged that he had broken COVID-19 protocols. The Sumo Association's director of communications, Shibatayama, said at the time that Asanoyama had initially denied the allegations, which were first reported by the Shūkan Bunshun magazine, but later admitted to them.

The investigation into the matter was handled by the Sumo Association's compliance committee, headed by Oguruma (former ōzeki Kotokaze). The committee found that Asanoyama had visited cabaret nightclubs ten times and dined out three times, all during a period when wrestlers were instructed not to go out for any non-essential reason. It was also discovered that a 44-year-old reporter for Sports Nippon who accompanied Asanoyama during his outings conspired with him to cover up the incidents to investigators, with Asanoyama found to have destroyed evidence by deleting the reporter's text messages from his smartphone. When initially asked by investigators about the violations, Asanoyama claimed to have been seeking medical treatment, accompanied by the Sports Nippon reporter.

The compliance committee's report noted that Asanoyama had "seriously tarnished his dignity as an ōzeki." An extraordinary session of the full Sumo Association body was scheduled on 11 June for final disposition. Prior to the meeting, it was revealed that Asanoyama had submitted his resignation two days after he withdrew from the May 2021 tournament.

The Sumo Association issued Asanoyama a one-year (six tournament) suspension from sumo and a 50% salary cut for six months, with his retirement papers held in case he causes any further trouble. Oguruma was quoted as saying that Asanoyama "...should have served as a role model for other sumo wrestlers" as an ōzeki, adding that the punishment would not have been as harsh if he admitted to what he did in the first place. Asanoyama appeared at the meeting and apologized to the directors, saying that he lied because he feared what would happen if he had been more straightforward about it.

As his suspension is treated as absences on the banzuke, Asanoyama lost his ōzeki title and fell out of the sekitori ranks completely. In addition to Asanoyama's punishment, his stablemaster Takasago (former sekiwake Asasekiryū) was issued a 20% salary cut for three months. Sports Nippon later announced that the reporter that dined with Asanoyama had been dismissed following an internal inquiry. Asanoyama's former stablemaster Nishikijima (former ōzeki Asashio IV) submitted his resignation after he was found to have violated COVID restrictions by inviting Asanoyama for dinner and drinks with his family and acquaintances.

One month after his suspension was finalized, Asanoyama, his stablemaster and six lower-ranked rikishi in Takasago stable all tested positive for COVID-19.

=== First return to competition ===
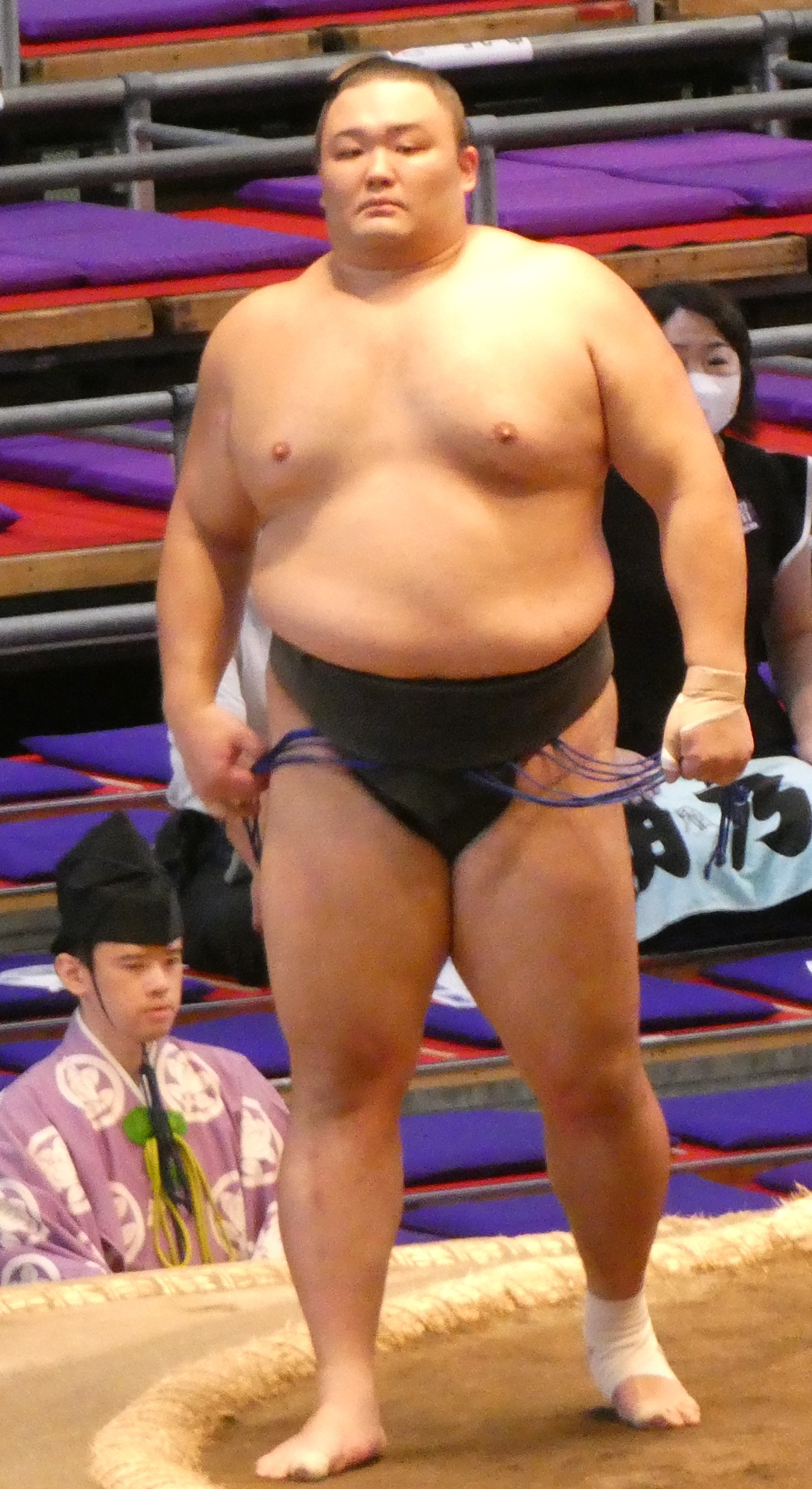
In his comeback tournament in July 2022

Asanoyama was demoted to the third-lowest division at the rank of west sandanme 22 for the July 2022 tournament in Nagoya following the completion of his six-tournament suspension. He changed his ring name for his return to competition, switching the first name of Hideki to his real given name of Hiroki. Speaking ahead of Asanoyama's return, his stablemaster Takasago said Asanoyama had not received any special treatment since his fall from the sekitori ranks and had been required to do chores around the stable with the other low-ranking wrestlers. At a training session in June, he won nine out of twelve bouts against jūryō ranked Asanowaka.

Asanoyama won his opening match on the second day of the July 2022 basho, which marked his first professional sumo contest in 418 days. He would go on to win the sandanme championship with a perfect record of 7 wins.

In September 2022 he was ranked at makushita 15 and would have been promoted back to jūryō for November if he had produced another perfect score, but he lost one of his seven matches. At the November tournament in Kyūshū he lost his sixth bout against makushita veteran Tamashōhō and finished again at 6–1. Following the November basho the Sumo Association announced that Asanoyama would be promoted to jūryō, returning to sekitori for the January 2023 tournament. Asanoyama won this tournament with a 14–1 record. His only defeat was to Daishōhō on Day 11. After his victory Asanoyama said his goals for 2023 were to return to makuuchi and reach sanyaku by the end of the year. Asanoyama rose to the top of the jūryō division at #1 East for the March 2023 tournament. On Day 5 he defeated Tochinoshin in the first ever match between two former ōzeki to take place in jūryō.

Asanoyama would be back in the top makuuchi division at the May 2023 tournament for the first time since his suspension, having been promoted to maegashira 14. He stayed in the championship race until Day 13 when he was defeated by Yokozuna Terunofuji, the eventual top division champion of this basho. He finished the May 2023 tournament with a runner-up record of 12-3. This was his first runner-up performance in the top division since January 2021. At the July 2023 tournament he secured four wins before having to withdraw after partially tearing his left bicep in his loss to Hōshōryū on Day 7. It was his first absence from a tournament since concluding his suspension. Nevertheless, Asanoyama decided to return to competition on the twelfth day, his return match being against maegashira Tobizaru. During the jungyō of August, Asanoyama also withdrew from the tour to heal his biceps injury.

During the October tour, Asanoyama also suffered an injury, the medical report following his injury citing a "torn left calf muscle." Eleven days before the start of the November tournament, however, he reaffirmed his desire to take part in the competition and reach the san'yaku ranks, for the first time since his suspension, for the January tournament. Moreover, on 3 November, Asanoyama was also bereaved by the loss of his former master Asashio IV, who had raised him to the rank of ōzeki, having died at the age of 67. Asanoyama announced that he would be absent at the start of the November tournament because of slow recovery of his calf muscle. He entered competition on Day 8, winning his first match of the tournament over ōzeki Takakeishō.

Asanoyama was the undefeated sole leader after seven days of the January 2024 tournament, but in his loss to Tamawashi on Day 8 he appeared to twist his right ankle. Asanoyama withdrew from the tournament the following day. His stablemaster Takasago indicated that he would see how Asanoyama's ankle improved, with a possibility that he could return to competition. Despite having withdrawn from the tournament (and conceding a default victory to Ōnoshō in the process), Asanoyama returned to the tournament on Day 13 and immediately secured a kachi-koshi score with an eighth victory over Gōnoyama. At the following tournament, in March 2024, Asanoyama, then at the top of the rank-and-file wrestling ranks, scored an eighth victory over Komusubi Abi, raising hopes in the press of a repromotion in the san'yaku ranks for the May tournament; his first since his demotion from sekiwake after the September 2021 tournament. On Day 14, he defeated the tournament's sole leader, Takerufuji, handing him his second defeat to record a ninth victory. With his score at 9–6, Asanoyama commented on his return to the san'yaku ranks for the first time since his return to the top division with some concern, notably emphasizing that being now older he would have to rely on his experience and technique to be on equal footing with younger and physically stronger wrestlers.

=== Knee injuries, demotion and second return ===
Asanoyama first return to san'yaku status was made official at the banzuke unveiling for the May 2024 tournament. Near the end of the spring regional tour, however, Asanoyama suffered a MCL injury to his right knee. The diagnosis of the injury at a hospital in Chiba Prefecture indicated that it would need about three weeks of treatment. With 2 1/2 weeks until the start of the next grand tournament, Asanoyama told reporters that he had to start treatment immediately. The severity of his injury was all the more worrying as Asanoyama made his return at the top of makuuchi, even declaring that it would be difficult for him to adapt, as this was his first leg injury. On May 8, it was announced that Asanoyama would not be taking part in the tournament, as he declared that he was unable to compete in training and his doctors warned him that his injury would worsen if he took part in the tournament. At the start of the tournament it was reported that he would need about three more weeks of treatment.

On Day 4 of the July 2024 tournament Asanoyama, with three wins under his belt, fell awkwardly in his bout against Ichiyamamoto. Unable to stand on his own, he was taken away from the ring in a wheelchair and went to a local hospital. He was later diagnosed with a tear of his left ACL. Stablemaster Takasago said that Asanoyama would consult with the doctors on a recommended course of action, though Takasago suggested that he have surgery. Asanoyama's medical certificate indicated he would need two months of treatment, but Takasago predicted that he would need more than half a year to fully recover and return to competition. This would likely drop him out of salaried status once again, possibly to the third-lowest sandanme division by the time he would be able to return. On 23 October, it was confirmed that Asanoyama was not planning to compete until March 2025, mentioning his intention to become the first wrestler in sumo history to be demoted to sandanme and regain his makuuchi status twice.

After returning in March 2025 and winning the sandanme championship with a perfect record, Asanoyama was promoted to sekitori status again for the September 2025 tournament. During this tournament, he maintained a record of three losses, narrowly missing out on the championship, which was won by his stablemate Asahakuryū, who had been his tsukebito (assistant). At the November 2025 tournament, Asanoyama solidified his chances for a return to the makuuchi division by winning 12 bouts for the second consecutive tournament. He was officially promoted to the top division for the January 2026 tournament, becoming the first wrestler in sumo history to be demoted from makuuchi to sandanme and then return to makuuchi on two separate occasions. Upon this promotion, Asanoyama told reporters that he wanted to reach the san'yaku ranks and aim for ōzeki with a "renewed spirit," adding it was truly his "last chance."

Asanoyama finished with winning records in both the January 2026 and March 2026 tournaments. At the May 2026 tournament, Asanoyama was in contention for the championship, though he was eliminated from the race when he suffered a fourth defeat to maegashira Hakunofuji. Asanoyama appeared to suffer an injury to his left foot in this match, and he withdrew from the tournament the next day one win short of a winning record. There was a possibility of him returning to the tournament to attempt and secure his winning record.

During the September 2026 tournament, Asanoyama remained among the top wrestlers in the championship, though he trailed the leader, Ōnosato, by two losses. On the fourteenth day, he suffered his fourth loss to Fujinokawa, effectively eliminating him from the title race. However, it was announced that, based on his performance, Asanoyama would receive a special prize for Fighting Spirit, provided he won his final match against Yoshinofuji. If he were to receive this prize, Asanoyama would rank among the top 10 wrestlers with the longest gap between two special prizes, having won this award 40 tournaments after his previous one.

During the November 2026 tournament, Asanoyama was named a potential recipient for a Fighting Spirit prize if he won his eleventh match. Asanoyama was defeated by Kinbōzan and did not win the prize.

== Fighting style ==
Asanoyama has shown a preference for yotsu techniques which involve grasping his opponent's mawashi or belt. His most common kimarite or winning move is yorikiri, the force-out. His preferred grip is migi-yotsu, a right arm inside and left hand outside position, although in the run-up to the March 2020 tournament he worked on obtaining a left hand inside grip as well.

== Career record ==
Asanoyama Hiroki
Year	January Hatsu basho, Tokyo	March Haru basho, Osaka	May Natsu basho, Tokyo	July Nagoya basho, Nagoya	September Aki basho, Tokyo	November Kyūshū basho, Fukuoka
2016	x	Sandanme tsukedashi #100; 5–2	East Sandanme #66; 6–1	West Sandanme #11; 6–1	West Makushita #36; 6–1	East Makushita #14; 5–2
2017	West Makushita #7; 7–0; Champion	East Jūryō #12; 10–5–P	East Jūryō #7; 8–7	West Jūryō #5; 11–4–P	East Maegashira #16; 10–5; F	West Maegashira #11; 5–10
2018	West Maegashira #16; 9–6	West Maegashira #13; 8–7	West Maegashira #12; 7–8	West Maegashira #13; 11–4; F	West Maegashira #5; 7–8	West Maegashira #5; 6–9
2019	West Maegashira #8; 8–7	East Maegashira #8; 7–8	West Maegashira #8; 12–3; FO	East Maegashira #1; 7–8	West Maegashira #2; 10–5; O★	West Komusubi #2; 11–4; T
2020	East Sekiwake #1; 10–5	East Sekiwake #1; 11–4	West Ōzeki #1; Tournament Cancelled; State of Emergency; 0–0–0	West Ōzeki #1; 12–3	East Ōzeki #1; 10–5	West Ōzeki #1; 1–2–12
2021	East Ōzeki #2; 11–4	West Ōzeki #1; 10–5	East Ōzeki #1; 7–5–3	West Ōzeki #2; Suspended; 0–0–15	East Sekiwake #2; Suspended; 0–0–15	West Maegashira #10; Suspended; 0–0–15
2022	West Jūryō #4; Suspended; 0–0–15	West Makushita #2; Suspended; 0–0–7	West Makushita #42; Suspended; 0–0–7	West Sandanme #22; 7–0; Champion	East Makushita #15; 6–1	East Makushita #4; 6–1
2023	West Jūryō #12; 14–1; Champion	East Jūryō #1; 13–2	East Maegashira #14; 12–3	East Maegashira #4; 8–4–3	West Maegashira #2; 9–6	East Maegashira #1; 4–4–7
2024	West Maegashira #7; 9–3–3	West Maegashira #1; 9–6	East Komusubi #1; Sat out due to injury 0–0–15	East Maegashira #12; 3–2–10	West Jūryō #3; Sat out due to injury 0–0–15	East Makushita #1; Sat out due to injury 0–0–7
2025	West Makushita #41; Sat out due to injury 0–0–7	West Sandanme #21; 7–0; Champion	West Makushita #14; 6–1	West Makushita #1; 5–2	West Jūryō #13; 12–3	West Jūryō #4; 12–3
2026	East Maegashira #16; 9–6	West Maegashira #12; 8–7	East Maegashira #10; 7–5–3	East Maegashira #10; 9–6	East Maegashira #6; 10–5	East Maegashira #1; 10–5
Record given as wins–losses–absences Top division champion Top division runner-up Retired Non-participation Jūryō Lower divisions Sanshō key: F=Fighting spirit; O=Outstanding performance; T=Technique Also shown: ★=Kinboshi; P=Playoff(s); Divisions: Makuuchi — Jūryō — Makushita — Sandanme — Jonidan — Jonokuchi Makuuchi ranks: Yokozuna — Ōzeki — Sekiwake — Komusubi — Maegashira

== See also ==
- Glossary of sumo terms
- List of active sumo wrestlers
- List of active gold star earners
- List of active special prize winners
- List of sumo record holders
- List of sumo top division champions
- List of sumo top division runners-up
- List of sumo second division champions
- List of ōzeki
