= Ijun =

Religion

Ijun (いじゅん) is a Shinto-Ryukyuan-derived religion founded by Takayasu Ryūsen (1934-) in Okinawa. This modern religion started in 1972 and in 1980 became registered under the Religious Corporations Law (Shūkyō Hōjinhō). In the same year, the movement joined the Shinshūren (Federation of Japanese New Religions) and started its overseas activities.

Ijun is based in traditional Okinawan animist and shamanistic beliefs related to noro (i.e. nuru, an Okinawan term for female diviners/priestesses) and yuta (an Okinawan term for shamans). This movement, emphasizes the worship of the deity Kinmanmon, an Okinawan god and cosmic deity and describes the mysterious life force of the universe as an "internal power" (uchinaa power) comparable to Japanese Universal Ki and teaches that people must awaken to this power.

Ijun has most of its followers in Okinawa (Uchinaa), but it also has a temple in Yokohama and overseas temples in Taiwan and Hawaii.
