= Enhō Yūya =

Japanese sumo wrestler

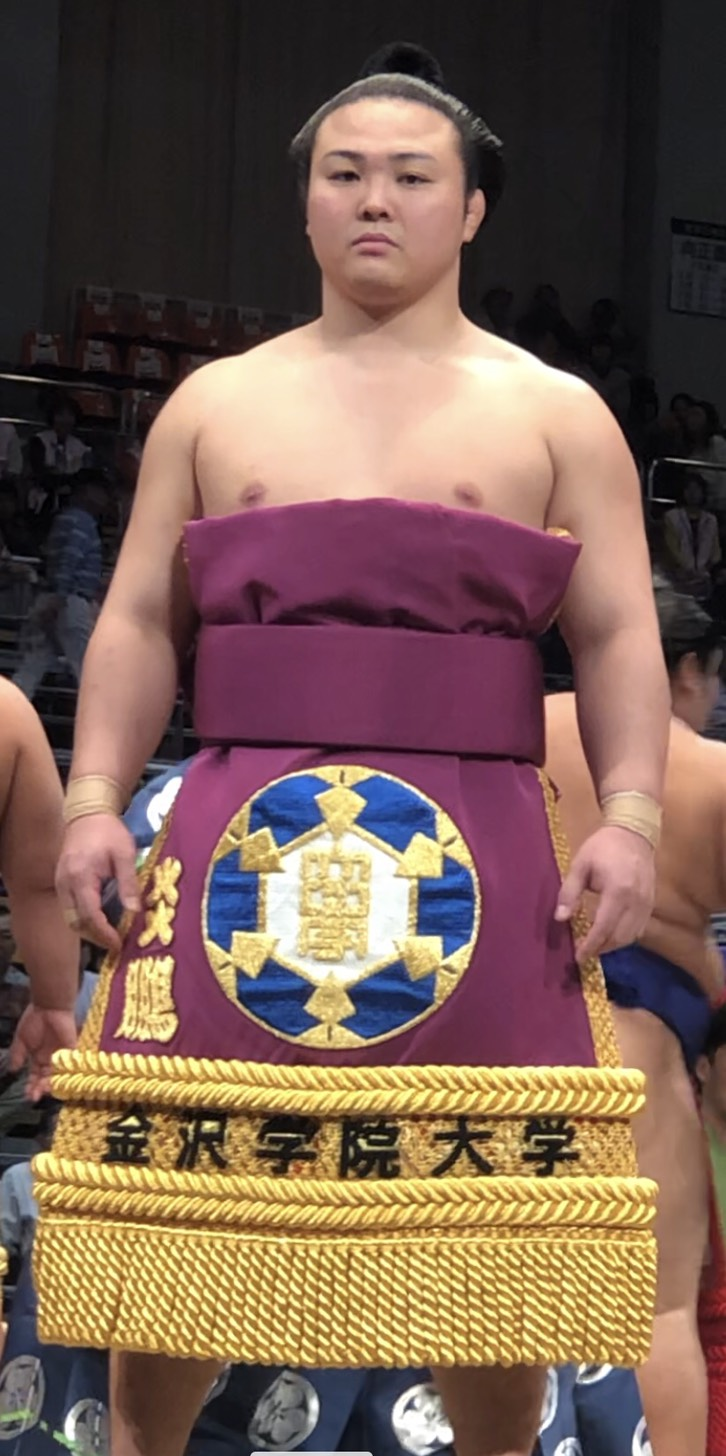
- Enhō in 2018

Personal information
- Native name: 炎鵬 友哉
- Born: Nakamura Yūya; 18 October 1994 (age 32) Kanazawa, Ishikawa Prefecture
- Height: 1.67 m (5 ft 5 1/2 in)
- Weight: 100.6 kg (222 lb)

Sport
- Sport: Sumo
- Rank: see below
- University team: Kanazawa Gakuin University
- Heya: Miyagino → Isegahama
- Debut: March 2017
- Highest rank: Maegashira 4 (March 2020)
- Championships: 1 Sandanme; 1 Jonidan; 1 Jonokuchi
- Special Prizes: 1 (Technique)
- Updated on March 2024

Enhō Yūya (Japanese: 炎鵬 友哉; born 18 October 1994 as Yūya Nakamura (中村 友哉)) is a Japanese professional sumo wrestler from Ishikawa Prefecture. He made his debut in March 2017 and was a member of Miyagino stable, under the guidance of former yokozuna Hakuhō, until his transfer to Isegahama stable in March 2024. His highest rank has been maegashira 4.

He is shorter and weighs significantly less than the vast majority of sumo wrestlers in the upper ranks, but has learned to use his small stature and size for maximum advantage, becoming known for toppling larger opponents. He has achieved one special prize for Technique.

== Early life and sumo background ==
Yūya Nakamura's father supported the family by working at a newspaper. Nakamura first started practicing sumo at the age of five, due to the influence of his older brother. In primary school he also was goal keeper for a school water polo team. At the area middle school, he was in the sumo club with the future Kagayaki. In his 3rd year, the team that he and future Kagayaki were members of took the team championship in the middle school prefectural tournament. Nakamura went on to Kanazawa Gakuin, a high school in his city. In his third year there he took the gold medal in the 2012 World Junior Sumo Championships in the lightweight division. He continued to Kanazawa Gakuin University and majored in sports medicine. In his first year, he was the champion of the West Japan New Student Athlete Sumo Tournament, and in his second and third years he won the World Amateur Sumo Championship two years in a row. In all, he acquired ten titles. Seriously interested in joining pro sumo, Nakamura was interviewed at a number of stables before graduating, and upon finishing university, he joined Miyagino stable.

== Career ==
=== Early career ===
Nakamura became an attendant and apprentice to yokozuna Hakuhō. Hakuhō chose the shikona Enhō for him, with "en" meaning fiery and "hō" meaning the Chinese mythological bird Peng, which is also the hō in the yokozuna's own name. He participated in maezumō in the March 2017 tournament, the same tournament where the future Wakatakakage made his debut as a sandanme tsukedashi. In the ceremony to debut new recruits on day 5, he wore the ceremonial apron, or kesho-mawashi, that his mentor Hakuhō was to start using from that day. However, Hakuhō ended up taking injury leave from the tournament on that same day.

Enhō's first pro tournament was the following May, starting at the bottom in the jonokuchi division. He was undefeated at 7–0 and took the championship. After this tournament he changed his second name in his full shikona title from his real name Yūya, to the name Akira. The name Akira honored his mentor at his dojo, named Akira, who died in a motorcycle accident nine years previously. In the following July tournament, he again had a perfect 7–0 record, and after a playoff took the championship. In the playoff, he beat former makuuchi wrestler Masunoyama who was in his first full tournament back in sumo, after a series of injury leaves. The win against Masunoyama was by shitatenage, which would become Enho's signature move. For the following September tournament, Enhō was promoted to the sandanme division and once again achieved a perfect 7–0, this time winning a playoff against Matsuda.

For the November tournament he was promoted to the makushita division. In this tournament Enhō was approaching an all-time record for consecutive wins from entry into sumo. However, in his first bout he lost to former komusubi Jōkōryū who himself holds the record for most consecutive wins upon entering sumo. Enhō ended the tournament with a 5–2 record. In the following January tournament, he was ranked at makushita 6 and achieved a 4–3 winning tournament. In most cases, at his rank with this record he would not have been promoted to the next division, the salaried ranks of jūryō. However, several jūryō wrestlers had records bad enough to be demoted from the division, and Enhō was promoted to fill one of the many open slots there. Not including makushita tsukedashi wrestlers, who are allowed to debut at a higher rank, this promotion meant Enhō tied the record for the fastest ever wrestler promoted to sekitori at six tournaments from his professional debut.

=== Promotion to Jūryō & Makuuchi ===
For this March 2018 tournament, Enhō was ranked at the bottom rung, at jūryō 14. As is often the case for a first timer in the salaried ranks, the wall was too high and he only managed a losing tournament record of 4–11 and was demoted back to makushita. After two strong performances of 5–2 in the upper ranks of makushita, Enhō was re-promoted to jūryō for the September tournament. In this tournament and the next two, he recorded three straight 9-6 records. In the following March tournament, he made the news after he came back from a near loss to Tokushōryū on day 9. Enhō's haunches came within 10 centimetres of the dohyō, before he bounced back, grabbing his opponent's legs with both hands and toppling him. This move, called ashitori would also become one of his regular techniques. He ended this tournament with an 8–7.

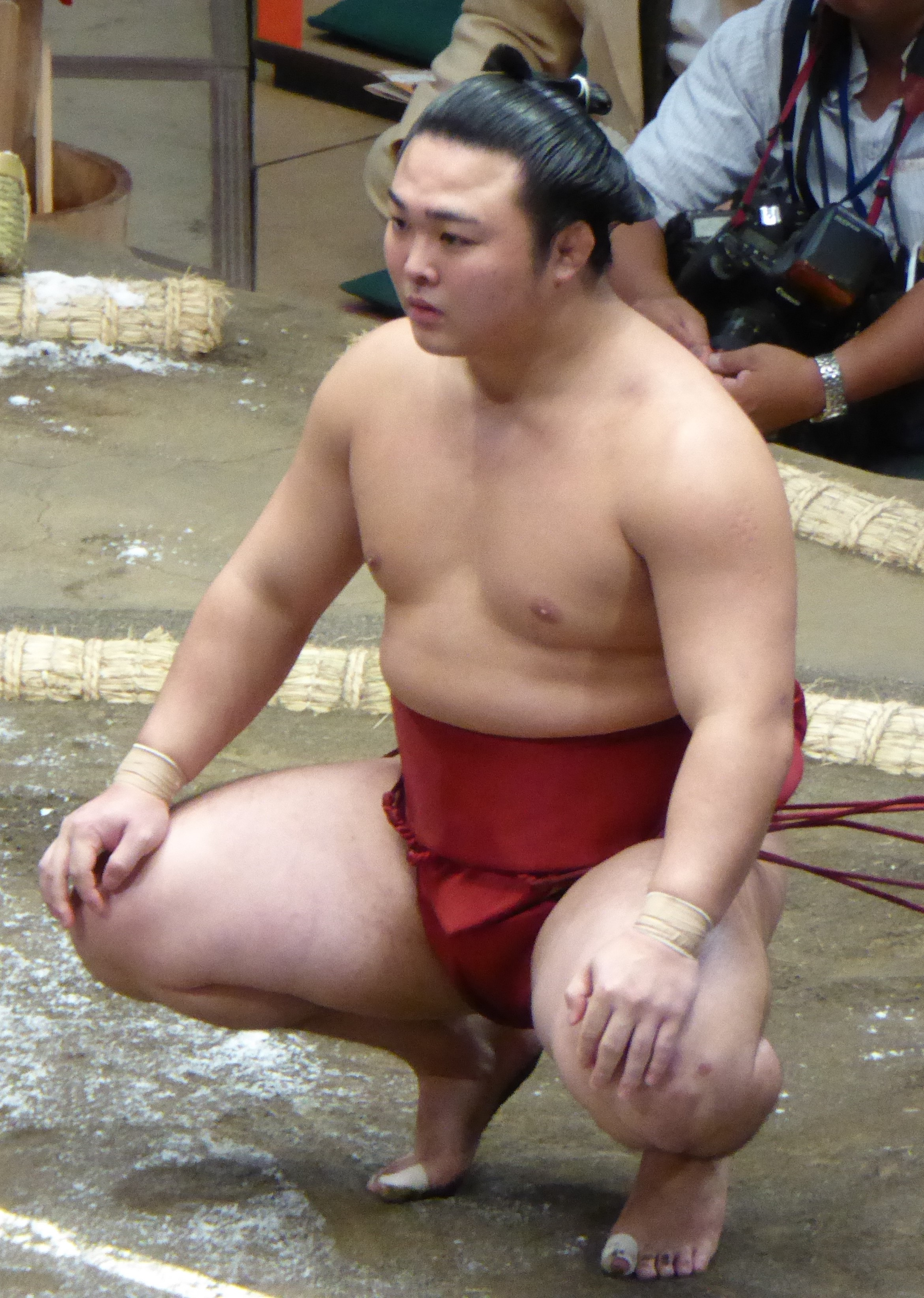
Enhō in September 2018

This record was enough for Enhō to be promoted to the makuuchi top division for the May 2019 tournament, the first tournament of the Reiwa era. He was the only wrestler on the banzuke listed as being under 100 kilograms (220 lb). He won his first top division bout on the opening day, and earned his first kenshōkin or cash prize provided by a sponsor of the match. As it was Mother's Day, Enhō gave the prize money to his mother. He again garnered attention when on day 4, he took down Daishōhō, who was almost twice his size, with his now well-known shitatenage. However, after reaching the cusp of a winning tournament on his top division debut on day 9 with a 7–2 record, he then lost six bouts in a row and ended up with a losing tournament. His losing streak was exacerbated by a thigh injury he suffered on Day 13. However, Enhō's record was enough to leave him ranked in makuuchi for the following July tournament. In this tournament, he again had a similar situation of having seven wins this time on day 10. He lost three bouts in a row after this, but finally managed his first top division winning tournament with a win versus veteran Myōgiryū on day 14. He would end the tournament with a 9–6 record and was also awarded the technique prize. After another 9–6 record in September, he reached maegashira 6 in the November 2019 tournament. It was during this period, however, that Enhō contracted a neck injury, causing him a great deal of pain and affecting his performance.

In the January 2020 tournament, fighting at a career-high rank of maegashira 5, he defeated ōzeki Gōeidō on Day 9. Since accurate records began in 1975, he is believed to be only the third wrestler under 100 kilos to defeat an ōzeki, after Chiyonofuji (against Asahikuni in May 1978) and Mainoumi (against Takanohana in July 1994 and Takanonami in July 1995). He finished with an 8–7 record, failing to win the match on the final day that would have given him the Technique Prize.

The rest of 2020 proved to be challenging for Enhō, however, as he posted four consecutive make-koshi, closing out the year with a 3–12 score in the Kyūshū tournament, resulting in his demotion to jūryō for the January 2021 tournament. He spoke of his disappointment at how 2020 had gone, saying he had been troubled by neck and wrist injuries and had not been able to do his own sumo. He said he was hoping to return to makuuchi in a single tournament, but after his stablemate Hakuhō tested positive for COVID-19, the whole of the Miyagino stable was forced to miss the January basho.

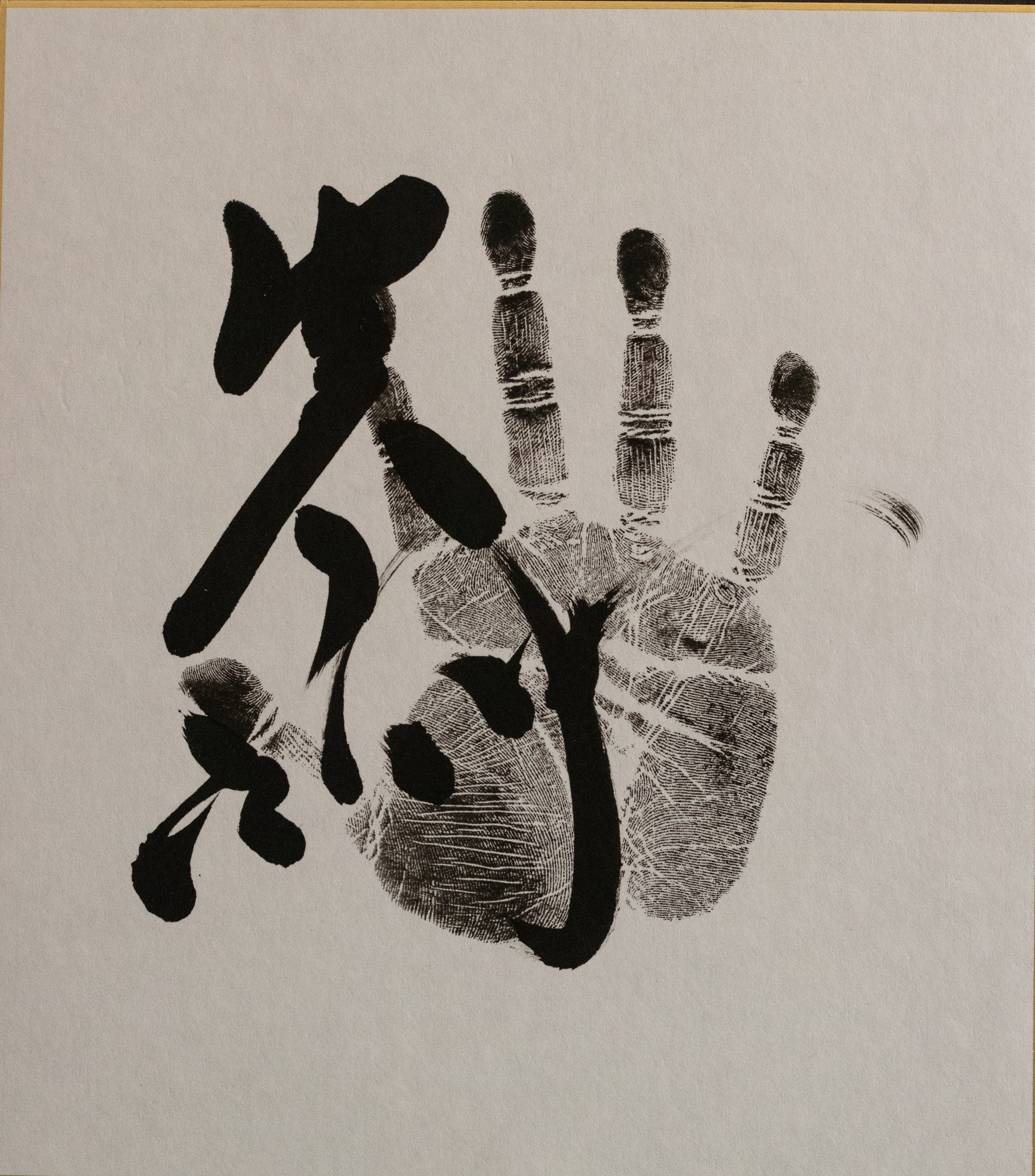
Enhō original tegata (handprint & signature)

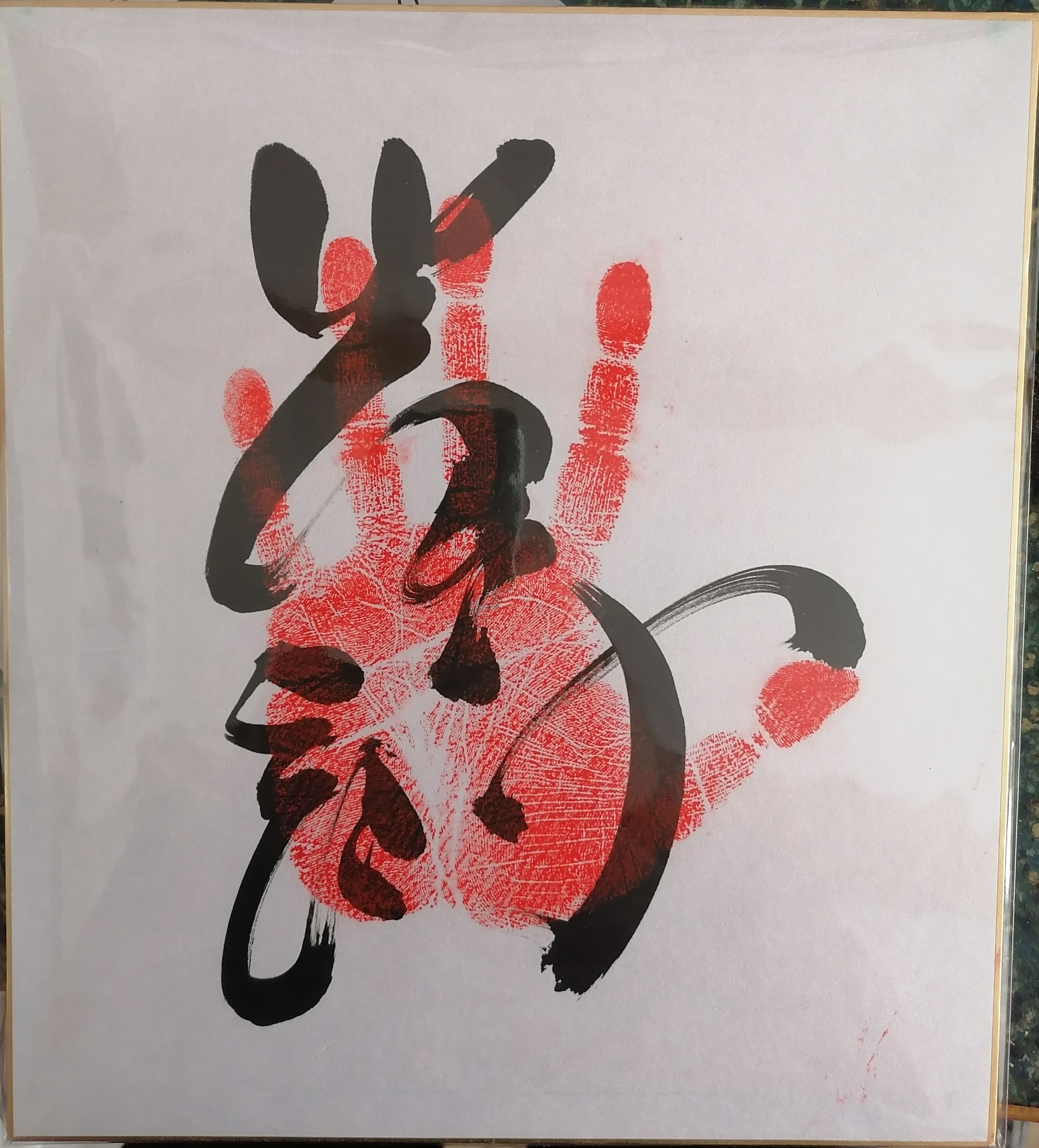
Enhō original tegata (handprint & signature)

Enhō said in February that his fitness was "more or less back to where it was." He returned to competition in March 2021, and on Day 8 faced Ura, another popular wrestler known for his unusual techniques, for the first time since they competed in school. Ura won the match after a judges conference. Enhō finished the tournament with a 9–6 score, his first winning record since January 2020, but it was not enough to earn promotion back to makuuchi. In May, ranked at Jūryō 1 East, he produced a disappointing 5–10 record. In July he suffered a suspected concussion in his Day 2 match with Takagenji and was prevented by the judges from taking part in the rematch. He was forced to forfeit and was taken away in a wheelchair, in accordance with recently introduced protocols.

Enhō was withdrawn from the September 2021 tournament along with the rest of his stable after two wrestlers tested positive for COVID-19. It is the second time this year that the stable has had to withdraw from a basho because of a coronavirus outbreak.

After falling to a 6–9 record at Jūryō 10 in the January 2022 tournament, Enhō told reporters that he felt a sense of crisis and would have to restart his training from scratch. Following several strong performances in March and November 2022 as well as March 2023, Enhō maintained his sekitori rank and occupied the top of the jūryō ranking between the March and May 2023 tournaments. Despite stating his ambition to return to makuuchi for the summer tournament, Enhō sustained several injuries during the year. In January, he continued to compete despite an orbital blowout fracture, forcing him to appear at Hakuhō's retirement ceremony with a blindfold. In April, he also revealed that he suffered from cervical disc herniation and cervical spinal canal stenosis, which required three weeks of treatment and forced him to abandon the spring jungyō. He later attributed his willingness to compete despite injury to his desire to protect his sekitori status despite the risk of worsening his physical condition.

=== Injuries & demotion ===
Enhō pulled out of the May 2023 tournament from Day 10 as he was diagnosed, after a checkup at a Tokyo hospital on 23 May, with a herniated disc in his neck, which will require approximately three months of treatment. This was his first career withdrawal through injury, as his two previous tournaments missed were due to COVID-19 protocols. On the first day of the July tournament, he announced his intention to make himself kyūjō for the tournament in order to heal this same injury. Later, the diagnosis of his injury changed and he was diagnosed as suffering from a spinal cord injury. Enhō resumed his training in August after being hospitalized for two weeks, a period during which he mentioned he couldn't get up or wash himself. For the September tournament of the same year, he however announced shortly after the release of the rankings his decision to sit out this tournament too. Faced with concerns about his condition following his injury, he nevertheless mentioned his intention to return to the ring, albeit on condition that he was fully fit.

Enhō mentioned his intention to return to competition for the March tournament, preparing his comeback by returning to Yūya as the given name in his shikona, which he had last used in 2017. Later in the month, however, it was announced that Enhō would not be able to return to competition on the advice of his doctor, having to sit out his fifth consecutive tournament. At the end of March 2024 it was confirmed that Enhō, and all the wrestlers and coaches from Miyagino stable, would be transferred to Isegahama stable for an indefinite period of time following the abuse case and the retirement of then-Miyagino's top ranker, Hokuseihō.

Enhō withdrew again before the May 2024 competition, marking his sixth straight absence from a full tournament. In June 2024 he made an appearance at the Ryōgoku Kokugikan, performing the yumitori-shiki (bow-twirling ceremony) for the retirement of Ishiura.

=== Return to competition ===
Enhō officially returned to competition at the July 2024 tournament, ranked in the lowest jonokuchi division. Despite losing his first match in over a year against debutant and eventual jonokuchi champion Shimizuumi, Enhō finished the tournament with a 6-1 record. He repeated the feat with another 6-1 in jonidan that September.

Despite missing out on his chance to win the sandanme championship two tournaments in a row, with a sixth victory (on the final day of the January 2025 tournament) Enhō was guaranteed a promotion to the makushita division. During this match, he had a notable clash with another featherweight, Yamato from Dewanoumi stable, a rare type of confrontation in sumo. In the first half of 2025, Enhō again rose to a position where he could regain his sekitori status, however recording a make-kochi score in the May tournament. Disappointed by his performance, he nevertheless commented on his satisfaction at having returned to this level of competition, wishing to dedicate his recovery to his loved ones and family who were still marked by the 2024 Noto earthquake. He was forced to withdraw from the July tournament due to injuries, further delaying his sekitori return.

Following the resignation and final retirement of his former master Miyagino (the 69th yokozuna Hakuhō) in June 2025, Enhō and the other members of the former Miyagino stable were instructed to remain under the tutelage of Isegahama stable. Commenting on the resignation of his master Hakuhō, Enhō said he was shocked by the decision and its suddenness. Upon the release of the January 2026 banzuke Enhō was the only wrestler out of those transferred to Isegahama that did not change his ring name to include the fuji (富士) characters (as is the stable's strong tradition), with Isegahama-oyakata (the former Terunofuji) stating that Enhō's wishes were respected.

In the January 2026 tournament, Enhō marked six consecutive wins from opening day. Because he was ranked makushita 11, seven wins would guarantee his repromotion to Jūryō. However, in his sixth match, Enhō appeared to injure his left ankle, limping back to the dressing room and declining interviews. Despite the injury, Enhō competed in the championship match on Day 13, losing to Nobehara. Because the loss had prevented a return to sekitori status, Enhō would describe it as the "most frustrating loss of his career." His record was good enough to have him promoted to makushita 4 for the March tournament, his highest rank since his comeback.

=== Repromotion to Jūryō ===
At the March 2026 tournament, ranked at makushita 4, Enhō started strong, losing only to Okaryu. On Day 9, he once again faced Nobehara, who had beaten him for the championship in the previous tournament. Enhō won this match with a shitatenage, securing a winning record and bringing him even closer to his goal of a sekitori return. On Day 11, Enhō fought Kōtokuzan, who was ranked in jūryō. This was Enhō's first time fighting in the jūryō division since 2023. Enhō won the match to obtain a fifth victory of the tournament, making a return to salaried status highly likely. On March 25, a few days after the tournament ended, Enhō's return to jūryō was made official for the May tournament. This would mean that Enhō would fight in jūryō again for the first time since May 2023. It would also fulfill the requirement of 30 tournaments ranked as a sekitori required to become a toshiyori after retiring. This promotion also marks the first time in the history of sumo that a former makuuchi wrestler has returned to sekitori status after being demoted to the jonokuchi division.

At the May 2026 tournament, Enhō unveiled a new wisteria mawashi inspired by former komusubi Mainoumi, who was another popular small wrestler. Enhō defeated Tochitaikai on Day 1, which was his first win in the jūryō division since the final day of the March 2023 tournament, a span of 1,141 days.

== Fighting style ==
Enhō is about 50 kilograms (110 lb) lighter and 15 cm (6 in) shorter than the average for the top makuuchi division. Due to his small size he relies on speed and technique to outwit his opponents. He is known for coming in very low at the tachi-ai or initial charge and attempting to grab his opponent's mawashi with an inside left hand grip (hidari-yotsu). His favourite winning kimarite is shitatenage or underarm throw. In addition, more than a third of his wins come from either leg grabs or pulling underarm throw (shitatedashinage), when the average for a typical wrestler is just two percent. However his lack of weight means he can also easily be thrown, shoved or picked up and placed out of the ring, making his matches unpredictable and popular with audiences.

== Career record ==
Enhō Yūya
Year	January Hatsu basho, Tokyo	March Haru basho, Osaka	May Natsu basho, Tokyo	July Nagoya basho, Nagoya	September Aki basho, Tokyo	November Kyūshū basho, Fukuoka
2017	x	(Maezumō)	East Jonokuchi #9; 7–0; Champion	East Jonidan #10; 7–0–P; Champion	West Sandanme #18; 7–0–P; Champion	West Makushita #14; 5–2
2018	East Makushita #6; 4–3	West Jūryō #14; 4–11	East Makushita #6; 5–2	West Makushita #2; 5–2	West Jūryō #13; 9–6	West Jūryō #10; 9–6
2019	East Jūryō #8; 9–6	West Jūryō #2; 8–7	West Maegashira #14; 7–8	West Maegashira #14; 9–6; T	West Maegashira #11; 9–6	West Maegashira #6; 8–7
2020	West Maegashira #5; 8–7	East Maegashira #4; 6–9	East Maegashira #6; Tournament Cancelled; State of Emergency; 0–0–0	East Maegashira #6; 5–10	East Maegashira #9; 6–9	West Maegashira #11; 3–12
2021	East Jūryō #3; Sat out due to COVID rules 0–0–15	East Jūryō #4; 9–6	East Jūryō #1; 5–10	East Jūryō #5; 4–11	East Jūryō #11; Sat out due to COVID rules 0–0–15	East Jūryō #11; 8–7
2022	West Jūryō #10; 6–9	West Jūryō #11; 10–5	East Jūryō #7; 6–9	West Jūryō #8; 8–7	West Jūryō #7; 6–9	East Jūryō #11; 10–5
2023	West Jūryō #4; 7–8	West Jūryō #5; 9–6	West Jūryō #3; 0–10–5	West Makushita #1; Sat out due to injury 0–0–7	West Makushita #41; Sat out due to injury 0–0–7	East Sandanme #22; Sat out due to injury 0–0–7
2024	East Sandanme #83; Sat out due to injury 0–0–7	East Jonidan #54; Sat out due to injury 0–0–7	East Jonidan #100; Sat out due to injury 0–0–7	West Jonokuchi #13; 6–1	West Jonidan #31; 6–1	West Sandanme #56; 6–1
2025	East Sandanme #4; 6–1	West Makushita #30; 6–1	West Makushita #10; 3–4	East Makushita #16; 2–2–3	East Makushita #31; 5–2	West Makushita #17; 5–2
2026	East Makushita #11; 6–1	East Makushita #4; 5–2	West Jūryō #14; 8–7	West Jūryō #11; 8–7	East Jūryō #9; 7–8	East Jūryō #10; 11–4
Record given as wins–losses–absences Top division champion Top division runner-up Retired Non-participation Jūryō Lower divisions Sanshō key: F=Fighting spirit; O=Outstanding performance; T=Technique Also shown: ★=Kinboshi; P=Playoff(s); Divisions: Makuuchi — Jūryō — Makushita — Sandanme — Jonidan — Jonokuchi Makuuchi ranks: Yokozuna — Ōzeki — Sekiwake — Komusubi — Maegashira

== See also ==
- Glossary of sumo terms
- List of active sumo wrestlers
- List of active special prize winners
- List of sumo record holders
