= Takayasu =

Takayasu is both a Japanese surname and a masculine Japanese given name.

== Surname ==
- Mikito Takayasu (高安 右人, 1860–1938), Japanese ophthalmologist
- Takayasu Akira (髙安 晃, born 1990), Japanese sumo wrestler
- Takayasu Ryūsen (高安 六郎, born 1934), founder of the Okinawan Ijun religion
- Takayuki Takayasu (高安 孝幸, born 2001), Japanese footballer

== Given name ==
- Takayasu Fukuda (福田 貴泰, born 1982), Japanese professional wrestler.
- Takayasu Kawai (河合 崇泰, born 1977), Japanese footballer
- Takayasu Usui (臼井 孝康), Japanese voice actor

== See also ==
- Takayasu's arteritis, a disorder of the aorta
