= Daishōhō Kiyohiro =

Mongolian sumo wrestler

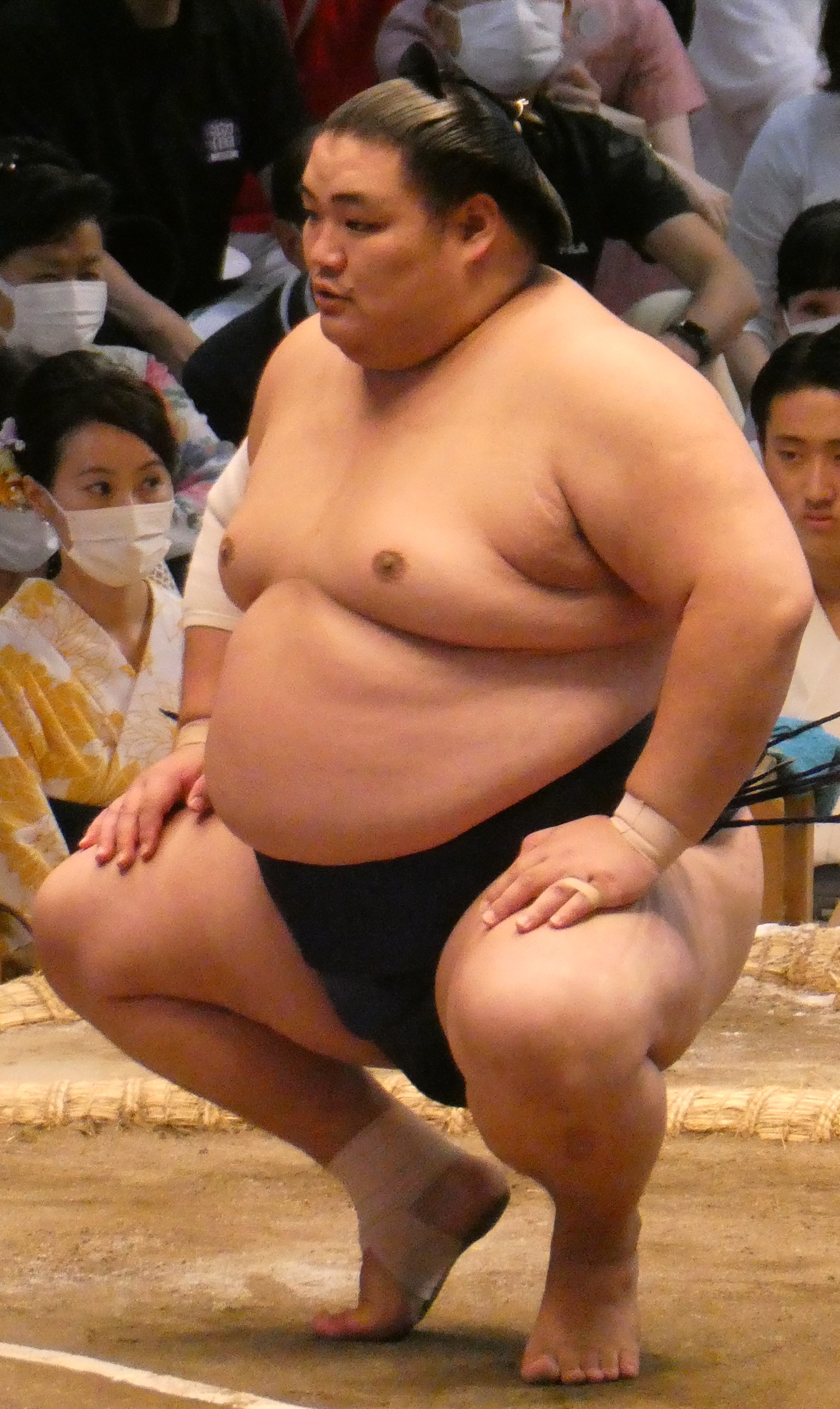
- Daishōhō in 2022

Personal information
- Native name: 大翔鵬 清洋
- Born: Chimidregzen Shijirbayar; August 28, 1994 (age 32) Ulaanbaatar, Mongolia
- Height: 1.85 m (6 ft 1 in)
- Weight: 191 kg (421 lb; 30 st 1 lb)

Sport
- Sport: Sumo
- Retired: February 2026
- Heya: Oitekaze
- Record: 417-433-2
- Debut: March 2013
- Highest rank: Maegashira 9 (July, 2019)
- Championships: 1 (Jonidan)
- Updated on February 13, 2026

Daishōhō Kiyohiro (Japanese: 大翔鵬 清洋; born August 28, 1994 as Chimidregzen Shijirbayar (Mongolian: Чимэдрэгзэнгийн Шижирбаяр)) is a Mongolian former professional sumo wrestler from Ulaanbaatar. He began his professional sumo career in 2013 at the age of eighteen and retired in February 2026. He wrestled for Oitekaze stable and his highest rank was maegashira 9.

== Early life and education ==
Shijirbayar spent his childhood in Ulaanbaatar and was a good student, but was sent to Japan to study after his fourth grade year, with his mother wishing for him to get a better education. While at this new school he discovered sumo and started wrestling. After showing an aptitude for sumo, by junior high school he was asked by fellow Mongolian rikishi Senshō to join Shikihide stable but chose to stay in school. In high school he was introduced to Oitekaze Oyakata who then took him into Oitekaze stable. His shikona of Daishōhō was derived from his stablemaster, with the hō kanji coming from yokozuna Taihō and Hakuhō.

== Career ==
Shijirbayar entered professional sumo in 2013, debuting in the March 2013 tournament. After starting off strong with a 6–1 in jonokuchi, followed by winning the jonidan division with a perfect 7–0 record, a subsequent 2–5 meant a first make-koshi losing record. Within two additional tournaments in sandanme, he found himself in makushita, where he remained for 16 basho before gaining sekitori status by being promoted to the jūryō division after the September 2016 tournament. He told reporters when his promotion was announced that he looked up to yokozuna Kakuryū as a role model, and that he simply hoped to get a kachi-koshi or winning record in his jūryō debut. However, in the event Daishōhō fell short of that with a 5–10 record in November 2016, and he was immediately demoted back to makushita. After a year in makushita, he earned promotion back to jūryō for the January 2018 tournament. He was able to remain in the division this time, recording six straight winning records to rise to Jūryō 1 by January 2019. He secured another 8–7 record in January, and won promotion to the top makuuchi division for the first time at the rank of maegashira 16. He became the 25th Mongolian to be promoted to makuuchi, and alongside Tomokaze and Terutsuyoshi it marked the first time since May 2013 that three wrestlers had made their top division debuts simultaneously.

In the March 2019 tournament in Osaka Daishoho fell just short of a winning record with seven wins against eight losses. However he remained in the top division at the same rank when the banzuke was released for the May 2019 tournament. In this tournament he secured his first winning record in the top division of 9–6, and was promoted to his highest rank to date of maegashira 9 for the July 2019 tournament. He lost to Enhō on the final day to fall to a 6–9 record in July, and a disappointing 5–10 score in September saw him fall to maegashira 15 for the November tournament.

Daishōhō lost his top division status after the November 2019 tournament. After the September 2020 tournament he was demoted from jūryō to makushita. After three tournaments in makushita he returned to the jūryō division after the March 2021 tournament. He returned to the top division in March 2023. In August of the same year, he was the heaviest makuuchi wrestler at 198 kg (437 lb), just behind Mitoryū who was the heaviest active sekitori.

Daishōhō announced his retirement in February 2026, just after a final tournament in the sandanme division where he had recorded a negative score. At his retirement press conference, he told reporters that during the November 2025 tournament he had aggravated a back injury that he suffered in January of that year, and decided to retire after his back was not getting better. He will not remain with the Sumo Association as a coach, saying that he intended to remain in Japan and work as an importer and seller of Mongolian clothing and products through a company run by his Japanese wife.

In July 2026, Daishōhō signed a non-exclusive representation agreement with the sumo entertainment agency Sumo Man.

Daishōhō's retirement ceremony was held at the Ryōgoku Kokugikan on October 4, 2026, with approximately 130 people in attendance.

== Personal life ==
Daishōhō is married to a Japanese wife and has three sons. As of his retirement in February 2026, he was intending to seek permanent residency in Japan.

== Fighting style ==
Daishōhō was a yotsu-sumo wrestler, preferring grappling techniques to pushing and thrusting. He used a migi-yotsu grip on the mawashi, with his right hand inside and left hand outside his opponent's arms. His most common winning technique was a straightforward yorikiri, or frontal force out. Other common techniques included the basic oshidashi (frontal push out) as well as hatakikomi (slap down).

== Career record ==
Daishōhō Kiyohiro
Year	January Hatsu basho, Tokyo	March Haru basho, Osaka	May Natsu basho, Tokyo	July Nagoya basho, Nagoya	September Aki basho, Tokyo	November Kyūshū basho, Fukuoka
2013	x	(Maezumō)	West Jonokuchi #5; 6–1	East Jonidan #26; 7–0; Champion	West Sandanme #33; 2–5	East Sandanme #58; 6–1
2014	East Sandanme #5; 5–2	West Makushita #44; 5–2	West Makushita #31; 4–3	West Makushita #24; 4–3	West Makushita #18; 3–4	West Makushita #23; 4–3
2015	East Makushita #18; 5–2	West Makushita #10; 3–4	East Makushita #18; 5–2	East Makushita #9; 5–2	West Makushita #4; 4–3	West Makushita #2; 3–4
2016	West Makushita #5; 4–3	East Makushita #3; 3–4	West Makushita #7; 4–3	East Makushita #4; 4–3	West Makushita #1; 5–2	East Jūryō #12; 5–10
2017	East Makushita #4; 3–4	West Makushita #7; 5–2	East Makushita #4; 3–4	West Makushita #7; 4–3	East Makushita #5; 5–2	East Makushita #3; 5–2
2018	West Jūryō #13; 9–6	West Jūryō #9; 9–6	West Jūryō #6; 8–7	East Jūryō #5; 8–7	East Jūryō #3; 8–7	East Jūryō #2; 8–7
2019	West Jūryō #1; 8–7	East Maegashira #16; 7–8	East Maegashira #16; 9–6	West Maegashira #9; 6–9	West Maegashira #12; 5–10	West Maegashira #15; 3–12
2020	West Jūryō #5; 9–6	West Jūryō #3; 4–11	East Jūryō #10; Tournament Cancelled; State of Emergency; 0–0–0	East Jūryō #10; 6–9	West Jūryō #12; 6–9	East Makushita #1; 3–4
2021	West Makushita #4; 4–3	West Makushita #2; 5–2	East Jūryō #13; 8–7	East Jūryō #12; 6–9	West Jūryō #14; 11–4	West Jūryō #7; 7–8
2022	West Jūryō #7; 6–9	East Jūryō #9; 10–5	West Jūryō #5; 9–6	West Jūryō #3; 4–9–2	West Jūryō #8; 7–8	West Jūryō #9; 8–7
2023	West Jūryō #6; 12–3	East Maegashira #13; 8–7	West Maegashira #11; 6–9	East Maegashira #14; 6–9	East Maegashira #17; 3–12	East Jūryō #7; 5–10
2024	West Jūryō #9; 9–6	West Jūryō #7; 10–5	West Jūryō #2; 5–10	East Jūryō #4; 5–10	East Jūryō #9; 6–9	West Jūryō #9; 4–11
2025	West Jūryō #14; 1–14	West Makushita #7; 4–3	East Makushita #6; 1–6	West Makushita #26; 1–6	East Makushita #54; 4–3	West Makushita #44; 2–5
2026	East Sandanme #5; 3–4	West Sandanme #16; Retired –	x	x	x	x
Record given as wins–losses–absences Top division champion Top division runner-up Retired Non-participation Jūryō Lower divisions Sanshō key: F=Fighting spirit; O=Outstanding performance; T=Technique Also shown: ★=Kinboshi; P=Playoff(s); Divisions: Makuuchi — Jūryō — Makushita — Sandanme — Jonidan — Jonokuchi Makuuchi ranks: Yokozuna — Ōzeki — Sekiwake — Komusubi — Maegashira

== See also ==
- Glossary of sumo terms
- List of past sumo wrestlers
- List of Mongolian sumo wrestlers
- List of non-Japanese sumo wrestlers
