= Kanazawa Gakuin University =

Higher education institution in Ishikawa Prefecture, Japan

Coordinates: 36°31′2.6″N 136°41′40.5″E

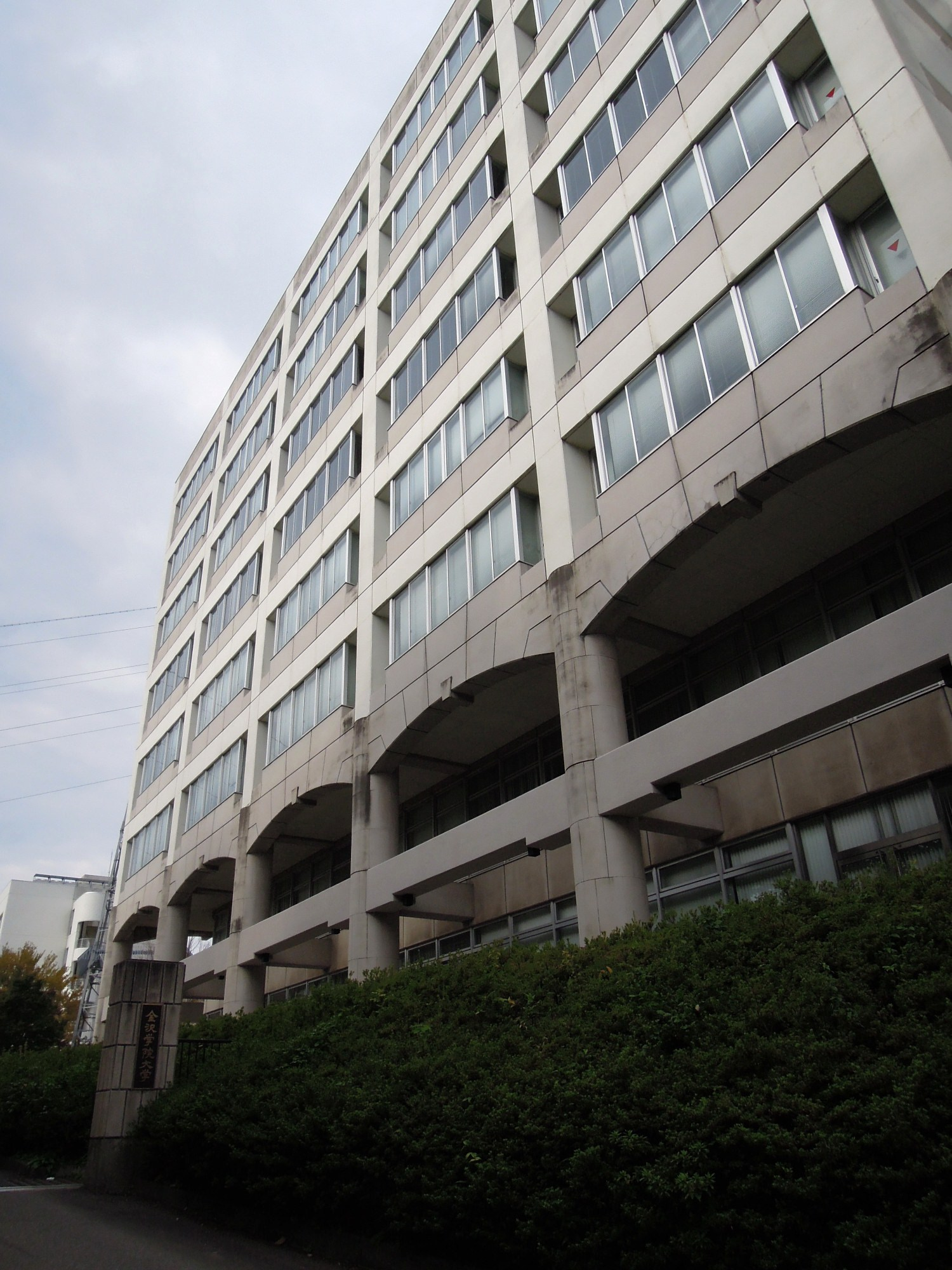
Kanazawa Gakuin University

Kanazawa Gakuin University (金沢学院大学, Kanazawa gakuin daigaku) is a private university in Kanazawa, Ishikawa, Japan. The school opened initially as Kanazawa Private Women's College in 1946, and became Kanazawa Women's University in 1987. It became coeducational and took on its current name in 2017.

== Sports ==
In recent years, Kanazawa Gakuin University has been dominant in collegiate sumo wrestling tournaments. Professional sumo wrestler Enhō is a graduate of Kanazawa Gakuin University. In December 2023, fourth-year student Ikeda Shun took first place at the All-Japan Sumo Championship for amateurs.
