= Rokurō Takayasu =

Rokurō Takayasu (高安 六郎, Takayasu Rokurō; born 1934), also called Ryūsen (竜泉), is a Japanese religious leader who is the founder of the Okinawan Ijun religion.

Takayasu was born in the Okinawan city of Naha in 1934. Since early childhood he played children's roles in the Okinawan theatre. His first spiritual experience, as related by himself, was while being evacuated to Taiwan near the end of World War II, he experienced sharp physical pain as Okinawa was bombarded by warships. After the war he started to show interest in religious activities and in 1972 created the movement known today as Ijun.

Takayasu also developed a new concept of deity and a new system of belief. In 1992 Takayasu changed his given name from Rokurō to Ryūsen.
