= Tejime =

Japanese ceremonial rhythmic hand clapping

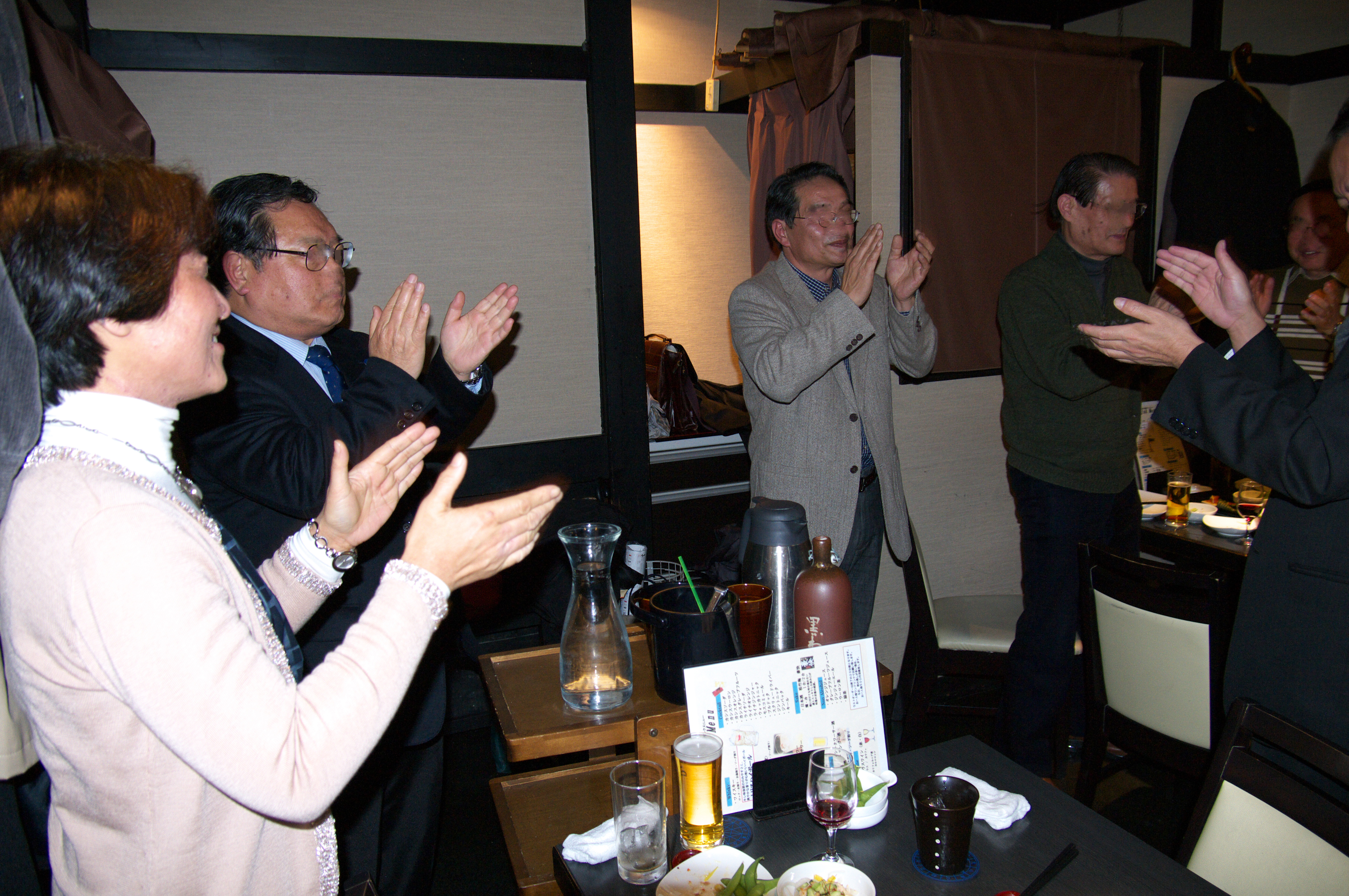
Tejime at an alumni association in Japan

Tejime (手締め), also called teuchi (手打ち), is a Japanese custom of ceremonial rhythmic hand clapping, typically accompanied by enthusiastic exclamation by the participants, performed at the end of a special event to bring the occasion to a peaceful, lively close. Tejime may be performed at the conclusion of such events as a celebration, meeting of shareholders, or the close of bargaining or other business negotiations. Tejime observes fulfillment, realization, and completion.

Tejime begins by a call from the leader, typically "ote wo haishaku" (お手を拝借), after which the participants, just before clapping their hands, usually yell "iyō'o" (イヨーオ), "yo" (ヨッ) or "mō itchō" (もう一丁) in order to synchronize timing.

== Etymology ==
Tejime is an abbreviated form of teuchi de shimeru (手打ちで締める), "teuchi" meaning "to strike a deal" or "to come to an agreement" and shimeru (締める) meaning "to tie" or "to fasten" (in this case, "to close"). Teuchi is used synonymously with tejime, with the former preferred in the Kansai Region.

== Types of tejime ==
There are various ways of clapping hands. The main types are:

- Itchō-jime (一丁締め), which consists of a single clap.
- The Edo-style tejime:

- Ippon-jime (一本締め), which consists of three sets of three claps and one final clap (3-3-3-1).

- Sanbon-jime (三本締め), which consists of three ippon-jime, i.e. three sets of three claps and one final clap (3-3-3-1 3-3-3-1 3-3-3-1).

For example, in the case of sanbon-jime, the ceremony would go like this:

- Ote wo haishaku (lit. the borrowing of [your] hands)
- Iyō'o *clap clap clap, clap clap clap, clap clap clap, clap*
- Yo *clap clap clap, clap clap clap, clap clap clap, clap*
- Yo *clap clap clap, clap clap clap, clap clap clap, clap*
- Arigatō gozaimashita (thank you)

Other types of tejime include Ōsaka-jime (大阪締め) and Hakata te ippon (博多手一本), which is performed during the Hakata-Gion Yamakasa Festival (博多祇園山笠), held in Fukuoka in July.

== See also ==
- Customs and etiquette of Japan
- Banzai
- Hakushu
