= Wakatakakage Atsushi =

Japanese sumo wrestler

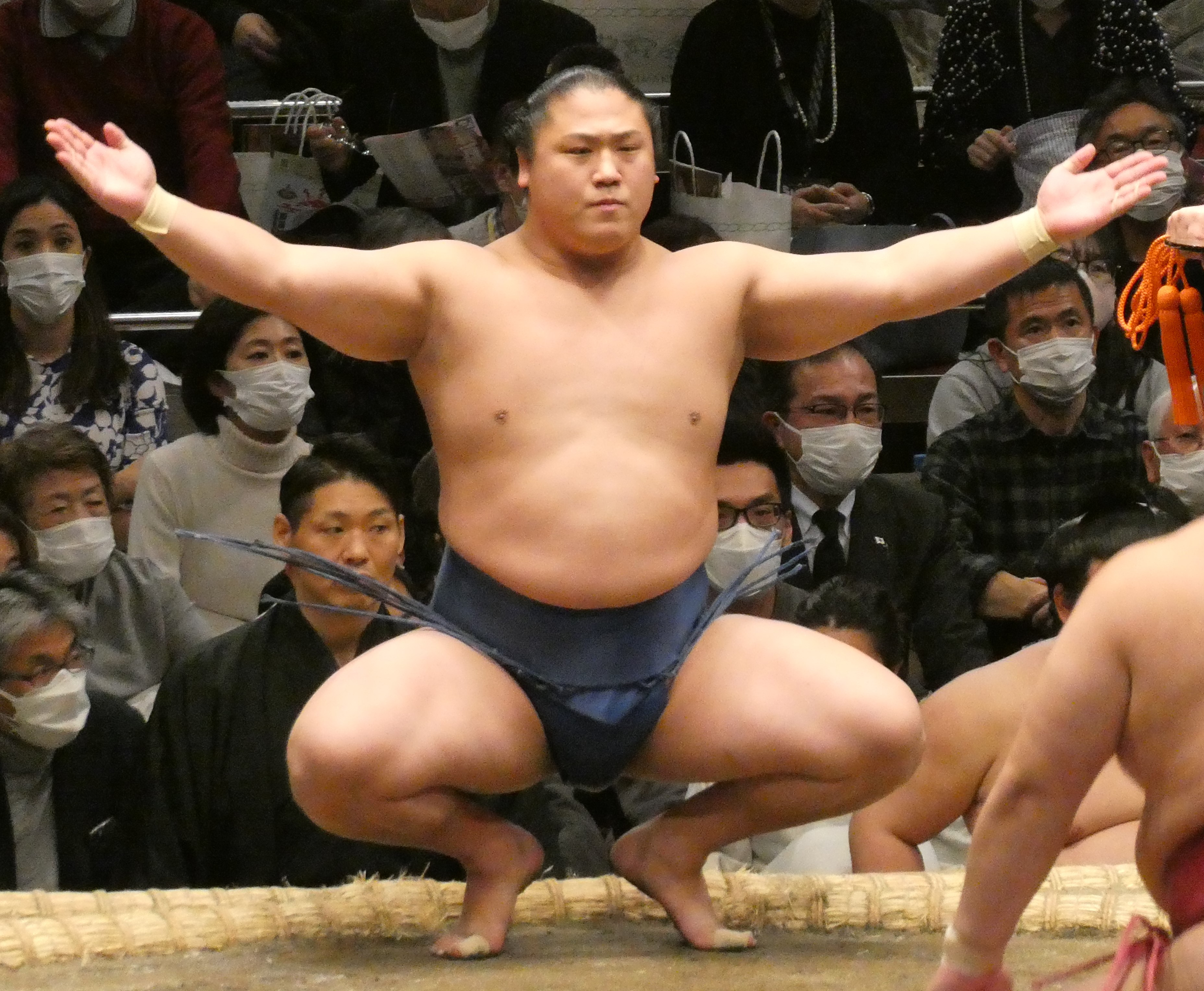
- Wakatakakage in 2022

Personal information
- Native name: 若隆景 渥
- Born: Atsushi Onami; December 6, 1994 (age 31) Fukushima, Fukushima, Japan
- Height: 1.83 m (6 ft 0 in)
- Weight: 138 kg (304 lb; 21.7 st)

Sport
- Sport: Sumo
- Rank: see below
- University team: Toyo University
- Heya: Arashio
- Debut: March 2017
- Highest rank: Sekiwake (March 2022)
- Championships: 2 (Makuuchi); 2 (Juryo); 2 (Makushita); 1 (Sandanme)
- Special Prizes: Technique (7); Outstanding Performance (1)
- Gold Stars: 1 Ōnosato
- Updated on November 22, 2026

Wakatakakage Atsushi (Japanese: 若隆景 渥; born December 6, 1994 as Atsushi Onami (大波 渥, Ōnami Atsushi)) is a Japanese professional sumo wrestler from Fukushima. He made his debut in March 2017 and reached the top makuuchi division in November 2019. He wrestles for Arashio stable, where he is a stablemate of his older brothers Wakatakamoto and Wakamotoharu. His highest rank has been sekiwake. He won his first top division championship in March 2022 and his first kinboshi in March 2026, followed by a second makuuchi championship in May 2026. For his career Wakatakakage has collected one Outstanding Performance prize and seven Technique prizes.

Wakatakakage sat out for several tournaments in 2023 while recovering from reconstructive knee surgery.

== Family background ==
The three Onami brothers are the grandsons of former komusubi Wakabayama. They were given their shikona or sumo names by Arashio stable's head coach Ōyutaka, after the three sons of Mōri Motonari in the well-known Japanese parable "Lesson of the three arrows" – Takamoto, Motoharu, and Takakage. The eldest brother, Wakatakamoto, has a highest rank of makushita 7 and has been in sumo the longest, debuting in November 2009. Wakatakakage and Wakamotoharu are the 19th pair of brothers in sumo to both reach sekitori level. Wakamotoharu is the second eldest and entered in November 2011, but did not make his jūryō debut until after Wakatakakage, in March 2019. On the January 2022 banzuke Wakamotoharu made his makuuchi division debut. Wakatakakage, the youngest brother, had by far the quickest rise up the rankings of the three.

Wakatakakage and his brother Wakamotoharu are the fourth siblings in history to reach sumo's third-highest rank of sekiwake, achieved with Wakamotoharu's promotion in May 2023. They are the first siblings to reach the rank since yokozuna brothers Takanohana and Wakanohana in the early 1990s.

== Career ==
=== Sumo debut and makuuchi promotion ===
Wakatakakage made his professional debut in March 2017, and because of his success in amateur sumo began as a sandanme tsukedashi entrant. He won the sandanme division championship in May 2017 with a perfect 7–0 record and also won the makushita division championship in January 2018 by the same score. He made his jūryō debut in May 2018, the second to do from Arashio stable after Sokokurai in 2010 and the first from Fukushima Prefecture since Sōtairyū in 2009. He rose slowly up the jūryō division, winning promotion to the top makuuchi division after a 9–6 record at jūryō 3 in September 2019. Despite a poor 2–6 start to that tournament he won his final seven matches (including wins over top division veterans such as Toyonoshima and Kaisei) to secure his promotion. He was the third sandanme tsukedashi entrant to reach the top division after Yutakayama and Asanoyama.

Wakatakakage won his first four bouts in his top division debut in November 2019, but dislocated a joint in his right foot after landing awkwardly during his fourth day win over Terutsuyoshi and had to withdraw from the rest of the tournament. Back in jūryō he put together two consecutive winning records of 9–6 and 10–5 upon his return from injury to earn promotion back the top division for the (subsequently cancelled) May 2020 tournament at his highest rank to date of maegashira 14. In July 2020 he completed his first full tournament in makuuchi, posting a respectable 10 wins. In September he was on the leaderboard for much of the tournament, although he picked up his fourth loss to Mitakeumi on Day 14 and finished in a share of third place on 11–4.

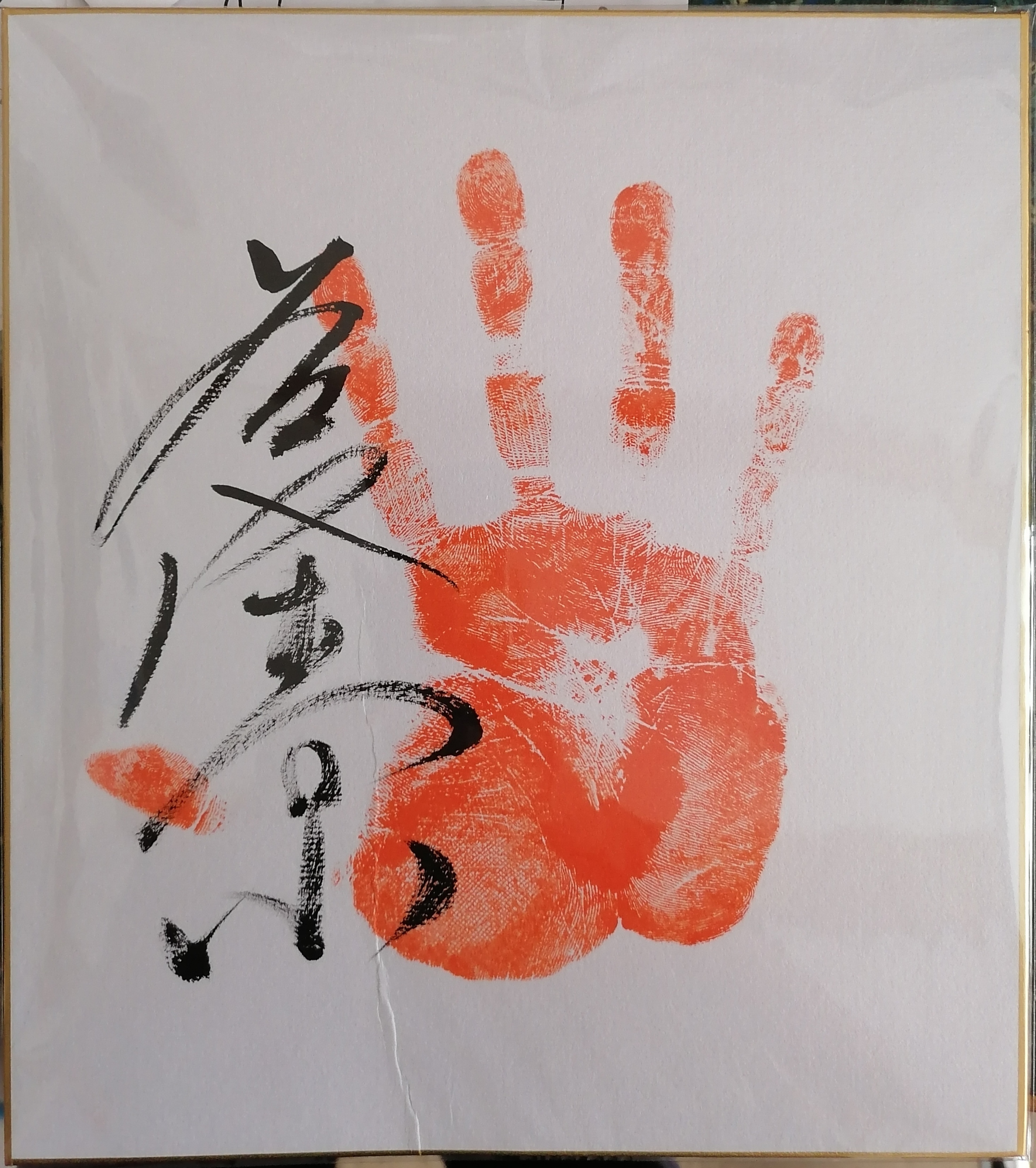
Original tegata (handprint and signature ) of sumo wrestler Wakatakakage

On 31 December 2020 – 10 days before the start of the January 2021 basho - it was announced by the Sumo Association that Wakatakakage tested positive for COVID-19. The entire Arashio stable – along with the Miyagino, Tomozuna and Kokonoe stables – sat out the tournament. He returned in March and produced a 10–5 record, defeating two ōzeki and receiving the Technique Prize. He earned his second Technique Prize in May 2021 with a 9–6 record and was promoted to the san'yaku ranks for the first time as komusubi. He was the first from Arashio stable to reach the komusubi rank since its founding in 2002.

=== san'yaku ===
After consecutive winning records at the top maegashira rank in November 2021 and January 2022, Wakatakakage was promoted to a career-best rank of sekiwake for the March 2022 tournament. He followed up this sekiwake debut by winning his first makuuchi tournament after producing a 12-3 record and defeating co-leader Takayasu in a playoff, along with receiving his third Technique prize. This marked the first time in 86 years that a newly promoted sekiwake won the championship (after Futabayama in 1936), as well as the first time in 50 years that a wrestler from Fukushima Prefecture won the championship (after Tochiazuma in January 1972). Wakatakakage failed to defeat ōzeki Shōdai in the final regulation match (thus missing out on the Outstanding Performance Prize that he would have received with a 13–2 record), but was guaranteed at least a playoff as Takayasu had lost his own match to Abi earlier in the day.

Wakatakakage followed up his tournament win with a 9–6 record in the May 2022 tournament. Maintaining his sekiwake rank in July, Wakatakakage recovered from losing his first three matches in September to produce an 11–4 record. He received his fourth Technique Prize on the final day. He achieved an 8–7 record in the November tournament to close out the year.

=== Injury and relegation ===
In the January 2023 tournament Wakatakakage earned a 9–6 record. He withdrew towards the end of the March 2023 basho after injuring his right ACL and meniscus in his win over Kotonowaka on Day 13. The following month stablemaster Arashio (former maegashira Sōkokurai) announced that Wakatakakage would be sidelined for up to one year after undergoing reconstructive knee surgery. After his operation, Wakatakage resumed training at the end of August 2023, notably facing sandanme stablemates. When withdrawing from the September tournament, his medical certificate with the Sumo Association indicated he would need "approximately one month of treatment and outpatient rehabilitation."

In preparation for the November 2023 tournament, Wakatakakage was demoted to the makushita division, where he was ranked sixth. No longer a sekitori, observers noted that he now wore the black mawashi of the lower-ranked wrestlers during his trainings. Noting his training sessions without knee braces, Sports Hochi speculated about a possible return to competition for the Kyushu tournament that same month, something that Wakatakakage's master, Arashio, had already hinted at at the beginning of October. Wakatakakage's return at the November tournament was confirmed when his name was listed among the makushita matches for the first day. He began his comeback with a defeat but bounced back to finish the tournament with a score of 5–2. During the first tournament of 2024, Wakatakakage won all his matches, winning his second makushita championship, the first in six years. This victory marks the second time a former makuuchi championship winner has won a makushita championship after a period of demotion, the first being yokozuna Terunofuji in 2019. After his championship victory, it was announced that Wakatakakage would be repromoted to the jūryō division for the March tournament. He won the May 2024 jūryō championship with 14 wins, resulting in his return to the top division in July.

=== Return to san'yaku ===
When the banzuke for the January 2025 tournament was published, it was confirmed that Wakatakakage was returning to the san'yaku ranks, where his brother Wakamotoharu also competed. Wakamotoharu, having completed on two successful tournaments in September and November 2024, could, according to the press, count on his brother's promotion in order to aim for the rank of ōzeki. Wakatakakage quickly dispatched Terunofuji on the opening day of the January tournament to mark his first career victory against a yokozuna.

During the 2025 May tournament, Wakatakakage stood out as one of the leaders of the competition, recording seven victories and one defeat during the first half of the tournament, sharing the lead group after undefeated ōzeki Ōnosato with Aonishiki and Hakuōhō. Although he fell behind in the race for the title, Wakatakakage matched his personal best with a total of twelve victories, renewing hopes of promotion to ōzeki. For his performance, he also won his sixth Technique prize. At the July 2025 tournament Wakatakakage won ten times, putting him in a position for potential promotion to sumo's second-highest rank of ōzeki if he can win 11 or more matches in September. Before the tournament, his chances of promotion were commented on by Takadagawa (former sekiwake Akinoshima), head of the Judging Department, who announced that his sumo level should be sufficient for promotion to the rank of ōzeki if he managed to achieve a simple double-digit score (ten wins), rather than clinging to the criterion of 33 wins in the last three tournaments.

The run for the ōzeki title was considered compromised when Wakatakakage suffered a fourth defeat against Kirishima on Day 9. Although benefiting from the presence of Kotozakura alone in the ōzeki rank, which would allow him to be promoted with only ten wins, it was noted that his chances had become slim as he had yet to face either of the two yokozuna. After suffering a sixth defeat to Kotoshōhō on Day 11, his promotion chances were ended. On Day 14, he suffered his eighth defeat, ensuring his demotion from san'yaku for the November tournament. On the opening day of the March 2026 tournament, Wakatakakage, then ranked at Maegashira 1, defeated Yokozuna Ōnosato by oshidashi for his first career kinboshi. In his Day 13 match against Abi, Wakatakakage appeared to aggravate the right-elbow injury that he suffered prior to the tournament. Despite this, Wakatakakage won the match to secure his kachi-koshi and return to the san'yaku ranks in the next tournament. He withdrew on Day 14, giving Daieishō a default victory.

=== Second yūshō and injury ===
Wakatakakage entered the May 2026 Tournament as a komusubi. During the first half of the tournament, aided by notable absences, including both yokozuna, he opened up a strong 7–1 record, looking dominant against several highly-ranked opponents. This included a victory over ōzeki Kotozakura on Day 2. After a loss on Day 9 to sekiwake Kotoshōhō, he returned to winning ways on Day 10, defeating sekiwake Atamifuji by yorikiri. However, on day 11 he would lose to tournament leader and defending champion Kirishima by yorikiri. Despite this setback, he recorded four straight victories over the final four days of the tournament, beating surprise yūshō contender Fujiryōga on Day 15 to finish with a 12–3 record, equalling the record of fellow yūshō contender, Kirishima. Kirishima had been the outright leader for much of the tournament, however he suffered a surprise loss on Day 14 against maegashira Hakunofuji, opening up the race for the title. The victory of Kirishima against Ura on Day 15 ensured a play-off final would be necessary between the two tournament leaders, while eliminating several other rikishi from the title race. In stark contrast to their bout on Day 11, Wakatakakage beat his opponent via oshidashi to claim his second makuuchi tournament victory, in addition to his seventh career Technique Prize.

After winning the title, hopes that Wakatakakage would solidify his path toward promotion to the rank of ōzeki were dashed when he announced in early July that he would not be competing for the entire duration of the Nagoya tournament. His absence was due to an injury sustained during practice on 1 July. The injury subsequently worsened to the point that he had to be taken to the emergency room, where he was diagnosed with femoral compartment syndrome, requiring emergency surgery lasting several hours. Wakatakakage was discharged from the hospital on July 24. According to his coach, his professional career was not in jeopardy, and the date of his return has not yet been set. However, Wakatakakage is expected to miss the September tournament, making his relegation to the jūryō division highly likely. During a press conference at the Sumo Museum during the September tournament, his stablemaster Arashio (the former Sōkokurai) stated that Wakatakakage had resumed light training and was required to go to the hospital three to four times a week for rehabilitation. In this regard, Arashio also mentioned that Wakatakakage’s participation in the final tournament of 2026 had not yet been decided. On November 4, however, it was announced that Wakatakakage would participate in the November tournament.

After being relegated to the jūryō division, Wakatakakage emerged as one of the top contenders in that division, racking up nine consecutive wins starting on the first day. Despite a loss, he continued to dominate and eliminated his closest rival in the competition, Asahifuji, on the twelfth day, taking sole possession of first place in the competition. Wakatakakage continued to maintain his lead and won the championship with a record of 14–1. At the same time, his older brother, Wakamotoharu, was also in contention for the makuuchi championship, raising hopes that the two brothers would become the first brothers in the history of the sport to win both championships at the same time. However, Ōnosato, defeated Wakamotoharu by watashikomi and won the championship.

== Fighting style ==
According to his Japan Sumo Association profile Wakatakakage prefers a migi-yotsu (right hand inside, left hand outside) grip on his opponent's mawashi. His most common winning kimarite are oshidashi (push out), yorikiri (force out) and okuridashi (push out from behind). He is below the average weight for a sekitori at 124 kilograms (273 lb) and makes use of his speed and agility. Wakatakakage is also known for his effective use of the ottsuke arm-blocking technique with his right arm, being able to employ it both as a defensive and offensive move.

== Personal life ==
Wakatakakage and his wife Sana are parents to three daughters and a son. He credits his family's support with enabling his comeback from injury culminating in a second makuuchi championship victory.

== Career record ==
Wakatakakage Atsushi
| Year | January Hatsu basho, Tokyo | March Haru basho, Osaka | May Natsu basho, Tokyo | July Nagoya basho, Nagoya | September Aki basho, Tokyo | November Kyūshū basho, Fukuoka |
|---|---|---|---|---|---|---|
| 2017 | x | Sandanme tsukedashi #100; 5–2 | West Sandanme #63; 7–0; Champion | West Makushita #38; 6–1 | East Makushita #16; 4–3 | East Makushita #12; 3–4 |
| 2018 | East Makushita #17; 7–0; Champion | East Makushita #1; 4–3 | West Jūryō #14; 8–7 | East Jūryō #12; 9–6 | West Jūryō #7; 8–7 | West Jūryō #6; 8–7 |
| 2019 | East Jūryō #5; 7–8 | East Jūryō #5; 8–7 | West Jūryō #2; 6–9 | East Jūryō #4; 8–7 | West Jūryō #3; 9–6 | East Maegashira #16; 4–1–10 |
| 2020 | East Jūryō #5; 9–6 | West Jūryō #2; 10–5 | West Maegashira #14; Tournament Cancelled; State of Emergency; 0–0–0 | West Maegashira #14; 10–5 | West Maegashira #8; 11–4 | West Maegashira #1; 7–8 |
| 2021 | West Maegashira #2; Sat out due to COVID rules 0–0–15 | West Maegashira #2; 10–5; T | East Maegashira #1; 9–6; T | East Komusubi #1; 5–10 | East Maegashira #3; 9–6 | West Maegashira #1; 8–7 |
| 2022 | East Maegashira #1; 9–6 | East Sekiwake #1; 12–3–P; T | East Sekiwake #1; 9–6 | East Sekiwake #1; 8–7 | East Sekiwake #1; 11–4; T | East Sekiwake #1; 8–7 |
| 2023 | East Sekiwake #1; 9–6 | East Sekiwake #1; 7–7–1 | West Komusubi #1; Sat out due to injury 0–0–15 | West Maegashira #12; Sat out due to injury 0–0–15 | West Jūryō #7; Sat out due to injury 0–0–15 | West Makushita #6; 5–2 |
| 2024 | West Makushita #1; 7–0; Champion | West Jūryō #10; 9–6 | West Jūryō #6; 14–1; Champion | East Maegashira #14; 11–4 | East Maegashira #7; 12–3; O | East Maegashira #2; 10–5; T |
| 2025 | West Komusubi #1; 7–8 | East Maegashira #1; 9–6 | West Komusubi #1; 12–3; T | West Sekiwake #2; 10–5 | East Sekiwake #1; 6–9 | West Maegashira #1; 7–8 |
| 2026 | West Maegashira #2; 9–6 | East Maegashira #1; 8–6–1 ★ | East Komusubi #1; 12–3–P; T | East Sekiwake #2; Sat out due to injury 0–0–15 | East Maegashira #12; Sat out due to injury 0–0–15 | West Jūryō #5; 14–1; Champion |
Record given as wins–losses–absences Top division champion Top division runner-up Retired Non-participation Jūryō Lower divisions Sanshō key: F=Fighting spirit; O=Outstanding performance; T=Technique Also shown: ★=Kinboshi; P=Playoff(s); Divisions: Makuuchi — Jūryō — Makushita — Sandanme — Jonidan — Jonokuchi Makuuchi ranks: Yokozuna — Ōzeki — Sekiwake — Komusubi — Maegashira

== See also ==
- Glossary of sumo terms
- List of active sumo wrestlers
- List of active gold star earners
- List of active special prize winners
- List of sumo top division champions
- List of sumo top division runners-up
- List of sumo second division champions
- List of sekiwake
