= Kōtokuzan Tarō =

Japanese sumo wrestler

Kotōkuzan Tarō
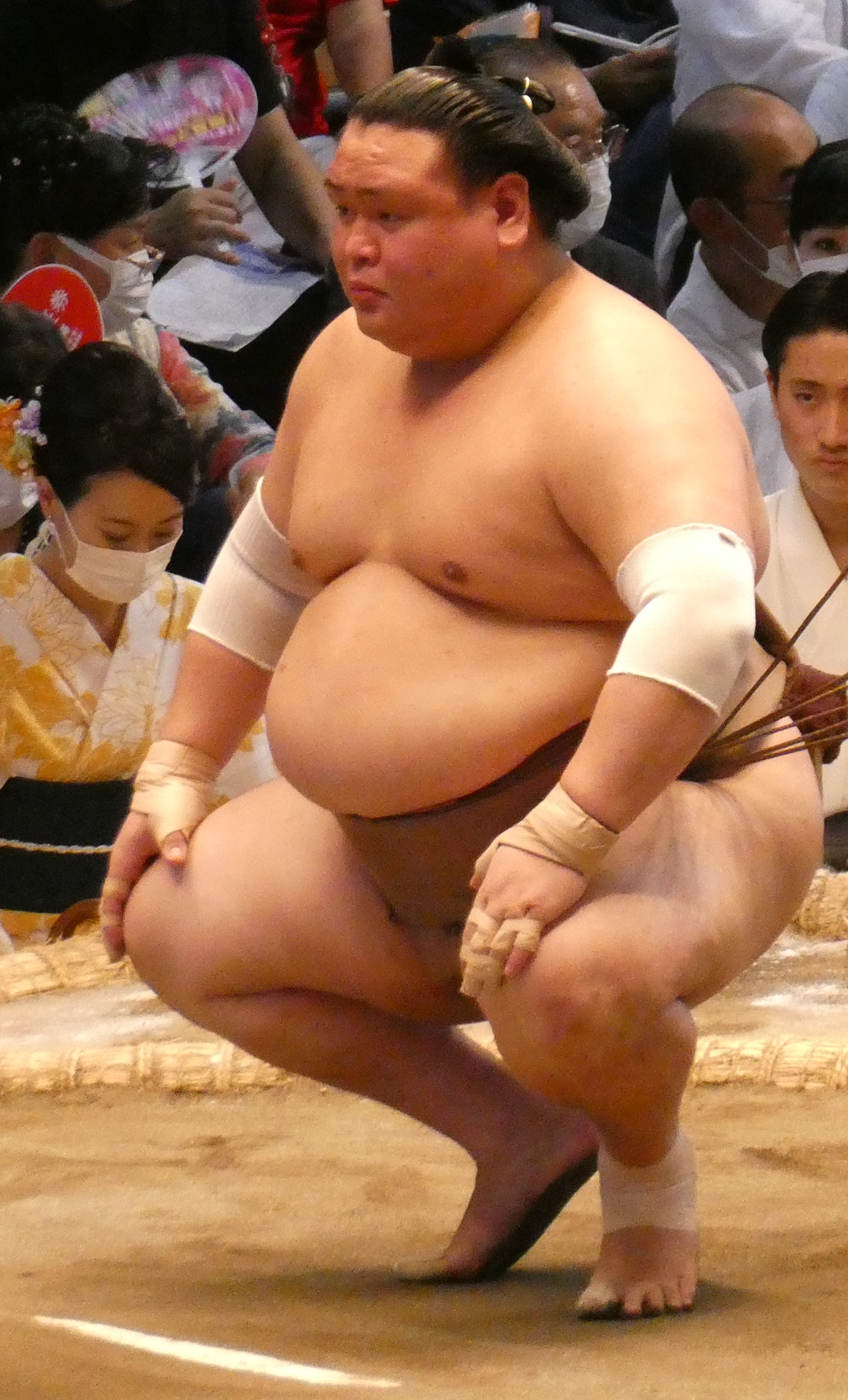

Personal information
- Native name: 荒篤山 太郎
- Born: Jasper Kenneth Arboladura Terai; 11 March 1994 (age 32) Makati, Philippines
- Height: 1.81 m (5 ft 11 1/2 in)
- Weight: 157 kg (346 lb)

Sport
- Sport: Sumo
- Rank: see below
- Heya: Arashio
- Debut: September, 2009
- Highest rank: Maegashira 16 (March 2022)
- Updated on 26 March 2023

Kōtokuzan Tarō (荒篤山 太郎; born 11 March 1994 as Jasper Kenneth Arboladura Terai) is a Filipino-Japanese professional sumo wrestler from Makati, Philippines. Making his professional debut in September 2009, he reached the top makuuchi division for the first time in March 2022. He had a highest rank of maegashira 16. He wrestles for Arashio stable.

== Career ==
Terai was born in Makati but grew up in Santa Rosa. He has two younger sisters. While his Filipino mother worked in Japan he was raised by his grandmother. He was first introduced to sumo by seeing it on TV in the Philippines. At the age of 11, he moved to Japan, joining his mother and his stepfather (he never knew his biological father). He had never learnt the Japanese language before entering school and struggled with reading kanji. Fearing he would not make a good high school student, he took the advice of his stepfather and visited Arashio stable for two days to explore sumo as a possible alternative career path. He was accepted by the stable after graduating from junior high school.

Beginning his career at just 15, Terai was considerably younger than most of his training partners at his stable. He weighed just 103 kg and was 177 cm tall when he made his professional debut in September 2009. After his first tournament he was given the shikona of Kōtokuzan ("Kō" being a different reading of the "Ara" or 荒 kanji used at his stable). He won no championships moving up through the professional sumo divisions and moved between the fourth-tier sandanme and third makushita divisions a number of times before finally establishing himself in makushita in 2017. By this time his weight had increased to 156 kg. He was forced to sit out the January 2021 tournament due to a COVID-19 outbreak at his stable, but in the following tournament a 4–3 record moved him up to Makushita 1. In May 2021 he earned promotion to the sekitori ranks with a 5–2 record. Although his jūryō division debut in July was unsuccessful—a 4—11 score dropping him back to makushita—he returned to jūryō in November. Two consecutive winning records in double figures saw him promoted to the top makuuchi division for the March 2022 tournament. He followed his stablemate Wakamotoharu, who had made his top division debut in the previous tournament. Kōtokuzan represents Kanagawa Prefecture, and he is the tenth wrestler from that prefecture to reach makuuchi.

Kōtokuzan was unable to secure more wins than losses at his top division debut, eventually dropping out of makuuchi in two tournaments. He was demoted out of sekitori status the following year. Two years after that, following the May 2025 tournament, it was announced that Kōtokuzan would return to jūryō after posting five wins at the rank of makushita 4.

== Fighting style ==
Kōtokuzan is an oshi-sumo specialist, who prefers pushing and thrusting at his opponents rather than fighting on the mawashi or belt. His most common winning kimarite are hataki komi (slap down) tsuki otoshi (thrust down) and oshi dashi (push out).

== Career record ==
Kōtokuzan Tarō
Year	January Hatsu basho, Tokyo	March Haru basho, Osaka	May Natsu basho, Tokyo	July Nagoya basho, Nagoya	September Aki basho, Tokyo	November Kyūshū basho, Fukuoka
2009	x	x	x	x	(Maezumō)	West Jonokuchi #28; 4–3
2010	East Jonidan #104; 3–4	East Jonidan #109; 4–3	West Jonidan #74; 2–5	West Jonidan #100; 5–2	West Jonidan #52; 2–5	West Jonidan #84; 6–1
2011	East Jonidan #10; 1–6	West Jonidan #56; Tournament Cancelled; Match fixing investigation 0–0–0	West Jonidan #56; 5–2	West Jonidan #7; 4–3	West Sandanme #85; 4–3	East Sandanme #67; 4–3
2012	West Sandanme #53; 2–5	West Sandanme #84; 4–3	West Sandanme #68; 2–5	West Sandanme #92; 5–2	West Sandanme #62; 5–2	West Sandanme #35; 4–3
2013	West Sandanme #20; 4–3	East Sandanme #6; 3–4	West Sandanme #20; 4–3	West Sandanme #9; 2–5	West Sandanme #34; 3–4	West Sandanme #48; 5–2
2014	East Sandanme #24; 2–5	East Sandanme #48; 4–3	East Sandanme #35; 4–3	West Sandanme #22; 4–3	West Sandanme #11; 5–2	East Makushita #51; 3–4
2015	West Sandanme #1; 3–4	East Sandanme #14; 5–2	East Makushita #52; 3–4	West Sandanme #1; 3–4	East Sandanme #16; 5–2	East Makushita #52; 4–3
2016	West Makushita #43; 3–4	East Makushita #53; 0–2–5	West Sandanme #31; 4–3	West Sandanme #19; 4–3	East Sandanme #9; 6–1	West Makushita #34; 4–3
2017	West Makushita #28; 2–5	East Makushita #50; 5–2	West Makushita #37; 2–5	East Makushita #59; 6–1	East Makushita #28; 3–4	East Makushita #34; 6–1
2018	East Makushita #13; 2–5	East Makushita #28; 2–5	East Makushita #45; 6–1	West Makushita #19; 4–3	East Makushita #16; 4–3	East Makushita #11; 4–3
2019	West Makushita #8; 5–2	West Makushita #2; 1–6	East Makushita #18; 3–4	East Makushita #24; 4–3	West Makushita #20; 4–3	East Makushita #14; 4–3
2020	East Makushita #8; 1–6	West Makushita #32; 5–2	East Makushita #18; Tournament Cancelled; State of Emergency; 0–0–0	East Makushita #18; 4–3	West Makushita #11; 5–2	West Makushita #5; 4–3
2021	East Makushita #3; Sat out due to COVID rules 0–0–7	East Makushita #3; 4–3	East Makushita #1; 5–2	West Jūryō #13; 4–11	West Makushita #2; 4–3	West Jūryō #14; 11–4
2022	West Jūryō #4; 10–5	West Maegashira #16; 7–8	East Maegashira #17; 2–13	West Jūryō #7; 8–7	East Jūryō #7; 7–8	West Jūryō #8; 8–7
2023	West Jūryō #5; 4–11	East Jūryō #10; 4–11	East Makushita #2; 3–4	East Makushita #4; 2–5	East Makushita #10; 3–4	East Makushita #14; 4–3
2024	East Makushita #10; 4–3	West Makushita #7; 4–3	West Makushita #4; 4–3	East Makushita #3; 3–4	East Makushita #7; 4–3	East Makushita #4; 4–3
2025	East Makushita #2; 3–4	East Makushita #6; 4–3	West Makushita #4; 5–2	East Jūryō #14; 10–5	West Jūryō #8; 8–7	East Jūryō #6; 7–8
2026	East Jūryō #6; 3–12	West Jūryō #14; 4–11	West Makushita #3; 3–4	West Makushita #5; 3–4	East Makushita #7; 2–5	East Makushita #16; 4–3
Record given as wins–losses–absences Top division champion Top division runner-up Retired Non-participation Jūryō Lower divisions Sanshō key: F=Fighting spirit; O=Outstanding performance; T=Technique Also shown: ★=Kinboshi; P=Playoff(s); Divisions: Makuuchi — Jūryō — Makushita — Sandanme — Jonidan — Jonokuchi Makuuchi ranks: Yokozuna — Ōzeki — Sekiwake — Komusubi — Maegashira

== See also ==
- Glossary of sumo terms
- List of active sumo wrestlers
