= Wakamotoharu Minato =

Japanese professional sumo wrestler

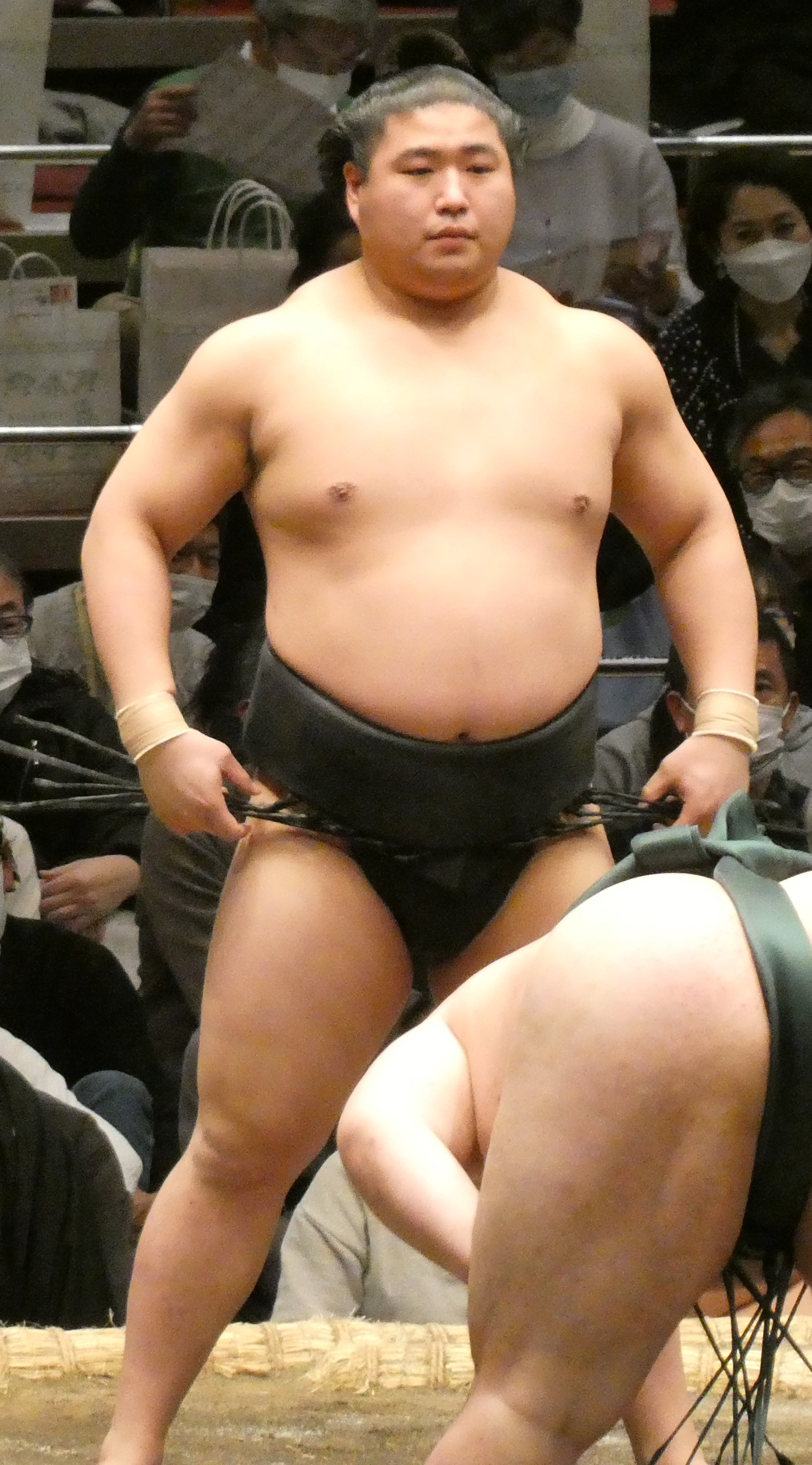
- Wakamotoharu in January 2022

Personal information
- Native name: 若元春 港
- Born: Minato Onami; October 5, 1993 (age 33) Fukushima, Fukushima, Japan
- Height: 1.86 m (6 ft 1 in)
- Weight: 149 kg (328 lb; 23.5 st)

Sport
- Sport: Sumo
- Rank: See below
- Heya: Arashio
- Debut: November 2011
- Highest rank: Sekiwake (May 2023)
- Championships: 2 (Makushita); 1 (Jonokuchi)
- Special Prizes: Technique (2); Outstanding Performance (1)
- Gold Stars: 3 Terunofuji; Hōshōryū (2)
- Updated on November 22, 2026

Wakamotoharu Minato (若元春 港) (born October 5, 1993 as Minato Onami (大波 港, Ōnami Minato)) is a Japanese professional sumo wrestler from Fukushima. He wrestles for the Arashio stable, where he is a stable mate of his brothers Wakatakakage and Wakatakamoto. His highest rank to date has been sekiwake.

== Early life and family background ==
Wakamotoharu comes from a sumo family. His grandfather Wakabayama reached the rank of komusubi and his father, who was a makushita division wrestler, now owns a chankonabe restaurant in Fukushima. Wakamotoharu has an elder brother, Wakatakamoto, and a younger brother, Wakatakakage. All brothers became professional wrestlers between 2009 and 2017 and are currently wrestling for Arashio stable. Although Wakatakamoto has yet to progress beyond the makushita division, Wakatakakage was the first to surpass their grandfather's achievements when he reached the rank of sekiwake in 2022. When the three brothers first entered professional sumo, they were given shikona, or ring names, inspired by the parable of the three arrows of 16th-century warlord Mōri Motonari. Wakamotoharu's ring name is derived from the first kanji of his grandfather's shikona and the name of the second son in the parable, Kikkawa Motoharu.

As a child, Wakamotoharu was particularly admiring of Sōtairyū, at the time the only sekitori ranked wrestler from his home prefecture of Fukushima. He was part of Gakuhō Fukushima High School's sumo club, in the city of Fukushima. As a high school student, he was one of the victims of the 2011 earthquake. During the initial reconstruction period, he moved to the Arashio stable in Tokyo with his younger brother Wakatakakage to live and train there for a month, thanks to the help of his older brother Wakatakamoto, who was already wrestling in the stable. That same year, he decided to become a professional sumo wrestler in the same stable as a sign of gratitude after they had welcomed him and his brother.

== Career ==
=== Early career ===
Wakamotoharu made his professional debut in November 2011 under the shikona, or ring name, Araonami (荒大波). In his first official tournament (honbasho) in January 2012, under the new shikona Goshi (剛士), he won the jonokuchi championship, or yūshō, with a perfect 7–0 record. In May 2017 he adopted the shikona of Wakamotoharu. In January 2019 he won the makushita division championship with an undefeated 7–0 score and was promoted to the jūryō division along Kiribayama. At the time of his first promotion to the jūryō division, he and Wakatakakage became the twentieth pair of brothers to achieve the status of sekitori in sumo history. Commenting on his promotion his master Arashio (former komusubi Ōyutaka) and his senior Sōkokurai expressed their reservations, with his master commenting that he had been expecting a promotion for three years and criticising Wakamotoharu's lack of effort in training. Sōkokurai, for his part, commented that he had had to encourage him since the end of 2018 in order for him to give himself the means for promotion. During his first jūryō tournament, Wakamotoharu scored only five wins and was demoted back to makushita. He however returned to jūryō after a 6–1 record at makushita 1 in September 2019.

Since his master (former Ōyutaka) was from Niigata Prefecture, Wakamotoharu regularly attended training camps organized by his stable to scout promising young talent, training notably with future Ōnosato.

In November 2019 he had to apologize after a picture of him bound to a chair and gagged with tape was posted on social media by fellow wrestler Abi. The prank was criticized for seeming to make light of past incidents of violence within sumo stables, and the Japan Sumo Association responded by banning sumo wrestlers from having individual social media accounts.

=== Makuuchi career ===
In December 2021 the Japan Sumo Association released the rankings for the January 2022 tournament, and he was promoted to the top makuuchi division, joining his younger brother Wakatakakage. Wakamotoharu and Wakatakakage are the 12th pair of brothers to both be ranked in the top division at the same time. He is the second member of Arashio stable to make the top division following Wakatakakage in November 2019, and the first since the current stablemaster, former maegashira Sōkokurai, took over. Speaking to reporters Wakamotoharu recalled the difficulty of beginning 2021 by having to sit out the January tournament because of a COVID-19 infection but ending it with his best result as a sekitori, an 11-4 record in November, which saw him win promotion. He said that he hoped he would be able to outdo his younger brother. At the time of his promotion, the supporters' association in his hometown of Fukushima gave him a replica of the keshō-mawashi worn by his grandfather Wakabayama. On display in his parents' chanko restaurant, the original keshō-mawashi depicts a lion dance scene.

In the January 2022 tournament Wakamotoharu secured a winning record in his makuuchi debut on Day 14 when he defeated Tobizaru. His second straight winning record came on Day 12 of the March 2022 tournament, when he defeated Endō to move to 8–4. He finished the tournament with another 9–6 record.

Wakamotoharu's bout against Terunofuji in the July 2022 tournament was stopped after two minutes by gyōji Shikimori Inosuke after Wakamotoharu's mawashi became undone. After a pause of about ten minutes for a mono-ii and to reset the positions of the wrestlers, Wakamotoharu was defeated when Terunofuji quickly swung him out of the ring with an underarm throw.

After two consecutive 10-5 winning records in the top maegashira ranks, Wakamotoharu was promoted to komusubi for the January 2023 tournament. He secured a winning record in his san'yaku debut on the 14th day. He retained his komusubi ranking in the March banzuke. In May 2023 he was promoted to sekiwake, making him and his brother Wakatakakage the fourth siblings in history to reach sumo's third-highest rank, and the first since yokozuna brothers Takanohana and Wakanohana in the early 1990s. During the May tournament, he notably defeated Ōzeki Takakeishō on Day 14. He finished the tournament with a 10-5 record and was awarded the Technique prize.

After the tournament, the hypothesis of Wakamotoharu's promotion to ōzeki received a response from the chairman of the judging committee, Sadogatake, who commented that the July tournament would be one where promotion to ōzeki would be considered if his results were good enough. Wakamotoharu would need 12 wins at the July basho to reach the normal ōzeki promotion requirement of 33 wins at san'yaku in three tournaments. Commenting on his potential promotion, Wakamotoharu expressed his relief at seeing his career finally stabilize in the sport's top division. Similarly, he confided that his position as ōzeki-tori (candidate for the rank of ōzeki) came as a surprise to him, as he has spent the majority of his career trying to catch up with his brother Wakatakakage in the rankings, his younger brother also having been in his potential promotion situation before him. Aware of his situation he also expressed his wish to become the equal of former ōzeki Kaiō and Chiyotaikai.

Prior to the July tournament, Wakamotoharu received a keshō-mawashi from his Fukushima patronage association. Designed by his mother, who used to work in the design industry after graduating from an art school, the design features flowers and fruit from the prefecture to evoke the Hanamiyama Park. During the tournament, however, Wakamotoharu lost his chance of the ōzeki title when he suffered his fourth defeat on Day 12 to returning ōzeki Kirishima.

Wakamotoharu lost his san'yaku status for the first tournament of 2024, having been demoted to the rank of maegashira 1. On Day 2 of the tournament, he claimed his very first kinboshi (gold star) with an upset victory over Yokozuna Terunofuji in a match lasting 1 minute and 42 seconds. This was followed up the next day with a victory over one of the ōzeki competitors, Takakeishō. Wakamotoharu finished the tournament with 10 wins, with reports suggesting his record to be enough to earn promotion back to the san'yaku ranks. For his feat in beating the yokozuna and several other san'yaku-ranked opponents, he received the Outstanding Performance Prize.

At the May 2024 tournament, Wakamotoharu withdrew from the competition on the seventh day, citing an injury to his left toe sustained during training. However, he did not rule out the possibility of returning to the tournament. He returned on Day 11 but was defeated by Hiradoumi, resulting in a losing record. After two good tournaments in September and November, the press echoed Wakamotoharu's chances of being promoted to ōzeki if he could have a good tournament in January 2025, encouraged by his brother Wakatakakage's promotion to san'yaku. However, Wakamotoharu's 6-win performance in January would see him demoted to the uppermost maegashira rank, where he would remain for the next several tournaments.

At the July 2025 tournament in Nagoya, Wakamotoharu picked up his second career gold star on the second day by defeating yokozuna Hōshōryū. In November, he repeated the feat, earning his third gold star.

In October 2026, Wakamotoharu won the All Japan Rikishi Championship, a Meiji Shrine sponsored charity tournament, after defeating Ura in the finals.

During the November 2026 tournament, Wakamotoharu emerged as one of the tournament's top wreslters, racking up seven consecutive wins by the midway point, starting on the third day. On the eleventh day, he took sole possession of first place in the tournament with his tenth victory. On the thirteenth day, however, he was defeated by his closest rival, yokozuna Ōnosato, putting him back in a tie. For his performance throughout the tournament, Wakamotoharu received an unconditional special prize for Technique. On the final day of the tournament, Wakamotoharu and Ōnosato maintained their respective records, leading to a playoff to determine the champion. Since Wakatakakage, Wakamotoharu's younger brother, had won the jūryō championship, the two brothers had a chance to become the first pair of brothers in the history of the sport to win both championships at the same time. Ōnosato, however, defeated Wakamotoharu by watashikomi and won the championship.

== Fighting style ==
Wakamotoharu prefers to grab his opponent's mawashi rather than push or thrust, and his favourite grip is hidari-yotsu, with his right hand outside and left hand inside his opponent's arms. His most common winning kimarite or technique is a straightforward yori-kiri, or force out.

== Personal life ==
Wakamotoharu announced after his makuuchi promotion that he had got married in November 2021, after a three-year relationship. Following the reception of his wedding in February 2025, he also revealed that he was the father of a daughter, born in 2020.

He is a fan of singers Ed Sheeran and Aiko, professional wrestling, the comedy duo Chocolate Planet, and the Kinnikuman series.

== Career record ==
Wakamotoharu Minato
Year	January Hatsu basho, Tokyo	March Haru basho, Osaka	May Natsu basho, Tokyo	July Nagoya basho, Nagoya	September Aki basho, Tokyo	November Kyūshū basho, Fukuoka
2011	x	x	x	x	x	(Maezumō)
2012	East Jonokuchi #15; 7–0; Champion	West Jonidan #10; 5–2	West Sandanme #78; 6–1	West Sandanme #20; 3–4	East Sandanme #39; 6–1	West Makushita #54; 2–5
2013	West Sandanme #19; 3–4	East Sandanme #34; 6–1	East Makushita #45; 3–1–3	East Makushita #55; 7–0; Champion	East Makushita #7; 2–5	West Makushita #19; 2–5
2014	West Makushita #36; 3–4	West Makushita #43; 4–3	East Makushita #37; 4–3	West Makushita #29; 3–4	West Makushita #37; 3–4	West Makushita #46; 3–4
2015	West Makushita #55; 3–4	West Sandanme #6; 6–1	East Makushita #33; 3–4	East Makushita #44; 5–2	West Makushita #28; 2–5	East Makushita #46; Sat out due to injury 0–0–7
2016	West Sandanme #26; 5–2	West Sandanme #1; 6–1	East Makushita #29; 4–3	West Makushita #22; 4–3	West Makushita #16; 4–3	West Makushita #12; 4–3
2017	East Makushita #8; 4–3	West Makushita #5; 3–4	West Makushita #9; 3–4	East Makushita #14; 3–4	West Makushita #18; 5–2	East Makushita #11; 4–3
2018	West Makushita #6; 3–4	East Makushita #12; 4–3	East Makushita #10; 5–2	West Makushita #4; 2–5	West Makushita #14; 5–2	East Makushita #7; 4–3
2019	West Makushita #3; 7–0; Champion	West Jūryō #10; 5–10	West Makushita #1; 3–4	West Makushita #5; 5–2	East Makushita #1; 6–1	West Jūryō #11; 5–10
2020	West Makushita #1; 6–1	West Jūryō #11; 8–7	West Jūryō #8; Tournament Cancelled; State of Emergency; 0–0–0	West Jūryō #8; 9–6	East Jūryō #3; 6–9	West Jūryō #6; 8–7
2021	East Jūryō #5; Sat out due to COVID rules 0–0–15	East Jūryō #6; 6–9	East Jūryō #9; 9–6	East Jūryō #3; 7–8	East Jūryō #3; 8–7	West Jūryō #1; 11–4
2022	East Maegashira #15; 9–6	West Maegashira #9; 9–6	West Maegashira #6; 9–6	East Maegashira #4; 6–9	East Maegashira #6; 10–5	East Maegashira #4; 10–5
2023	West Komusubi #2; 9–6	East Komusubi #1; 11–4	West Sekiwake #2; 10–5; T	West Sekiwake #2; 9–6	West Sekiwake #1; 9–6	West Sekiwake #1; 6–9
2024	East Maegashira #1; 10–5; O★	West Sekiwake #1; 9–6	East Sekiwake #1; 4–8–3	East Maegashira #2; 6–9	West Maegashira #3; 11–4	East Komusubi #1; 10–5
2025	East Sekiwake #1; 6–9	West Maegashira #1; 9–6	East Maegashira #1; 7–8	West Maegashira #1; 6–9 ★	West Maegashira #4; 9–6	West Maegashira #2; 8–7 ★
2026	West Komusubi #1; 8–7	East Komusubi #1; 3–12	East Maegashira #5; 5–10	East Maegashira #8; 6–9	East Maegashira #11; 10–5	East Maegashira #7; 13–2–P; T
Record given as wins–losses–absences Top division champion Top division runner-up Retired Non-participation Jūryō Lower divisions Sanshō key: F=Fighting spirit; O=Outstanding performance; T=Technique Also shown: ★=Kinboshi; P=Playoff(s); Divisions: Makuuchi — Jūryō — Makushita — Sandanme — Jonidan — Jonokuchi Makuuchi ranks: Yokozuna — Ōzeki — Sekiwake — Komusubi — Maegashira

== See also ==
- Glossary of sumo terms
- List of active sumo wrestlers
- List of active gold star earners
- List of active special prize winners
- List of sumo top division runners-up
- List of sekiwake
