= Ōnosato Daiki =

Japanese sumo wrestler (born 2000)

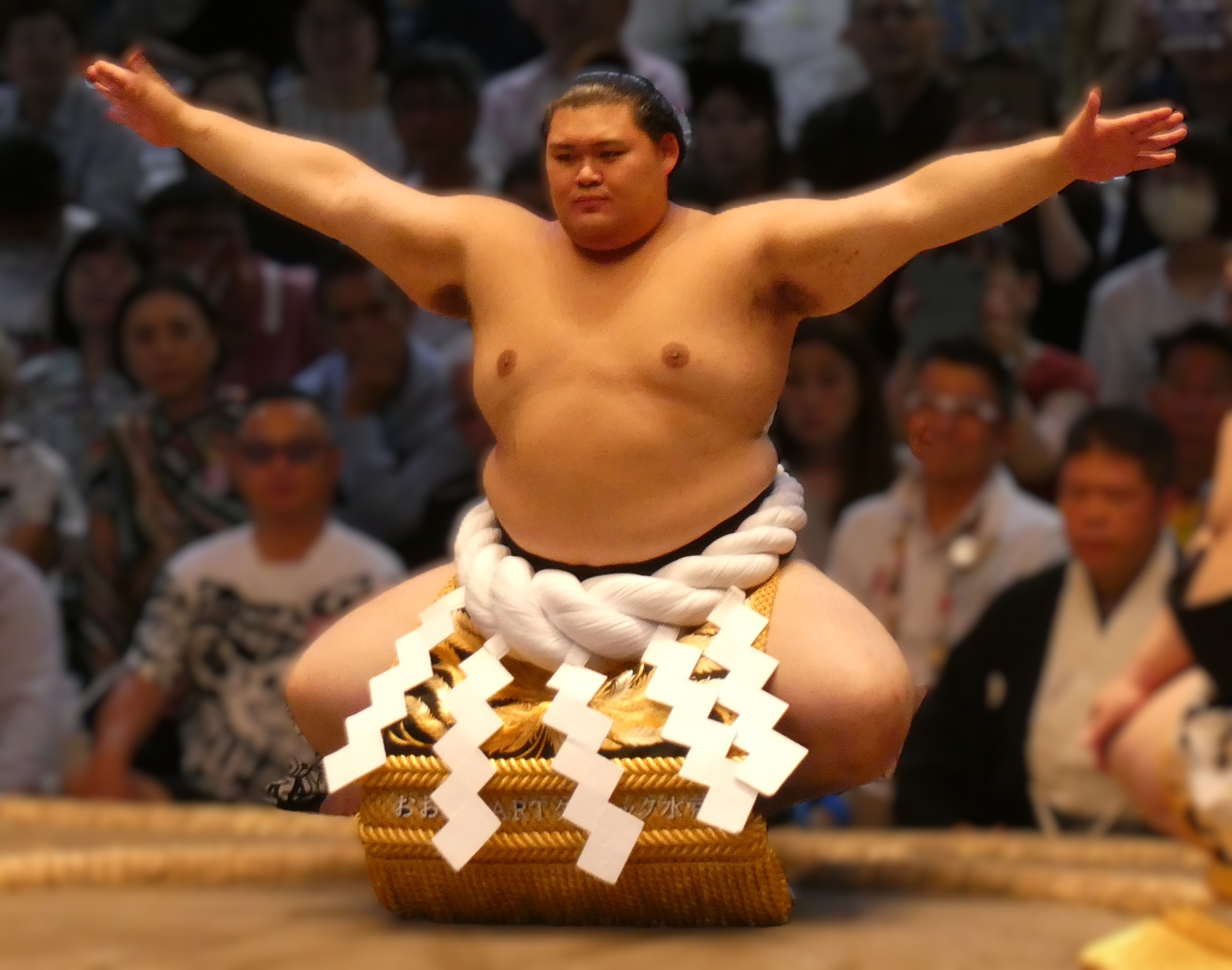
- Ōnosato in July 2025

Personal information
- Native name: 大の里 泰輝
- Born: Daiki Nakamura; June 7, 2000 (age 26) Tsubata, Ishikawa, Japan
- Height: 1.90 m (6 ft 3 in)
- Weight: 188 kg (414 lb; 29.6 st)

Sport
- Sport: Sumo
- Rank: Yokozuna
- University team: Nippon Sport Science University
- Heya: Nishonoseki
- Debut: May 2023
- Highest rank: Yokozuna (May 2025)
- Championships: Makuuchi (7)
- Special Prizes: Fighting Spirit (3); Outstanding Performance (2); Technique (3)
- Updated on November 22, 2026

Ōnosato Daiki (Japanese: 大の里 泰輝, [oːnosato daiꜜkʲi]) (born Daiki Nakamura (中村 泰輝, Nakamura Daiki), June 7, 2000) is a Japanese professional sumo wrestler and the 75th yokozuna. After a successful amateur career at university level, where he was called "the most eagerly awaited prospect to come out of collegiate sumo in decades", he joined the Nishonoseki stable under the tutelage of the former yokozuna Kisenosato and began his professional career at the rank of makushita 10 via the makushita tsukedashi system. He reached the top makuuchi division in January 2024 after competing in just four tournaments, and in May of the same year won his first top-division championship in a record seven tournaments.

Ōnosato became professional sumo's 75th yokozuna in May 2025 after winning back-to-back championships at the rank of ōzeki.

== Early life and sumo background ==
Medal record

Men's Sumo

Representing Japan

World Games
Gold medal – first place	2022 Birmingham	Openweight
Silver medal – second place	2022 Birmingham	Heavyweight

Daiki Nakamura was born in Tsubata, Ishikawa. He began wrestling in a sumo club at his elementary school in first grade. As a child he was fascinated by professional sumo and has stated that one of his favourite publications was the magazine Sumo published by Baseball Magazine. Nakamura attended Itoigawa City Nō Junior High School and Niigata Prefectural Marine High School. During his years at Itoigawa, he won the 2016 Junior High School competition at the Hakuhō Cup. At Niigata's Kaiyo High School, he took part in several training camps organised by Arashio stable, training with future makuuchi-ranked Wakamotoharu.

In 2019, he entered Nippon Sport Science University, a university famous for its strong sumo club. During his first year, he first won the individual competition in the adult division of the National Athletic Meet, hence becoming the second best individual champion in the history of the competition and allowing him to become professional at the rank of makushita tsukedashi 15. He then took part in the National Student Sumo Tournament in Sakai as a freshman and won the individual tournament. This victory, over Kindai University's Koshiro Tanioka, marked the first time in 29 years that a freshman won the tournament, since Luis Gō Ikemori (who later became a professional wrestler under the shikona of Ryūkō) won in 1990. In December 2021, he participated to the 70th All Japan Sumo Championships at the Ryōgoku Kokugikan and became amateur-yokozuna after defeating Kindai University's Kanzaki Taiga in the final, again qualifying for the makushita tsukedashi system. During that same tournament, he defeated Tottori Jōhoku High School's Tetsuya Ochiai during the team competition. During his university years, he also notably faced Mikiya Ishioka, facing him a total of four times and winning two of these matches, thus creating a rivalry between the two wrestlers.

In January 2022, Nakamura took part in the World Games sumo competition held that year in Birmingham, Alabama. Competing in the Openweight and Over 115 kg categories, he won the former and finished runner-up in the latter, failing against Hidetora Hanada. In October of the same year, he participated in the National Athletic Meet in Ōtawara and won the amateur-yokozuna title for the second consecutive time in this tournament. With his victory at the 70th All Japan Sumo Championships, Nakamura became the fourth person since the introduction of this system in 2000 to be eligible to join professional sumo at the rank of makushita tsukedashi 10. This victory was also the fifth time that Nakamura had won the championship title in a tournament counting towards makushita tsukedashi status. Overall, during his time as an amateur wrestler at university level, Nakamura won no less than 13 titles, placing him ex aequo for the greatest number of amateur titles won by a wrestler. His dominance of amateur sumo in Japan was such that sumo columnist John Gunning declared that he saw in Nakamura's sumo a continuous display of "calm smooth style reminiscent of Hakuhō in his younger days".

In March 2023, Nakamura made the decision to become a professional wrestler (rikishi) by joining Nishonoseki stable under the guidance of former yokozuna Kisenosato. At the time of his recruitment, he expressed his intention to achieve sekitori status as quickly as possible. Moreover, his entry into the professional world a few months after the record-breaking promotion of Hakuōhō (then known as Ochiai) did not fail to raise the interest of commentators as to the hypothesis of a rivalry between these two dominant wrestlers of the amateur world. On the subject of choosing to join this particular stable, Nakamura expressed his interest in being trained by a former yokozuna and that the stable, located in Ami, Ibaraki, offered him a healthy working environment "to eliminate any temptations and be able to concentrate on sumo". Since he turned professional in May 2023, Ōnosato was the last wrestler to be promoted to makushita tsukedashi 10 due to his amateur prowess, the system for promotion to the top of the makushita division having been abolished in September 2023.

== Early career ==
=== Professional debut ===
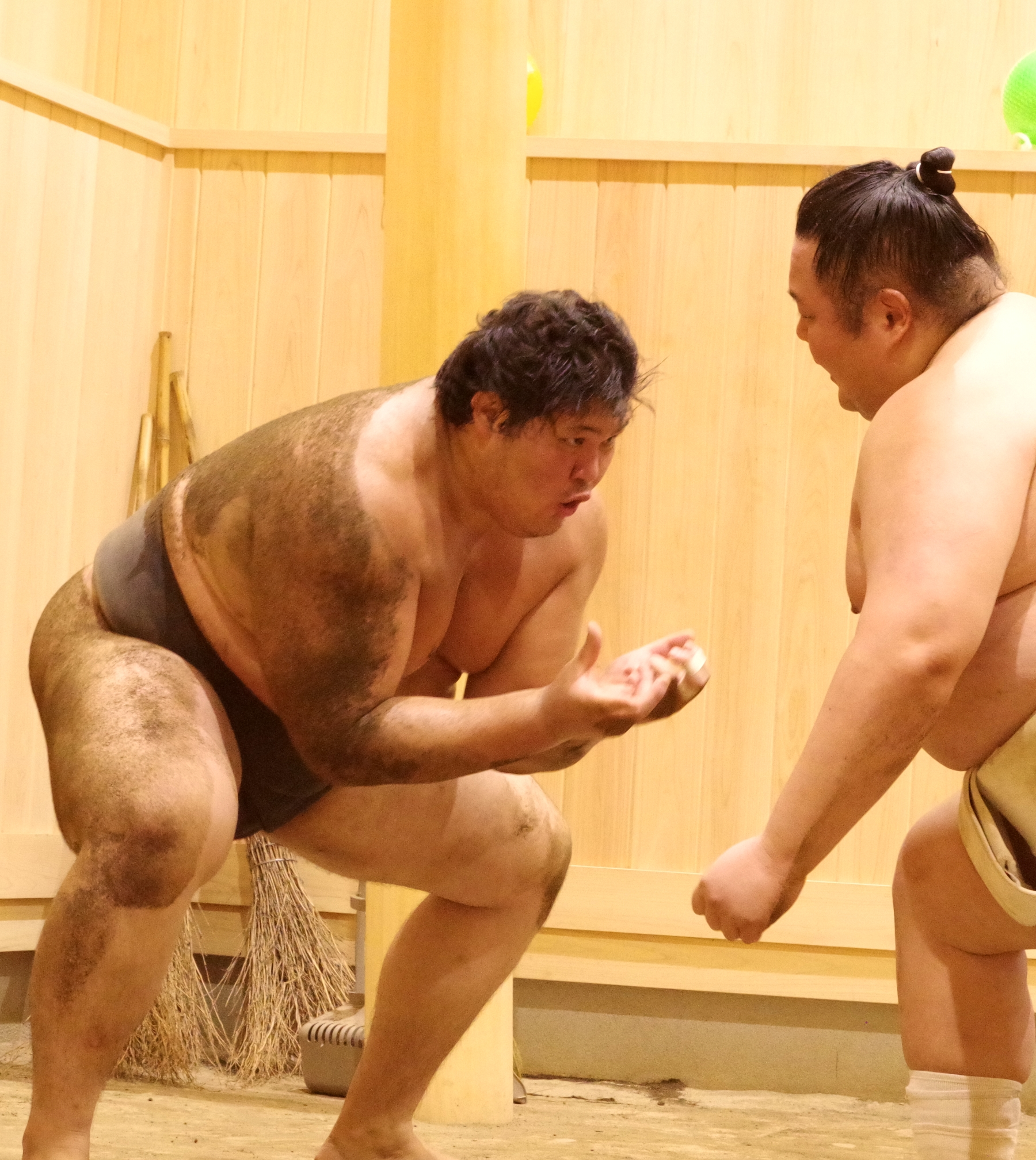
Ōnosato training with Tomokaze in August 2023

In April 2023, it was announced that Nakamura would fight under the shikona Ōnosato (大の里). This ring name is composed with the kanji for 'great' (大), to accentuate his talent, while the '-nosato' part of his name (composed with the kana and kanji "の 里") establish Nakamura's lineage from yokozuna Takanosato (隆の里) and Kisenosato (稀勢の里). This name, chosen to represent his master's expectations, was chosen in particular because this shikona had been proposed to Kisenosato when he was still an active wrestler when his promotion to the rank of ōzeki had been certain. The shikona had previously been borne by the early 20th-century ōzeki, Ōnosato Mansuke. Nakamura's father declared, "I am deeply moved by the honor of my son being named after a former ōzeki with such a long history". Before bestowing Nakamura his shikona, Kisenosato, with his former stablemate Wakanosato as intermediary, obtained permission for its use from Ōnosato Mansuke's family, who still reside in Aomori Prefecture.

On the announcement of Ōnosato's debut as a professional wrestler, his former coach at Niigata Kaiyo High, Tetsuya Tōmi, declared his satisfaction, compared him to "a Shohei Ohtani of sumo", and said that Nakamura had the potential to become the monster of the new era (新時代の怪物). On the occasion of his passage to the new apprentice examination, Ōnosato, obliged to comply with professional wrestlers dress rules, received an obi belt that his master had used.

Having received the Japan Sumo Association approval to compete, Ōnosato began his career at the rank of makushita tsukedashi 10. His first professional match was against Takasago stable wrestler Ishizaki, a senior of Ōnosato during their time at NSS University. Ishizaki however defeated Ōnosato by tsukiotoshi in what Ishizaki later describes as a "fluke match". Nonetheless, Ōnosato finished the tournament with a score of 6–1, missing out, however, on promotion directly to the jūryō division, which some observers had been expecting.

During the July tournament, Ōnosato competed again in the makushita division, this time ranked as makushita 3. He won his first two matches, but suffered his first defeat in his third match against Tokihayate. On the seventh day of the tournament, Ōnosato faced amateur scene rival and upper-division wrestler, Kihō. During their amateur bouts, Kihō never defeated Ōnosato, who had won the college yokozuna title from him at the 2022 championships. Kihō dealt Ōnosato his second consecutive defeat, with a hatakikomi. At the time, this defeat was thought to delay even further Ōnosato's promotion to jūryō. Ōnosato ultimately achieved a kachi-koshi of 4 wins in his last match by defeating Hidenoumi. Ōnosato said that his losses were unexpected and that it left him so disgusted with himself that he could not eat. Of his last match, he said that he came into it with "a bit of confidence", but that it was tough bout.

=== Jūryō promotion ===
When the rankings for the September tournament were announced, however, it was confirmed that Ōnosato's score was sufficient to promote him to jūryō, professional sumo's second-highest division. This promotion, acquired at the same time as stablemate and NSSU senior classmate Takahashi, allowed Nishonoseki stable to simultaneously receive two new sekitori, and the first two raised by Kisenosato alone since he had become master in 2019. Furthermore, this double promotion marks the first time since July 2012 that two stablemates have gained sekitori status at the same time. After his promotion, Ōnosato went to his hometown of Tsubata, Ishikawa to officially announce his promotion to his local fans. After a conference attended by around 600 people, he was presented with a stock of 600 kg (1,300 lb) of rice. During the August jungyō, he took part in public training series and competed against his jūryō peers. He was also honored to be trained later by former ōzeki Takakeishō and Takayasu, the latter having been stablemate of Ōnosato's master, and was praised for his attitude toward training.

During his first jūryō tournament, Ōnosato first recorded seven consecutive wins in seven matches with a victory over Kihō, placing him at the top of this competition. On Day 8, Ōnosato maintained his lead with an eighth consecutive victory, making him the seventh jūryō wrestler in the history of the sport to win eight in a row from day one of the competition and the first to achieve this since Takakeishō (then known as Satō) at the May 2016 tournament. Since he also followed this up with a ninth victory in a row, Ōnosato became the jūryō wrestler to win the most victories since the first day of a competition ex aequo with Naruyama at the January 1953 tournament and Shōtenrō at the November 2008 tournament. Ōnosato's winning streak ended at 9 consecutive victories, however, after he was defeated by Ichiyamamoto on the tenth day of the competition. Ōnosato managed to keep himself in the title race with Ichiyamamoto, with the championship set to be decided on the final day. Ōnosato nevertheless lost his final match to Rōga and finished just one defeat behind Ichiyamamoto, who won that month's tournament.

During the November 2023 tournament, he won his first match against a wrestler who had been ranked in the san'yaku ranks by defeating former sekiwake Aoiyama on the eighth day of the competition. Ōnosato was then able to maintain his lead throughout the tournament, recording eleven wins on day fourteen, tied with Kotoshōhō, with the championship to be decided on the final day. Although Ōnosato won his final match against Mitoryū, Kotoshōhō also kept himself in the title race by also claiming a twelfth victory. The championship was thus decided in a playoff, which Kotoshōhō won by beating Ōnosato by uwatenage, causing Ōnosato to miss out on the championship for the second consecutive tournament.

== Makuuchi ==
=== Up-and-comer ===
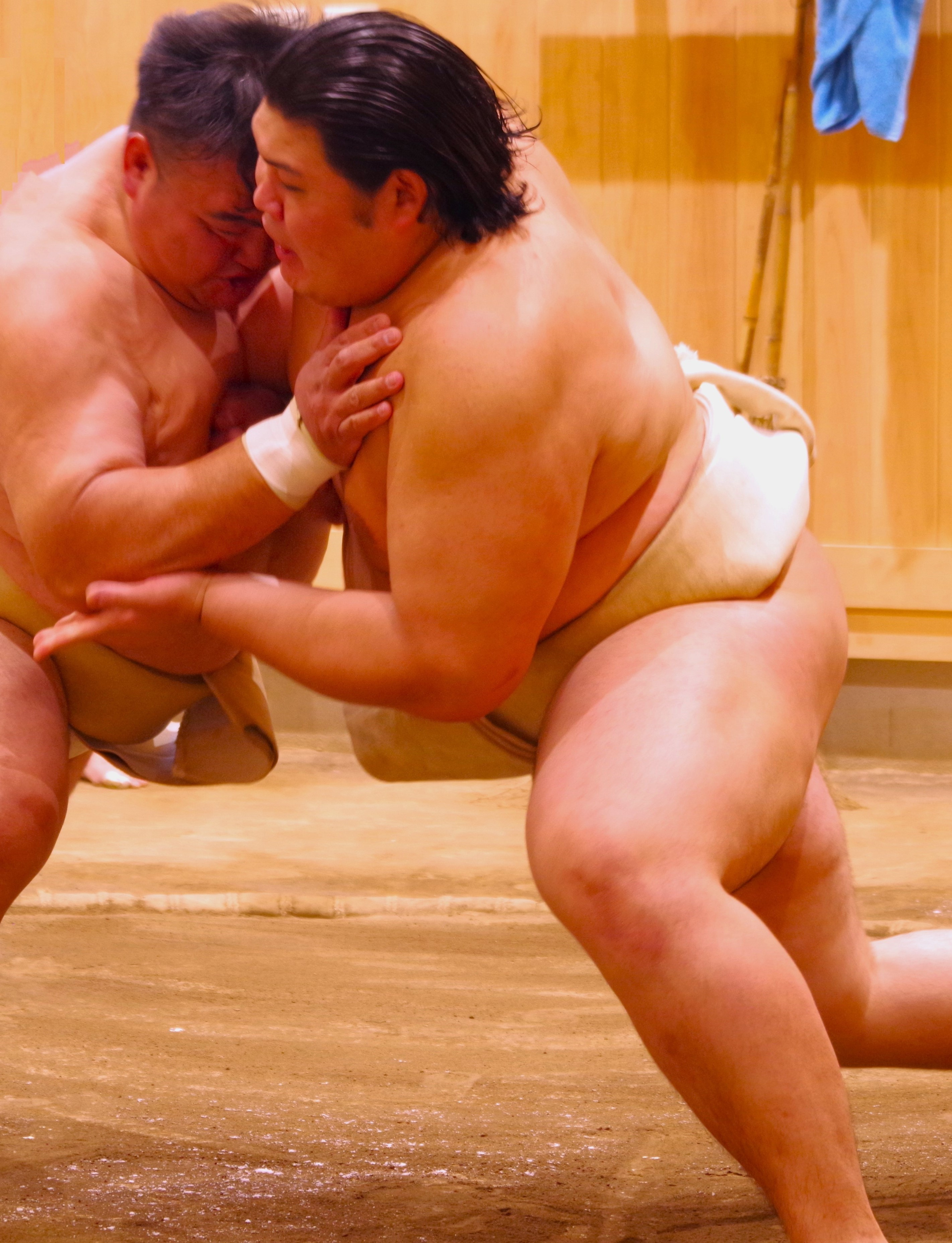
Ōnosato training with his master Nishonoseki in December 2023

After competing in just four tournaments, Ōnosato's promotion to the top makuuchi division was announced for the January 2024 tournament. The promotion made him the first recruited by the former Kisenosato to be elevated to the top division. He is also the third-fastest to reach the top division since 1989 (after Endō and Hakuōhō), doing so in four tournaments under the old tsukedashi system. Ōnosato told reporters after his promotion that he was happy to see his name in big letters at the top of the banzuke, while his stablemaster asked him to win 10 matches and the Fighting Spirit special prize in January as a reward for his arrival in the top division.

Ōnosato performed well in the first half of the tournament, however, recording a defeat on the third day against Ōnoshō. However, he maintained his position as one of the tournament's leading wrestlers by recording a sixth consecutive victory and a kachi-koshi on Day 9 against Meisei. On the tenth day, Ōnosato faced another tournament leader, Kotonowaka, however losing the match by yorikiri and leaving Kotonowaka alone in the lead in the title race. Ōnosato then suffered two consecutive defeats on Day 11 and 12, at the hands of Ōzeki Hōshōryū and Yokozuna Terunofuji, virtually eliminating him from the title race. Because he had a match against Terunofuji, Ōnosato became the first wrestler to face a yokozuna in his first makuuchi tournament in 10 years, since Ichinojō faced both yokozuna Kakuryū and Hakuhō in the September 2014 tournament. For his performances, Ōnosato was however elected by popular vote Morinaga's Wrestler of the Day Award no less than four times during the tournament. For his 11 wins in his first tournament in the top division, he was also awarded the Fighting Spirit prize. After his inaugural tournament in the top division, Ōnosato commented that he was grateful to have been able to learn from the san'yaku ranks despite suffering three consecutive defeats at the hands of the upper echelons.

During the March tournament of the same year, Ōnosato remained in the group of wrestlers leading the championship during the first week (tied with Takerufuji) nevertheless recording a defeat on the seventh day against Ōnoshō. Ōnosato managed to keep himself in the title race on Day 9 by beating a san'yaku-ranked wrestler for the first time, defeating Sekiwake Wakamotoharu. On Day 10, Ōnosato lost his match against Takerufuji, leaving the latter alone at the top of the title race with a two-win lead over the rest of the competitors. Ōnosato continued his tournament with a notable win over Ōzeki Takakeishō on Day 11. On Day 14, he maintained his chances of winning the tournament with an eleventh victory over Komusubi Abi, the yūshō to be decided on the final day in his match against Ōzeki Hōshōryū. The latter defeated Ōnosato for the second time in a row, although the championship was not at stake because an injured Takerufuji had already won a thirteenth victory to become the champion. For his prowess at the tournament, however, it was announced that Ōnosato would receive the prizes for Technique and Fighting Spirit. His second consecutive 11-win record in the top division made him a strong contender for potential san'yaku promotion in May.

On April 22, 2024, the Sumo Association announced that they had issued a strict warning to Ōnosato and his stablemaster, after the latter reported that Ōnosato drank with an underage wrestler in his stable back in September 2023. Two days later, Ōnosato apologized for his actions. He added that he was grateful to have been allowed to wrestle for the final days of the spring regional tour, which was in progress at the time.

=== San'yaku promotion and first titles ===
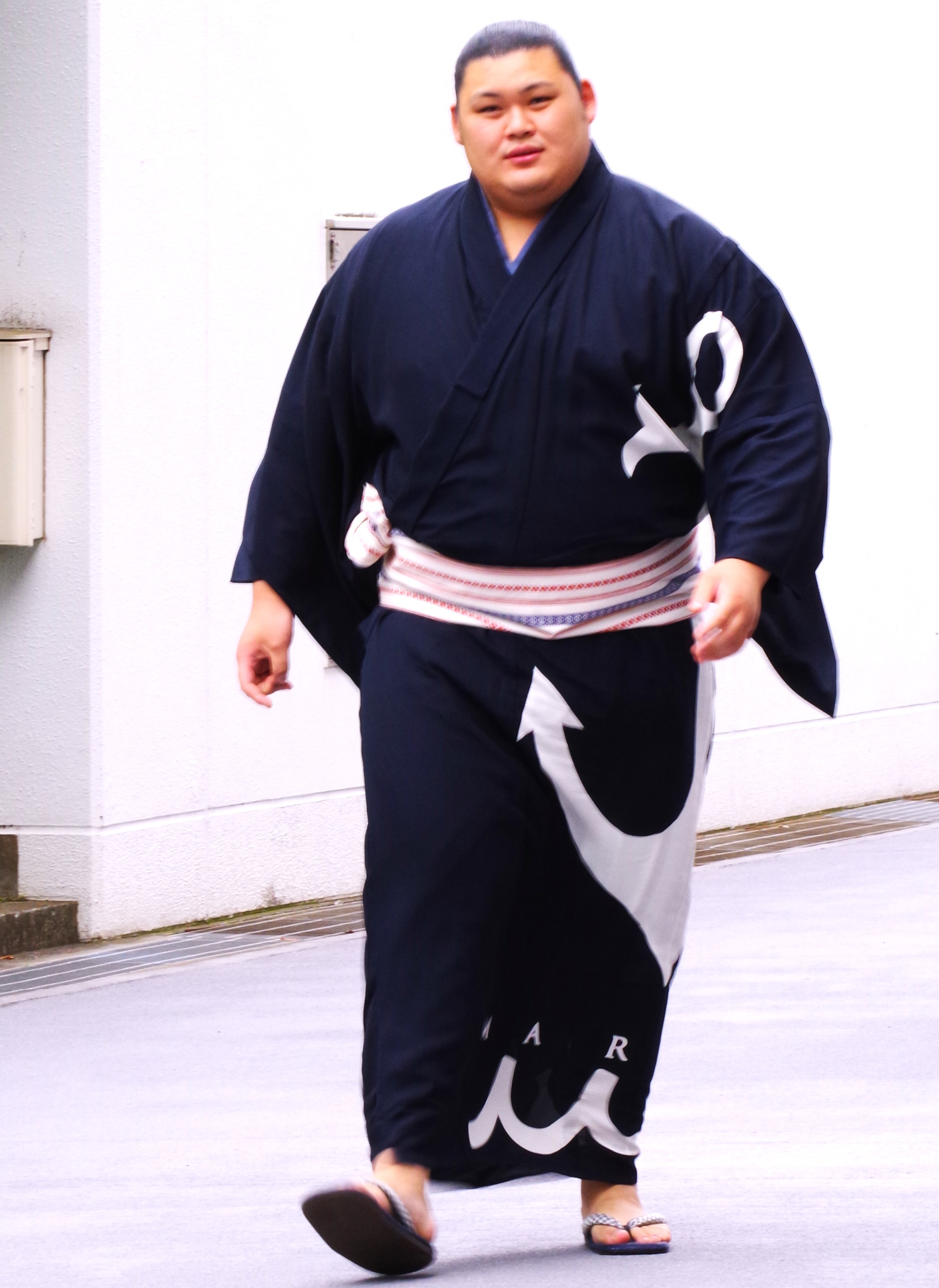
Ōnosato during the 2024 May tournament

When the banzuke for the May 2024 tournament was announced, Ōnosato was promoted to his then-highest rank, komusubi, making his debut in the san'yaku ranks in just six tournaments, the second-fastest progression to these ranks since the Shōwa era (behind the record set in five tournaments by Ichinojō). At a press conference following the publishing of the banzuke, Ōnosato was seen wearing a small topknot for the first time. His stablemaster Nishonoseki commented that he never imagined Ōnosato would rise through the ranks so quickly. Both also apologized again with regard to the previous September's drinking situation, with Ōnosato stating that he caused trouble to so many people and his stablemaster, and that the most important thing was for him to keep winning.

On the opening day of the May 2024 tournament Ōnosato faced yokozuna Terunofuji and scored an upset victory over his top-ranked opponent by sukuinage ("beltless arm throw"). Ōnosato was the only san'yaku wrestler to win on the first day of the tournament. He continued to win over higher ranked wrestlers, beating sekiwake Wakamotoharu (Day 4) and ōzeki Kirishima (Day 5) and Kotozakura (Day 6). On Day 8, he defeated one of his direct rivals, Daieishō. On the ninth day, he lost his one-win lead when he was defeated by Hiradoumi in an upset creating a tie between five wrestlers. Ōnosato climbed back into contention after that, and entered the final day of the tournament as the sole leader with 11 wins. He quickly defeated his Day 15 opponent, Abi, to avoid a playoff and clinch his first Emperor's Cup. Having won his first top-division title in seven tournaments since his debut, Ōnosato broke the speed record for a maiden top division title that had just been set by Takerufuji in the previous tournament. Ōnosato also was the first to win the top-division championship immediately after promotion to komusubi in 67 years, the last being the late Haguroyama in May 1957. Additionally, by winning two more special prizes he became the first wrestler in 25 years to win a special prize in each of his first three top-division tournaments. Ōnosato dedicated his victory to the people of Ishikawa Prefecture, who were affected by a deadly earthquake on January 1. The day after winning the Emperor's Cup he told reporters at Nishonoseki stable: "I'm happy to have won the championship, but my final goal is not here. I want to keep dashing up and go higher". He added that his stablemaster told him after his third loss that "the title is gone", and also before the final bout that he should not celebrate, even if he had won the match and the championship. Ōnosato said that those words made him feel less stressed, renewing his gratitude for joining the stable.

Following the May tournament the head of the Yokozuna Deliberation Council, Masayuki Yamauchi, commented that Ōnosato's victory was "a sign that the sumo world is about to undergo major changes", adding his belief that Ōnosato would eventually reach the ōzeki rank. The Sumo Association also downplayed rumors of a possible ōzeki promotion earlier than usual, saying that only Ōnosato's 12 wins in May would count towards the promotion requirement of 33 wins over 3 tournaments, normally tallied while a wrestler is either a komusubi or sekiwake. At the following tournament in July Ōnosato finished with nine wins, one of which was against yokozuna Terunofuji for the second time in a row. Ōnosato was awarded the Outstanding Performance prize for the second time, making him the first wrestler in sumo history to receive at least one of the special prizes in each of their first four top-division tournaments. With 21 san'yaku victories across two tournaments, Ōnosato needed at least 12 wins at the September tournament to meet the ōzeki promotion threshold.

In the September 2024 tournament, Ōnosato won eleven matches in a row out of the twelve required for promotion. The next day, the certainty of his promotion was postponed after he suffered his first defeat of the tournament in his match against former sekiwake Wakatakakage. At the end of the tournament, Ōnosato secured both his promotion to the second-highest rank in professional sumo and the championship by defeating the two participating ōzeki, Kotozakura and Hōshōryū, on days 13 and 14 respectively. The process of formalizing Ōnosato's promotion was not announced until he had won his thirteenth victory. With his victory over the two ōzeki, the press echoed that Ōnosato now represented a new elite and dominant wrestler in the professional world, also raising expectations that he would become the 74th yokozuna in the history of the sport.

=== Ōzeki ===
==== Promotion ====
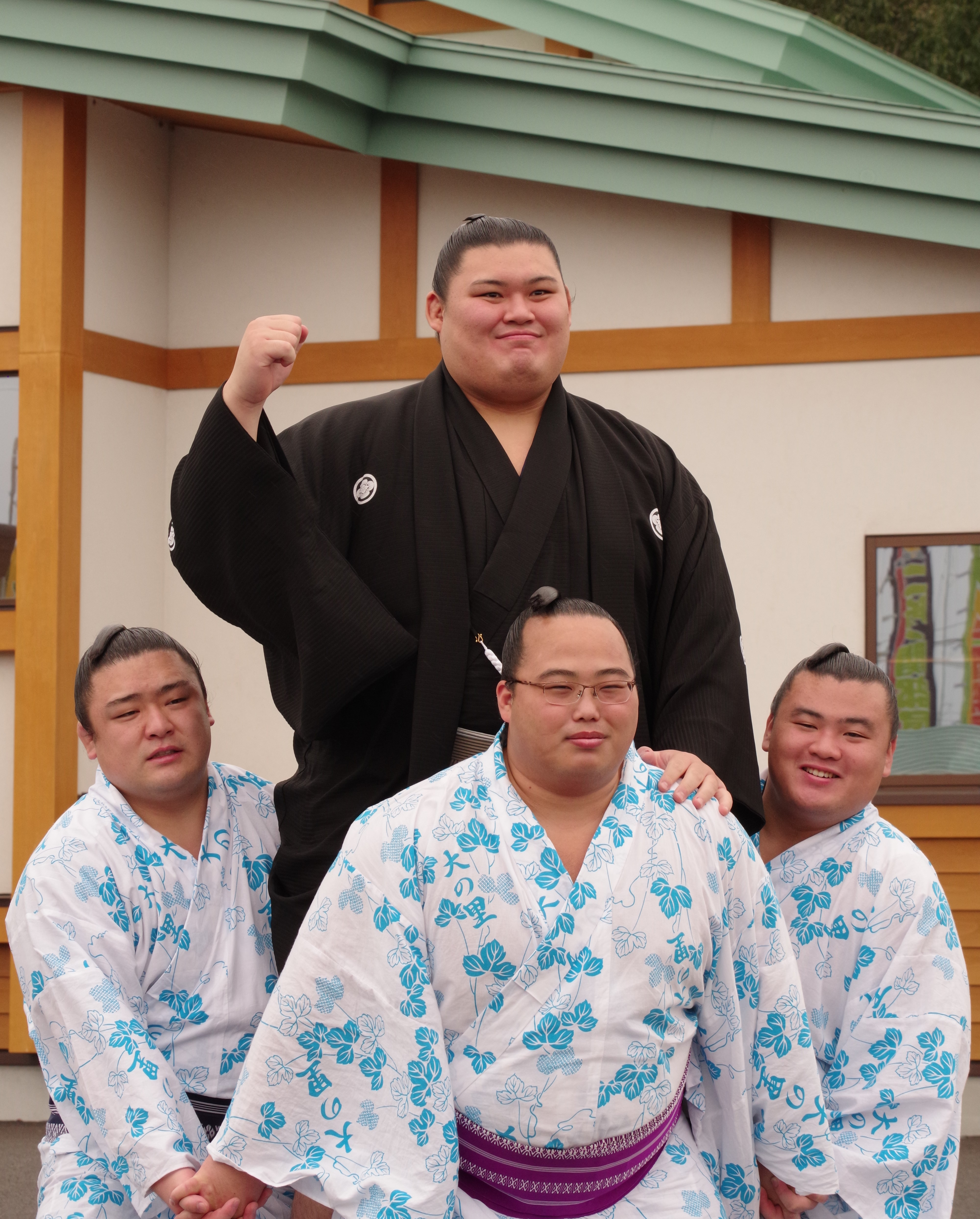
Ōnosato, after his customary ōzeki acceptance ceremony, celebrating with stablemates

On September 25, 2024, the Japan Sumo Association unanimously promoted Ōnosato to the rank of ōzeki. His promotion came after nine tournaments, the fastest for any wrestler since the current six-tournament system was implemented in 1958. He surpassed the twelve-tournament records set by Haguroyama, Yutakayama, and Miyabiyama. Following the Sumo Association's approval, elders Dewanoumi (former maegashira Oginohana) and Hanaregoma (former sekiwake Tamanoshima) delivered the news to Ōnosato at his stable in Ibaraki Prefecture. In formally accepting the promotion, Ōnosato said that he would continue to devote himself to the way of sumo, striving to become a yuiitsu-muni (唯一無二, 'one-of-a-kind' or 'unique') wrestler who does not tarnish the ōzeki rank. He later explained that he used the words yuiitsu-muni with his father in mind, after hearing that his father told others that he wanted his son to be yuiitsu-muni. Ōnosato is the first ōzeki to be promoted before his hair has grown long enough to style into an ōichō.

Ōnosato won nine matches in his ōzeki debut at the November 2024 tournament. He finished his first year in sumo's top division with 65 wins, just one behind fellow ōzeki Kotozakura for most makuuchi wins in 2024. At a reception for Nishonoseki stable following the tournament, Ōnosato said that his first tournament as an ōzeki was disappointing. He added that he wanted to continue winning and be promoted next year. Although disappointed by his results, Ōnosato was nevertheless awarded two prestigious awards with the 2024 Japan Professional Sports Grand Prize's Rookie of the Year Award, and the 2024 Wrestler of the Year award by the newspaper Sports Hochi.

==== Yokozuna run ====
During the 2025 March tournament, Ōnosato established himself as one of the competition's leaders along with Takayasu and Churanoumi, recording seven wins in the first week. On day ten, Ōnosato was alone in the lead with Takayasu, the two meeting in a match in which the latter emerged victorious. With the hazards of competition, the two wrestlers found themselves tied again until the final day of the tournament, with the two wrestlers facing off in a playoff for the championship. Ōnosato won the match by okuridashi ('rear push out').

The 2025 March title was the third for the ōzeki, and his first since his promotion to the second-highest rank in professional sumo. He also became, along with Mitakeumi, the active wrestler with the most championships to his name. With this victory, Ōnosato also found himself in a situation of promotion to the supreme rank of yokozuna should he win the May tournament, as the usual requirement for yokozuna promotion is back-to-back championships at the ōzeki rank (or a similar performance). On this subject, the chairman of the Yokozuna Deliberation Council expressed his expectations, explaining that Ōnosato had more than fulfilled the obligations of the rank of ōzeki.

During the 2025 May tournament, Ōnosato stood out as the sole leader of the competition, recording eight consecutive victories during the first half of the tournament. After Day 11, Ōnosato asserted his position as tournament leader by recording eleven consecutive wins and a two-victory lead over his nearest pursuers, further widening his gap with three victories from day twelve onwards, adding the possibility of clinching the championship in his next match. On Day 13, Ōnosato defeated fellow ōzeki Kotozakura to clinch his second straight top division championship, and his fourth title overall. The result all but assured that he will be promoted to become professional sumo's 75th yokozuna. Ōnosato told reporters after the win that he did not believe he would be able to clinch the title so early, but wanted to make sure he won his last two matches. After winning his first fourteen matches, Ōnosato nevertheless failed to secure a zenshō yūshō (perfect score championship win), suffering his only defeat to yokozuna Hōshōryū on the final day.

=== Yokozuna promotion ===
Following the May 2025 tournament, Sumo Association chairman Hakkaku (the 61st yokozuna Hokutoumi) approved the judging department's request to convene an extraordinary board meeting for the purpose of discussing Ōnosato's promotion to sumo's top rank. On May 26, 2025, the Yokozuna Deliberation Council convened and, in a meeting that lasted only six minutes, unanimously recommended that the Sumo Association promote Ōnosato to yokozuna. Council chairman and former lower house Speaker Tadamori Ōshima commented after the meeting that the opinions of the council members were "unanimous and without question," while also mentioning the yokozuna candidate's calm composure, full-body sumo and confident performance under pressure.

The Sumo Association's board of directors formally promoted Ōnosato to become sumo's 75th yokozuna on the morning of May 28, 2025. Upon his promotion, Ōnosato became the first Japanese wrestler to reach the top rank of yokozuna since his stablemaster Nishonoseki (the 72nd yokozuna Kisenosato) was promoted after the January 2017 tournament, and the second wrestler with a collegiate background to reach yokozuna after Wajima. Ōnosato's promotion occurred after a total of 13 tournaments, making him the fastest to reach the yokozuna rank since the Shōwa era (beating Haguroyama and Terukuni's 16 tournaments), and the fastest since the start of the six tournament system in 1958 (beating Wajima's 21 tournaments). Ōnosato is also the first wrestler in sumo history to post winning records in all of his tournaments leading up to yokozuna promotion.

The Sumo Association sent Dewanoumi (former maegashira Oginohana) and Hidenoyama (former ōzeki Kotoshōgiku) to Nishonoseki stable to deliver the formal news of the promotion to Ōnosato. Ōnosato gave an acceptance speech similar to the one he gave eight months earlier at his ōzeki promotion, saying that he would devote himself to training in order not to tarnish the yokozuna rank and would aim to become a yuiitsu-muni (唯一無二, 'one-of-a-kind' or 'unique') yokozuna. Speaking to reporters after the promotion, Ōnosato said that he did not originally plan to use the phrase yuiitsu-muni in his speech, but then felt it was the perfect fit. "Since entering professional sumo, I've always thought the rank of yokozuna is something I'd absolutely aim for," he said. "I'm happy to have achieved it. I think what I do from here is important." Nishonoseki added his wish that Ōnosato lead by example and "lifts the entire world of sumo," while Sumo Association president Hakkaku hoped that he "carves out a new era." After the announcement, Ōnosato also received congratulations from personalities outside sumo such as Risako Kinjo. The governor of Ishikawa Prefecture, Hiroshi Hase, also expressed his wish to award him the prefectural honorary prize.

Once the news had been delivered, the traditional preparations surrounding the exercise of the yokozuna rank began. Around 70 wrestlers from the Nishonoseki ichimon (or clan) took part in the braiding of the yokozuna's regal tsuna (rope). Expectedly, Ōnosato chose to inherit his master's Unryū ring-entering ceremony style, confiding that he had practiced several times the day before by watching videos of his master performing his own ceremony. In addition to the advice of his own master, he also benefited from the guidance of Shibatayama (former yokozuna Ōnokuni), stablemaster of the eponymous stable which belongs to the Nishonoseki ichimon, and who also trained Kisenosato to perform his own ceremony when he was promoted to professional sumo's supreme rank. On the same day, it was revealed that Ōnosato would be accompanied at his inaugural ceremony by Takayasu, as tachimochi (sword bearer), as he is a former stablemate of his master Nishonoseki, and Ryūden, as tsuyuharai (dew sweeper), as he had also served at his master's ring entry ceremonies. Finally, Ōnosato was to use a set of keshō-mawashi made for his master when the latter took part in his first tournament as yokozuna.

Because of the rains forecast for Tokyo on May 30, the public ceremony at the Meiji Shrine was cancelled. However, a ceremony was still held in the inner shrine, reserved for Sumo Association executives and relatives. It marked the first such time that the event was closed to the public, except for Terunofuji's ceremony in September 2021 which was held during the COVID-19 pandemic. Despite the closure, approximately 1,000 people showed up to the inner shrine's entrance. The following day Ōnosato performed the yokozuna dohyō-iri in public for the first time, at the retirement ceremony for former maegashira Kotoekō.

When the July 2025 rankings were published Ōnosato was listed as yokozuna-ōzeki, due to the requirement that at least two wrestlers be listed on the banzuke as ōzeki.

== Yokozuna ==
=== 2025 ===
Ōnosato suffered his first defeat as a newly-promoted yokozuna on the fourth day of the July 2025 tournament in Nagoya, giving up a kinboshi to Ōhō. Later on in the tournament, he suffered losses to rank-and-filers Hakuōhō and Tamawashi. Ōnosato conceded his fourth kinboshi on Day 13 to Kotoshōhō, which set a new record for the most gold stars given by a yokozuna in their debut at sumo's highest rank. Ōnosato was eliminated from championship contention the following day. Ōnosato was still able to win his final 2 matches of his tournament against Wakatakakage and Kotozakura to finish with 11 wins and 4 losses, including finishing as a runner up (jun-yusho) in his yokozuna debut.

During the 2025 September tournament, Ōnosato remained among the top wrestlers in the championship, conceding only one upset defeat on the fourth day against maegashira Hakuōhō. Trailing behind his fellow yokozuna Hōshōryū, Ōnosato took the lead in the competition after Hōshōryū suffered a second consecutive defeat at the hands of ōzeki Kotozakura, who also gave him a default victory on Day 14 after withdrawing due to injury. On the final day, the two yokozuna faced each other for the title, the match becoming the first time since the 2020 Osaka tournament where two yokozuna could enter a playoff situation on the final day. Hōshōryū defeated Ōnosato by oshidashi, triggering the playoff, which he then lost, when Ōnosato defeated him by yoritaoshi. The match was also the first playoff between two yokozuna since Asashōryū and Hakuhō in January 2009. During the tournament, Ōnosato won a total of 519 kenshō-kin (prize money), amounting to ¥31.14 million, surpassing the record of ¥30.901 million set by Hakuhō during the 2015 January tournament. With this championship, Ōnosato is the first Japanese wrestler to win three tournaments in a single year since Takanohana in 1997, and the first Japanese yokozuna to win a tournament since 2017, when his master Kisenosato won the March tournament.

On 7 October, Ōnosato participated in the commemorative ceremony for the centennial of the Japan Sumo Association. He performed a special sandangamae with fellow yokozuna, Hōshōryū. This was the first time since 2017 that the ceremony was performed.

During the November 2025 tournament, Ōnosato emerged as one of the leaders alongside the other yokozuna Hōshōryū and sekiwake Aonishiki. He faced Aonishiki on the thirteenth day. The outcome of the match, which saw the yokozuna emerge victorious, was controversial because Aonishiki and Ōnosato appeared to touch the ground and the outside of the ring at the same time without a mono-ii being called, prompting a reaction from the former Mainoumi (then an NHK commentator) who argued that a debate should have taken place. For his part, chief judge Takadagawa (the former Akinoshima) argued that since Aonishiki was in the air, he was the designated loser. After suffering a third defeat on the fourteenth day against ōzeki Kotozakura, Ōnosato found himself tied for the title with Hōshōryū and Aonishiki. Ahead of the final day, Ōnosato withdrew from the tournament citing a dislocation of the left acromioclavicular joint in his match against Aonishiki and requiring a month of rest. The news of his withdrawal was met with surprise, handing Hōshōryū a default win. Setting up a play-off against Aonishiki, leading to Aonishiki's first tournament win and promotion to ōzeki.

=== 2026 ===
Ōnosato's performance would continue to be affected by this left shoulder injury. At the January 2026 tournament, Ōnosato finished with a 10–5 record. At the March 2026 tournament, Ōnosato would continue to struggle with the left shoulder injury. He started the tournament with three consecutive losses, giving up kinboshi to Wakatakakage and Fujinokawa in the process. This was the first time a yokozuna had lost 3 consecutive matches from opening day since Ōnosato's master, Kisenosato, in January 2019. He withdrew from the tournament on Day 4. Despite his injury, Ōnosato made the decision to participate in the Spring Tour, though he withdrew in the middle of it. Because his shoulder was still injured, Ōnosato withdrew from the May tournament before it began. This was the first time in his career that he missed a tournament from opening day.

Ōnosato’s return to competition at the July tournament was difficult, as he recorded three losses and one win over the first four days. Furthermore, he also consistently lost to the tournament's top contenders in his bouts. On the fourteenth day, however, he managed to secure his eighth victory against ōzeki Kotozakura.

During the September tournament, Ōnosato remained among the top wrestlers in the competition with only one defeat, maintaining a two-win lead over his opponents starting in the second half of the tournament. However, his lead collapsed on the thirteenth and fourteenth days when he suffered two consecutive losses to ōzeki opponents Kirishima and Kotozakura, respectively. Now tied, Ōnosato had to defeat Aonishiki, the last remaining ōzeki, which meant that the tournament champion would be decided on the final day. Ōnosato defeated Aonishiki by tsukidashi, winning his third consecutive September tournament and his first in six tournaments.

During the November tournament, Ōnosato quickly established himself among the tournament leaders. Despite his loss to Yoshinofuji on the first day and an additional loss to Atamifuji midway through the tournament, he was among the challengers to the eventual leader, maegashira Wakamotoharu. On the thirteenth day, however, he defeated his closest rival, Wakamotoharu, putting him back in a tie for a second consecutive championship. On the final day of the tournament, Wakamotoharu and Ōnosato maintained their respective records, leading to a playoff to determine the champion. Ōnosato defeated Wakamotoharu by watashikomi and won the championship. This championship victory marked only the second time that Ōnosato had won a tournament outside of Tokyo. During the traditional post-tournament interview, he revealed that he was aiming for the triple crown in the January tournament—a feat no yokozuna had achieved since the 2014–2015 season, when Hakuhō won the November, January, and March tournaments.

== Fighting style ==
Ōnosato has shown a preference for yotsu techniques which involve grasping his opponent's mawashi, or belt. His most common kimarite or winning move are yorikiri force-out wins. His preferred grip is listed as migi-yotsu, meaning a right arm inside and left hand outside position. He is also using significant percentage of oshi-sumo pushing and thrusting techniques.

In May 2025, prior to Ōnosato clinching that month's top division championship and securing his promotion to yokozuna, sumo commentator John Gunning suggested that Ōnosato was increasingly looking like a cross between two former wrestlers who reached sumo's top rank: the 65th yokozuna Takanohana, and Musashigawa (the 67th yokozuna Musashimaru).

== Personal life ==
Ōnosato is the eldest in his family and has a younger sister. He maintains a long friendship with Shirokuma, with whom he shared his university and professional years. The two often go to restaurants together during tournaments, with Ōnosato making fun of Shirokuma's ring name by repeatedly calling him "polar bear-san".

On February 6, 2024, Ōnosato was part of a delegation of wrestlers from Ishikawa Prefecture sent after the 2024 Noto earthquake (along with Endō, Kagayaki and former Tochinonada); charged with symbolically presenting Governor Hiroshi Hase with the sums raised during the January tournament and donations from the Sumo Association, since the presence of sumo wrestlers is considered a good omen. During his stay, he also paid a visit to the evacuation center that had housed his grandfather, receiving numerous messages of congratulations from the disaster victims for his recent sporting achievements.

== Career record ==
Ōnosato Daiki
Year	January Hatsu basho, Tokyo	March Haru basho, Osaka	May Natsu basho, Tokyo	July Nagoya basho, Nagoya	September Aki basho, Tokyo	November Kyūshū basho, Fukuoka
2023	x	x	Makushita tsukedashi #10; 6–1	East Makushita #3; 4–3	East Jūryō #14; 12–3	East Jūryō #5; 12–3–P
2024	West Maegashira #15; 11–4; F	West Maegashira #5; 11–4; FT	West Komusubi #1; 12–3; OT	West Sekiwake #1; 9–6; O	West Sekiwake #1; 13–2; FT	West Ōzeki #2; 9–6
2025	West Ōzeki #2; 10–5	East Ōzeki #1; 12–3–P	East Ōzeki #1; 14–1	West Yokozuna-Ōzeki #1; 11–4	East Yokozuna #1; 13–2–P	East Yokozuna #1; 11–4
2026	West Yokozuna #1; 10–5	West Yokozuna #1; 0–4–11	West Yokozuna #1; Sat out due to injury 0–0–15	West Yokozuna #1; 9–6	East Yokozuna #1; 12–3	East Yokozuna #1; 13–2–P
Record given as wins–losses–absences Top division champion Top division runner-up Retired Non-participation Jūryō Lower divisions Sanshō key: F=Fighting spirit; O=Outstanding performance; T=Technique Also shown: ★=Kinboshi; P=Playoff(s); Divisions: Makuuchi — Jūryō — Makushita — Sandanme — Jonidan — Jonokuchi Makuuchi ranks: Yokozuna — Ōzeki — Sekiwake — Komusubi — Maegashira

== Honours ==
- Japan Professional Sports Grand Prize's Rookie of the Year Award (2024).

== See also ==
- Glossary of sumo terms
- List of active sumo wrestlers
- List of sumo record holders
- List of active special prize winners
- List of sumo top division champions
- List of sumo top division runners-up
- List of yokozuna

Preceded by Hōshōryū Tomokatsu	75th Yokozuna; 2025–present	Succeeded by Most recent
Yokozuna is not a successive rank, and more than one wrestler can hold the title at once
