= Sōkokurai Eikichi =

Mongolian Chinese sumo wrestler

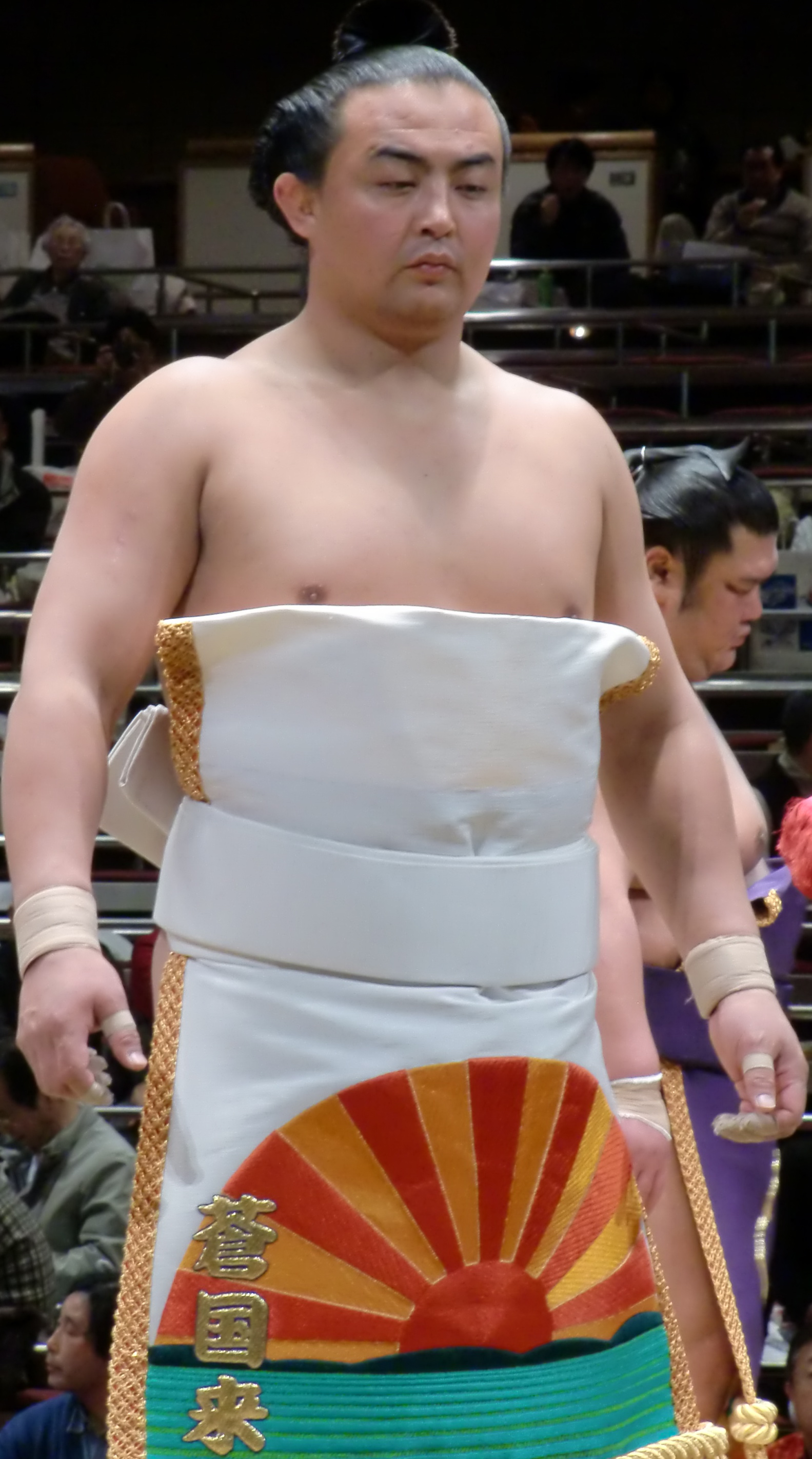
- Eikichi in 2010

Personal information
- Native name: 蒼国来 栄吉
- Born: Enkhtuvshin; January 9, 1984 (age 42) Inner Mongolia, China
- Height: 1.86 m (6 ft 1 in)
- Weight: 145 kg (320 lb; 22 st 12 lb)

Sport
- Sport: Sumo
- Retired: March 2020
- Heya: Arashio
- Record: 466-440-49
- Debut: September 2003
- Highest rank: Maegashira 2 (March 2017)
- Elder name: Arashio
- Championships: 1 Jūryō; 1 makushita 1 sandanme 1 jonokuchi
- Special Prizes: Technique (1)
- Gold Stars: 1 (Harumafuji)
- Updated on Aug 5, 2020

Sōkokurai Eikichi (蒼国来栄吉; born 9 January 1984 as Enkhtuvshin (Chinese: 恩和图布新, Mongolian: Энхтүвшин)) is a sumo elder and stable owner from Inner Mongolia, China. He is the first Chinese national to reach the top makuuchi division. Sōkokurai is ethnic Mongol. He made his professional debut in 2003 and was promoted to the top division in September, 2010.

In April 2011 Sōkokurai was ordered to retire by the Japan Sumo Association after being found guilty of involvement in match-fixing. Refusing to do so, he was dismissed. However, in March 2013 his dismissal was nullified by the Tokyo District Court. After the Sumo Association decided not to appeal the decision, he reappeared on the banzuke in July 2013 at the Nagoya Basho, ranked as a maegashira 15, the rank he was at when he was expelled. His highest rank of maegashira 2 was achieved in March 2017. He won one special prize for Technique and one gold star for beating a yokozuna.

In 2019 Sōkokurai acquired Japanese citizenship and retired after the March 2020 tournament to take over Arashio stable.

== Early life and sumo background ==
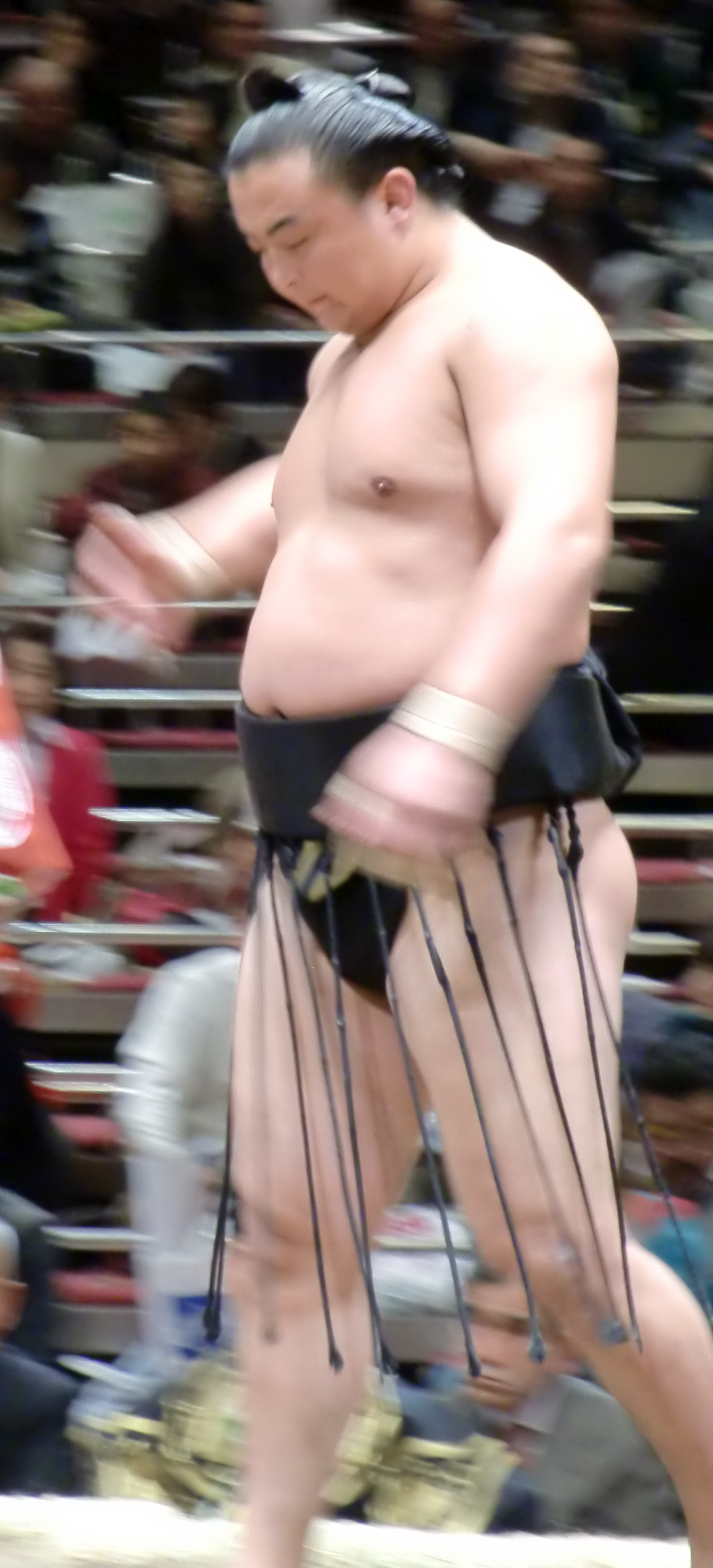
Sōkokurai in his debut tournament as a sekitori in January 2010

Enkhtuvshin was born to a livestock farmer and as a child tended farm animals in a yurt. From the age of seven, he began participating in bökh, and at the age of 16 he won the national championship in this sport. He then joined a national wrestling school where at 84 kilograms he achieved eighth place in the national junior rankings. He was scouted in April 2003 by the former komusubi Ōyutaka, head of Arashio stable, who was visiting China in search of new recruits. He moved to Japan to join this stable in June of the same year, and made his debut in the September tournament.

== Career ==
In the very next tournament in November 2003, he won the jonokuchi championship. However he was forced to sit out the following January 2004 tournament due to a broken arm. He returned in the next tournament and achieved a perfect 7–0 record in the jonidan division, losing the division championship to lower ranked veteran Kenō. He reached the third highest makushita division in one year after his debut. He began to struggle however, and spent the next three moving up and down the ranks of the sandanme and makushita divisions. A relative lightweight, he was often forced out rather easily by his heavier opponents. He had trouble adjusting to Japanese life at first, especially the diet. He was known to put yogurt on his rice to make it more palatable. His fortunes began to take a turn starting in May 2007 where took the sandanme championship. After another year of mediocre performances, which were exacerbated by a duodenal ulcer, he managed a 6–1 record in the July 2008 tournament and vied for the makushita championship in which he was eliminated in a seven-man playoff.

Following a 2–5 record in the last tournament of 2008, he began an uninterrupted string of tournaments in which he achieved a majority of wins, and in November 2009 he was promoted to the second highest jūryō division. He was only the second wrestler registered as Chinese to be promoted to sekitori status, following the wrestler Kiyonohana 36 years earlier. However, Kiyonohana was actually born and raised in Ōsaka and only listed his birthplace as Fujian out of respect for his ancestry, which made Sōkokurai the first true Chinese national to achieve a jūryō rank. After four tournaments in jūryō he made his debut in makuuchi in September 2010. Though his recent record had been worthy of promotion, his debut in makuuchi was somewhat earlier and at a higher rank than it normally would have been due to the recent demotions of several upper ranked wrestlers because of gambling allegations, so he had to prove he deserved his promotion. He took a strong step in this direction, by securing a majority of wins on the final day of the tournament, and gaining his eleventh consecutive kachi-koshi.

=== Expulsion ===
In April 2011 he was ordered to retire by the Japan Sumo Association after an investigation concluded he had been involved in fixing the result of matches. Sōkokurai and Mongolian rikishi Hoshikaze were not originally in the main group of 23 wrestlers who were found guilty, but subsequent investigations concluded that they had indeed been involved. Both wrestlers protested their innocence and refused to comply and hand in their retirement papers, and sources from Arashio stable made it clear Sōkokurai was prepared to go to court if he was thrown out of sumo. He was supported by his stablemaster, who said "I believe Sōkokurai and I have just got to let him do as he wants now." On April 14 both Sōkokurai and Hoshikaze were dismissed by the Sumo Association. Sōkokurai was still entitled to collect his retirement money, believed to have been around 5.3 million yen.

In June 2011 Sōkokurai and the Sumo Association reached a deal by which he would be paid the equivalent of a makuuchi wrestler's salary for the next year. However, he still filed a suit demanding his reinstatement to sumo. The Japan Sumo Association told him not to live or train at Arashio stable, but his stablemaster continued to support him, allowing him to attend training sessions as a "consultant", in defiance of the JSA. In 2012, Sōkokurai was working as a chicken farmer in Fukuoka, but he returned to training with the help of some former supporters. This mainly involved working out at gyms on his own, and with a rugby team.

=== Reinstatement ===
In March 2013 he won his court case against the Sumo Association, after the Tokyo District Court ruled his dismissal was invalid because the testimony of former wrestler Kasuganishiki was questionable. Sōkokurai's lawyer urged the Sumo Association to reinstate him as quickly as possible, and following a meeting on April 3 with the Sumo Association's head Kitanoumi, it was announced that the Sumo Association would not appeal the ruling and that Sōkokurai would appear on the July banzuke at maegashira 15, giving him time to return to full fitness. Sōkokurai told reporters ahead of the Nagoya tournament that he could not bear to watch sumo on TV during his absence and had had trouble sleeping at night, but he was now in good condition and would "go all out."

=== Later career ===
In his return tournament, he managed a 6–9 record but this was not enough for him to avoid relegation to the second division. After four tournaments in jūryō culminating in an 11–4 record at jūryō 9 in March 2014 he gained repromotion to the top division. He maintained his makuuchi status and in May 2015 a new high of maegashira 7 but after being forced to withdraw from the tournament through injury he dropped back to jūryō. A 9–6 record in July saw him return to makuuchi for the September tournament, and a run of three consecutive winning records in the top division for the first time saw him reach his highest rank to date of maegashira 4 in the March 2016 tournament. After four consecutive losing records saw him fall to maegashira 14, he responding by winning his first five matches in the November 2016 tournament, eventually finishing on 9–6.

In January 2017, wrestling at maegashira 10 he produced a career-best performance: wins over Mitakeumi, Takayasu and Takanoiwa in the last three days saw him finish runner-up to Kisenosato with a 12–3 record. His performance saw him being awarded the special prize for Technique. At 33 he was one of the oldest first-time award winners. In the following tournament in March he upset yokozuna Harumafuji to earn a kinboshi or gold star, but he finished on 4–11. Disappointing results in May and July saw him relegated back to jūryō for the September 2017 tournament. However he ended the year on a high note by winning his first jūryō division championship in November with a 14–1 record, and he was promoted back to the top division for the January 2018 tournament.

He injured his right foot in winning his match on the 11th day of the March 2018 tournament and had to withdraw. His resulting 5–7–3 record saw him demoted to jūryō once more. Ranked at Jūryō 1 in May 2018, he withdrew on Day 9 having lost five of his first eight bouts. The same injury kept him out of the following tournament in July. Eventually demoted again, he went on to win the makushita division championship at the November 2018 basho with a perfect 7–0 record and his promotion back to jūryō was confirmed shortly after the tournament.

== Becoming Arashio Oyakata ==
In September 2019 he acquired Japanese citizenship, which enabled him to stay in sumo as an elder of the Sumo Association after his retirement. He timed the move to coincide with retirement of his stablemaster Ōyutaka Masachika who was approaching 65 years of age, with Sōkokurai widely believed to be lined up as his successor. The move was confirmed by the Japan Sumo Association on March 26, 2020, with the announcement that Sōkokurai had retired and become Arashio Oyakata. He was listed on the May banzuke (subsequently re-used for the July tournament) despite his retirement, as the rankings had already been drawn up.

In October 2020 he criticized the Chinese government's policy of making Mandarin Chinese the language of instruction in Inner Mongolia's schools.

On 1 January 2021, the Sumo Association announced that Sōkokurai had tested positive for COVID-19. He, along with other members of Arashio Stable, were tested following the positive result of top division wrestler Wakatakakage the previous day. A total of twelve people in the stable were confirmed to have contracted the virus.

Sōkokurai's danpatsu-shiki (retirement ceremony) was held on 2 October 2022 at the Ryōgoku Kokugikan.

== Fighting style ==
Sōkokurai managed to increase his weight by about 40 kg (88 lb) since joining professional sumo and was around 130 kg (290 lb) as of 2010. He was primarily a yotsu sumo wrestler, preferring to fight at close quarters rather than push or thrust. He used a migi-yotsu (right hand inside, left hand outside) grip on his opponent's mawashi. He was fond of throws, both overarm (uwatenage) and underarm (shitatenage). However, his most common winning kimarite was yori-kiri (force out).

== Career record ==
Sōkokurai Eikichi
Year	January Hatsu basho, Tokyo	March Haru basho, Osaka	May Natsu basho, Tokyo	July Nagoya basho, Nagoya	September Aki basho, Tokyo	November Kyūshū basho, Fukuoka
2003	x	x	x	x	(Maezumō)	West Jonokuchi #36; 7–0; Champion
2004	West Jonidan #25; Sat out due to injury 0–1–6	East Jonidan #96; 7–0–P	East Sandanme #87; 5–2	West Sandanme #54; 5–2	East Sandanme #29; 6–1	East Makushita #48; 2–5
2005	East Sandanme #7; 3–4	East Sandanme #23; 3–4	West Sandanme #39; 3–4	West Sandanme #54; 6–1	West Sandanme #3; 3–4	West Sandanme #16; 6–1
2006	West Makushita #39; 4–3	West Makushita #33; 5–2	West Makushita #21; 2–5	West Makushita #35; 3–4	East Makushita #47; 2–5	East Sandanme #4; 4–3
2007	East Makushita #54; 4–3	West Makushita #46; 3–4	East Sandanme #1; 7–0–P; Champion	East Makushita #11; 5–2	East Makushita #5; 4–3	East Makushita #2; 3–4
2008	West Makushita #6; 4–3	West Makushita #4; 2–5	West Makushita #14; 2–5	West Makushita #28; 6–1–P	East Makushita #10; 4–3	West Makushita #4; 2–5
2009	West Makushita #18; 4–3	East Makushita #14; 5–2	East Makushita #6; 4–3	West Makushita #4; 4–3	West Makushita #1; 4–3	East Makushita #1; 5–2
2010	West Jūryō #13; 9–6	West Jūryō #7; 8–7	West Jūryō #4; 8–7	East Jūryō #3; 8–7	West Maegashira #13; 8–7	East Maegashira #13; 6–9
2011	East Maegashira #16; 8–7	West Maegashira #15; Tournament Cancelled; Match fixing investigation 0–0–0	Expelled	x	x	x
2012	x	x	x	x	x	x
2013	x	x	Reinstated	West Maegashira #15; 6–9	East Jūryō #1; 4–11	West Jūryō #7; 5–10
2014	East Jūryō #11; 8–7	East Jūryō #9; 11–4	West Maegashira #15; 8–7	West Maegashira #13; 7–8	West Maegashira #13; 7–8	West Maegashira #14; 9–6
2015	East Maegashira #10; 6–9	West Maegashira #13; 9–6	East Maegashira #7; 1–4–10	East Jūryō #2; 9–6	West Maegashira #14; 8–7	East Maegashira #10; 9–6
2016	West Maegashira #5; 8–7	West Maegashira #4; 5–8–2	East Maegashira #9; 7–8	West Maegashira #9; 6–9	East Maegashira #11; 5–10	East Maegashira #14; 9–6
2017	West Maegashira #10; 12–3; T	East Maegashira #2; 4–11 ★	West Maegashira #8; 5–10	West Maegashira #13; 6–9	East Jūryō #1; 4–11	West Jūryō #7; 14–1; Champion
2018	East Maegashira #12; 6–9	East Maegashira #15; 5–7–3	East Jūryō #1; 3–6–6	East Jūryō #10; Sat out due to injury 0–0–15	East Makushita #9; 4–3	East Makushita #5; 7–0; Champion
2019	West Jūryō #12; 8–7	West Jūryō #7; 8–7	West Jūryō #5; 7–8	West Jūryō #5; 4–11	West Jūryō #10; 8–7	East Jūryō #9; 7–8
2020	East Jūryō #10; 4–11	East Makushita #1; Sat out due to injury 0–0–7	West Makushita #41; Tournament Cancelled; State of Emergency; 0–0–0	West Makushita #41; Retired –	x	x
Record given as wins–losses–absences Top division champion Top division runner-up Retired Non-participation Jūryō Lower divisions Sanshō key: F=Fighting spirit; O=Outstanding performance; T=Technique Also shown: ★=Kinboshi; P=Playoff(s); Divisions: Makuuchi — Jūryō — Makushita — Sandanme — Jonidan — Jonokuchi Makuuchi ranks: Yokozuna — Ōzeki — Sekiwake — Komusubi — Maegashira

== See also ==
- Glossary of sumo terms
- List of sumo elders
- List of past sumo wrestlers
- List of non-Japanese sumo wrestlers
- List of sumo second division champions
- List of sumo top division runners-up
