= Arashio stable =

Stable of sumo wrestlers

Coordinates: 35.6868°N 139.7884°E

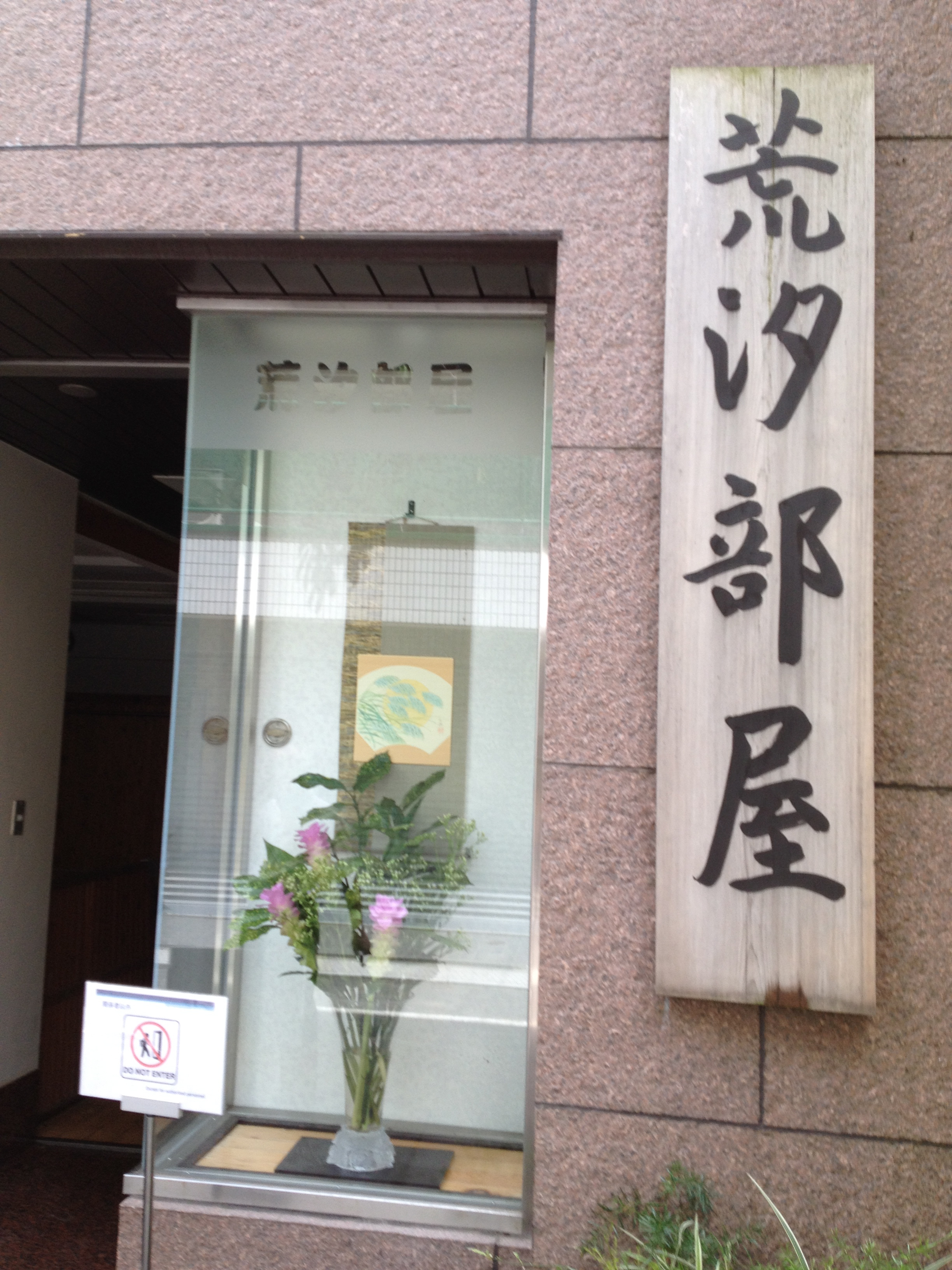
Front entrance of stable, 2014

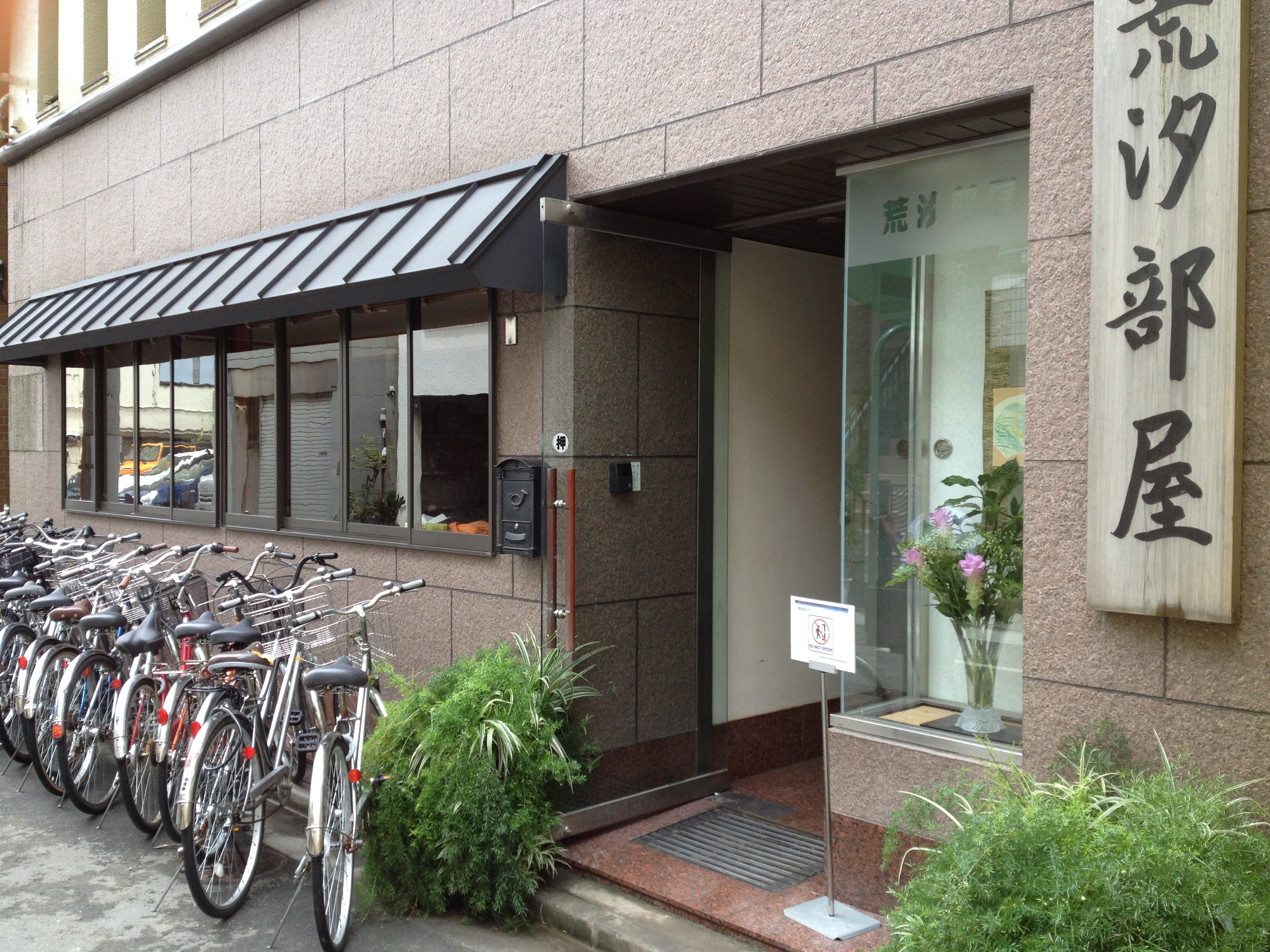
Front entrance of stable, 2014

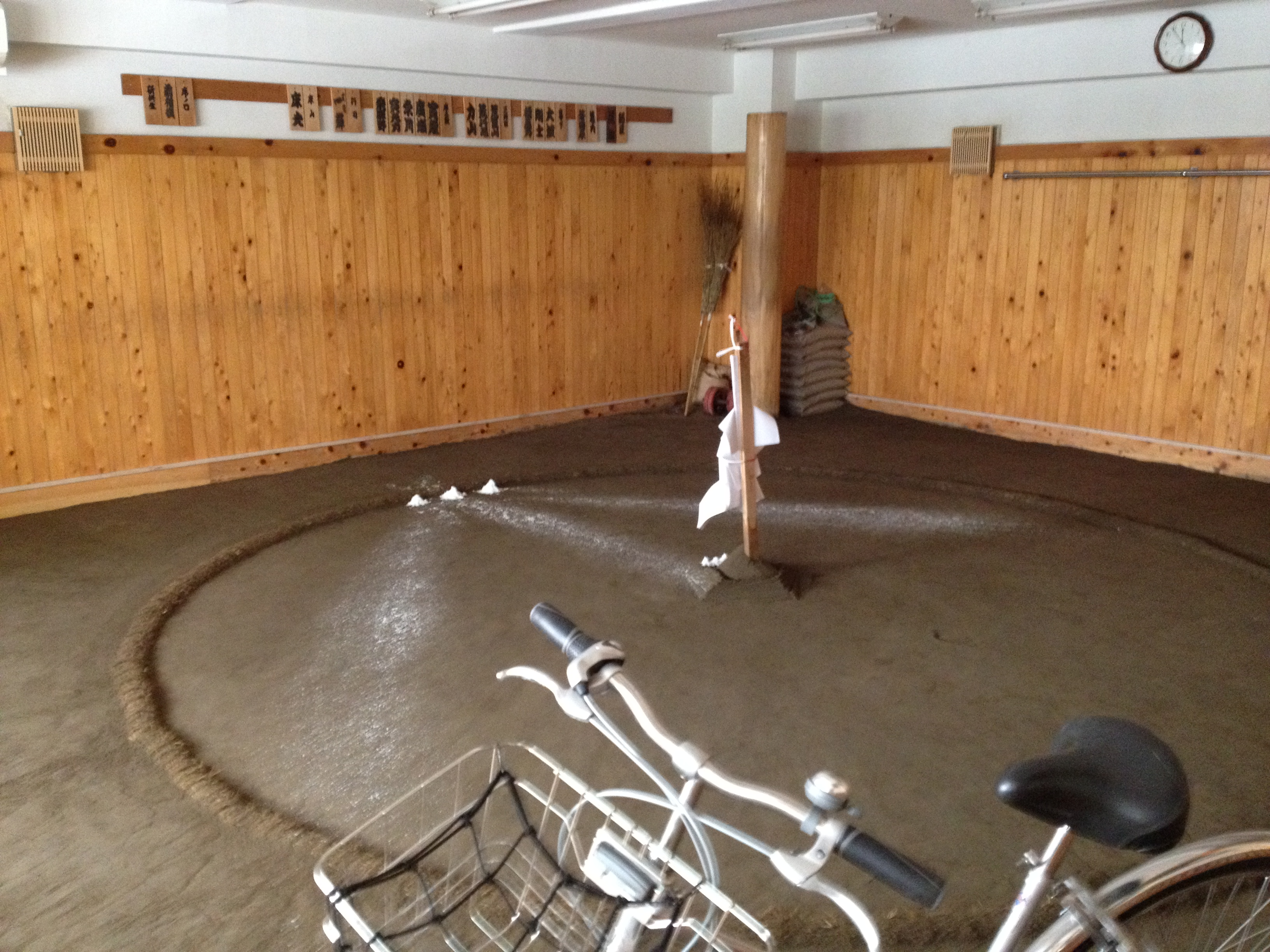
The stable's practice ring, 2014

Arashio stable (荒汐部屋, Arashio-beya) is a stable of sumo wrestlers, part of the Tokitsukaze ichimon or group of stables. It was set up in June 2002 by former komusubi Ōyutaka, who branched off from Tokitsukaze stable. At the end of 2009 the stable produced its first sekitori, the Chinese born (but ethnic Mongolian) Sōkokurai who in 2013 returned to active sumo after a two-year absence when his dismissal for match-fixing was nullified by the courts. The stable is home to the half-Japanese, half-Filipino wrestler Kōtokuzan. The stable's second sekitori, Wakatakakage, reached jūryō in May 2018, and the makuuchi division for the first time in November 2019. In the July 2021 honbasho he became the first wrestler from the stable to reach the rank of komusubi. In the January 2022 honbasho, Wakatakakage became the first wrestler from the stable to reach the rank of sekiwake. Wakatakakage won the March 2022 and May 2026 honbasho.

Apart from its human residents, the Arashio was home to the cats Moru and Mugi, former strays which were adopted by the stable. Mugi died in 2019.

In March 2020 Sōkokurai became the new Arashio when his stablemaster reached the mandatory retirement age of 65.

The stable is a popular one for sumo fans to visit, as photos with the wrestlers are available, and there is a large window to view training from outside.

In April 2024, the stable absorbed two wrestlers as well as coach Urakaze, who transferred from the former Michinoku stable.

As of May 2026, the stable has 16 active wrestlers.

== Owner ==
- 2020–present: 9th Arashio Eikichi (iin, maegashira Sōkokurai, born 1984)
- 2002–2020: 8th Arashio Shūji (komusubi Ōyutaka, born 1955)

== Coach ==
- Urakaze Tomimichi (iin, maegashira Shikishima, born 1970)

== Assistant ==
- Wakatakamoto (wakaimonogashira, makushita 7, real name Wataru Onami, born 1991)

== Notable active wrestlers ==
- Wakatakakage (best rank sekiwake)
- Wakamotoharu (best rank sekiwake)
- Kōtokuzan (best rank maegashira)
- Daiseizan (best rank maegashira)
- Tanji (best rank jūryō)

== Notable former wrestlers ==
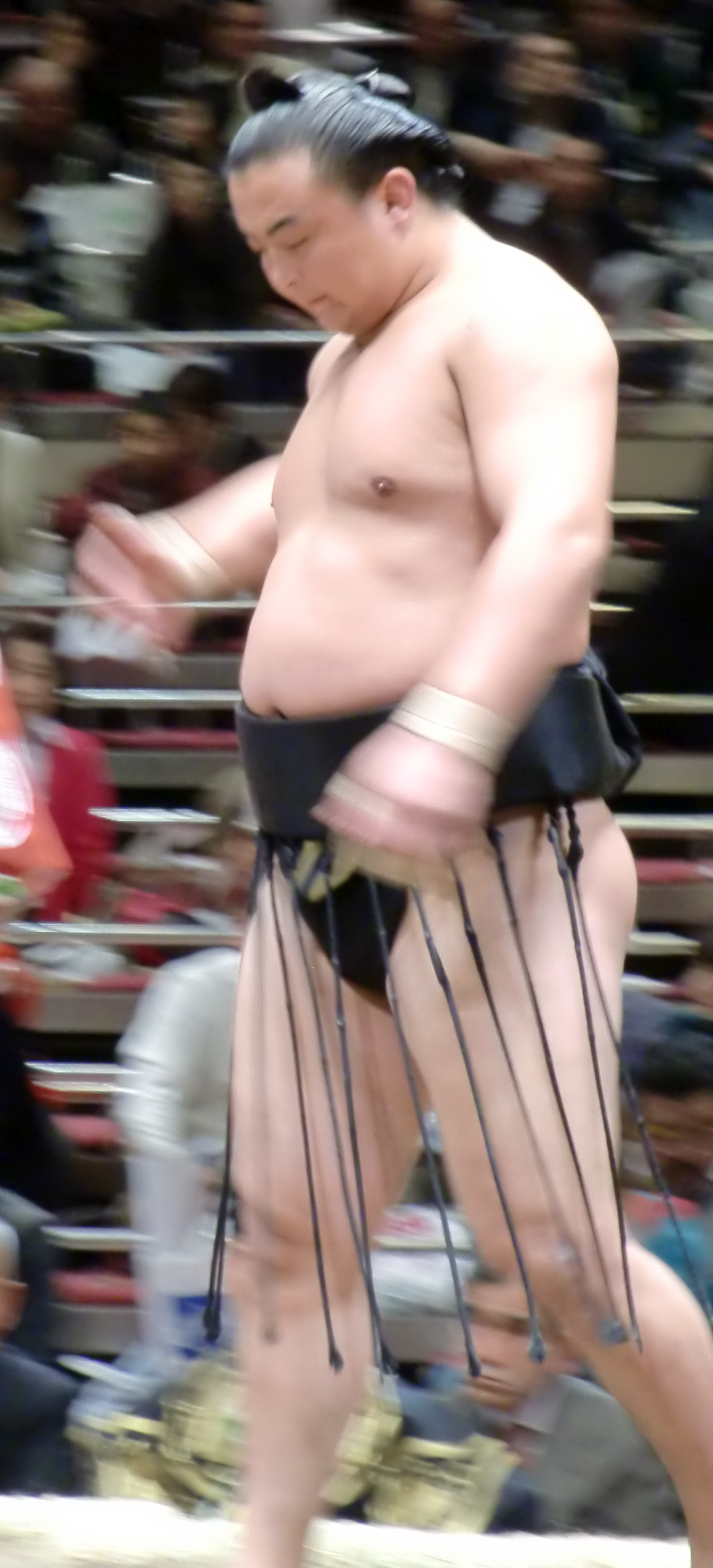
The stable's first sekitori, Sōkokurai

- Sōkokurai (maegashira 2, born 1984)

== Referee ==
- Shikimori Kazuki (jūryō gyōji, real name Kazuki Sasai, born 1987)

== Hairdresser ==
- Tokojin (first class tokoyama, born 1966)
- Tokomitsu (third class tokoyama, born 1995)

== Location and access ==
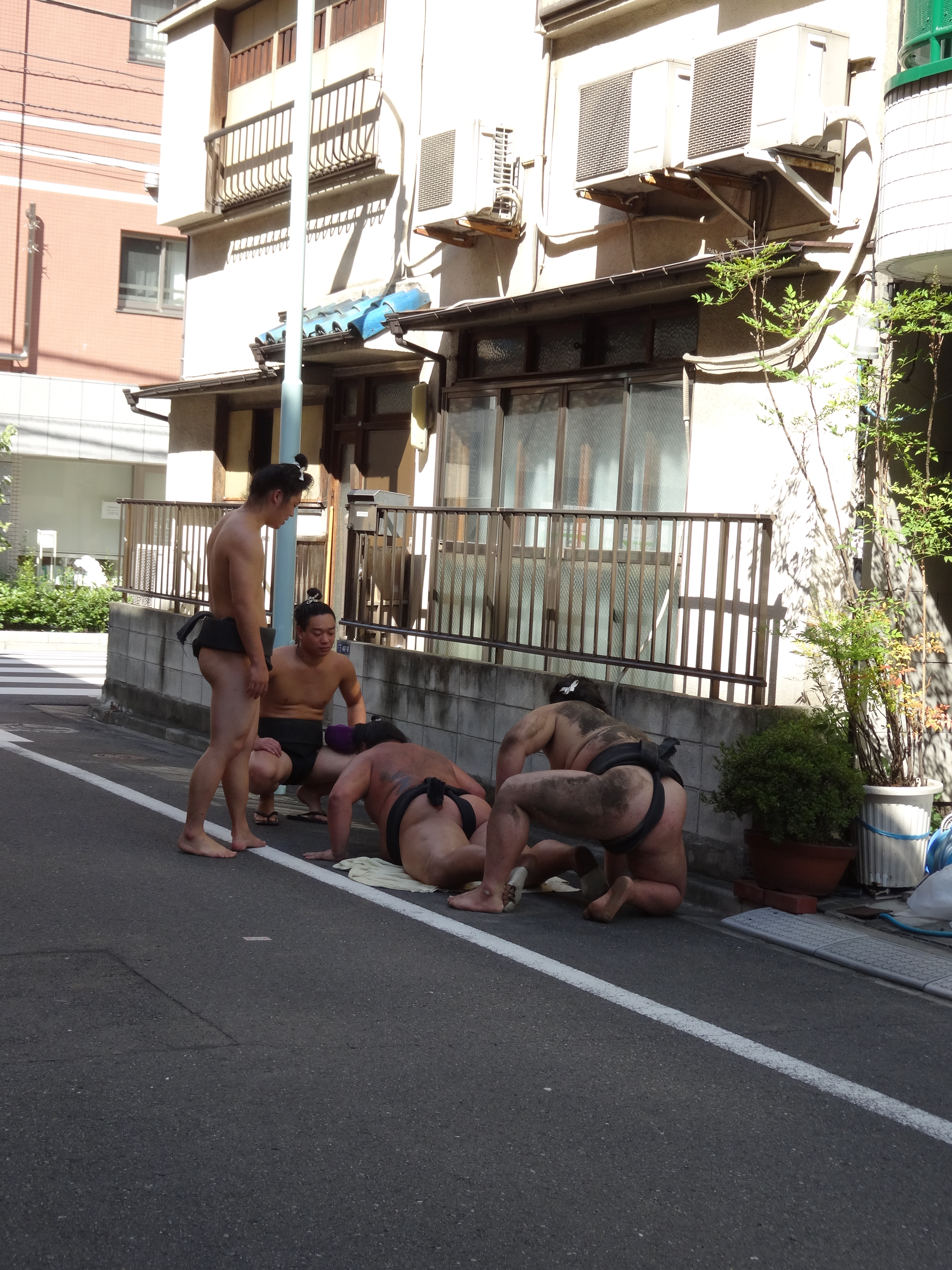
Wrestlers training outside the stable in 2014

- Tokyo, Chuo Ward, Nihonbashi Hamacho 2-47-2

3 minute walk from Hamachō Station on Toei Shinjuku Line

== See also ==
- Glossary of sumo terms
- List of sumo stables
- List of active sumo wrestlers
- List of past sumo wrestlers
