= Ōyutaka Masachika =

Japanese sumo wrestler

Personal information
- Native name: 大豊 昌央
- Born: Eiji Suzuki; 29 March 1955 (age 71) Horinouchi, Niigata, Japan
- Height: 1.85 m (6 ft 1 in)
- Weight: 156 kg (344 lb)

Sport
- Sport: Sumo
- Retired: January, 1987
- Heya: Tokitsukaze
- Record: 382-345-42
- Debut: November, 1973
- Highest rank: Komusubi (January, 1983)
- Elder name: Arashio
- Championships: 1 (Jūryō); 1 (Sandanme); 1 (Jonidan)
- Updated on August 2012

Ōyutaka Masachika (born 29 March 1955 as Eiji Suzuki) is a former sumo wrestler from Horinouchi, Niigata, Japan. He made his professional debut in November 1973, and reached the top division in May 1982. His highest rank was komusubi. He retired in January 1987, and became an elder in the Japan Sumo Association under the name Arashio. He opened Arashio stable in 2002. His son fought for the stable under the shikona Chikarayama, retiring in January 2017. Arashio-oyakata reached the mandatory retirement age of 65 in March 2020, and was replaced as head coach of the stable by his most successful wrestler, maegashira Sōkokurai. Sōkokurai had been expelled from sumo in 2011 for alleged match-fixing, but Arashio always stood by his wrestler, and Sōkokurai was re-admitted to sumo in 2013 after winning a court case.

== Career record ==
Ōyutaka Masachika
Year	January Hatsu basho, Tokyo	March Haru basho, Osaka	May Natsu basho, Tokyo	July Nagoya basho, Nagoya	September Aki basho, Tokyo	November Kyūshū basho, Fukuoka
1973	x	x	x	x	x	(Maezumo)
1974	West Jonokuchi #8; 6–1	West Jonidan #53; 3–4	East Jonidan #69; 6–1	West Jonidan #12; 3–4	East Jonidan #25; 6–1	West Sandanme #60; 5–2
1975	West Sandanme #32; 4–3	East Sandanme #18; 3–4	East Sandanme #31; 4–3	East Sandanme #19; 4–3	East Sandanme #6; 3–4	East Sandanme #17; 1–6
1976	East Sandanme #48; 5–2	West Sandanme #17; 5–2	East Makushita #51; 3–4	West Sandanme #1; 5–2	West Makushita #35; 0–1–6	West Sandanme #10; 2–5
1977	West Sandanme #33; 3–4	East Sandanme #47; Sat out due to injury 0–0–7	West Jonidan #2; 7–0–P; Champion	West Sandanme #10; 3–4	West Sandanme #25; 3–3–1	East Sandanme #38; 6–1
1978	West Makushita #54; 6–1–P	East Makushita #22; 4–3	East Makushita #17; 2–5	West Makushita #37; 5–2	West Makushita #22; 3–4	West Makushita #31; 6–1
1979	West Makushita #11; 4–3	East Makushita #7; Sat out due to injury 0–0–7	East Makushita #37; 3–4	East Makushita #46; 4–3	East Makushita #35; 4–3	East Makushita #28; 4–3
1980	East Makushita #20; 3–4	West Makushita #28; 5–2	East Makushita #15; 5–2	East Makushita #7; 4–3	East Makushita #4; 4–3	West Makushita #1; 4–3
1981	East Jūryō #13; 8–7	West Jūryō #9; 8–7	East Jūryō #6; 8–7	East Jūryō #2; 3–12	West Jūryō #12; 10–5	West Jūryō #6; 10–5
1982	East Jūryō #1; 6–9	East Jūryō #5; 12–3; Champion	West Maegashira #12; 3–12	East Jūryō #5; 10–5	West Maegashira #13; 8–7	East Maegashira #9; 11–4
1983	West Komusubi #1; 5–10	West Maegashira #3; 5–10	East Maegashira #7; 6–9	East Maegashira #10; 9–6	West Maegashira #3; 5–10	West Maegashira #8; 8–7
1984	East Maegashira #5; 7–8	East Maegashira #7; 7–8	West Maegashira #7; 5–10	West Maegashira #13; 6–9	East Jūryō #3; 8–7	East Jūryō #2; 6–9
1985	East Jūryō #8; 6–9	East Jūryō #11; 9–6	West Jūryō #6; 3–12	West Makushita #4; Sat out due to injury 0–0–7	West Makushita #44; Sat out due to injury 0–0–7	West Sandanme #24; 7–0; Champion
1986	West Makushita #28; 6–1	East Makushita #10; 5–2	West Makushita #3; 2–5	West Makushita #16; 2–5	West Makushita #36; 4–3	West Makushita #26; 4–3
1987	East Makushita #21; Retired; 0–0–7	x	x	x	x	x
Record given as wins–losses–absences Top division champion Top division runner-up Retired Lower divisions Non-participation Sanshō key: F=Fighting spirit; O=Outstanding performance; T=Technique Also shown: ★=Kinboshi; P=Playoff(s); Divisions: Makuuchi — Jūryō — Makushita — Sandanme — Jonidan — Jonokuchi Makuuchi ranks: Yokozuna — Ōzeki — Sekiwake — Komusubi — Maegashira

== See also ==
- Glossary of sumo terms
- List of past sumo wrestlers
- List of sumo elders
- List of sumo tournament second division champions
- List of komusubi
