= Satonofuji Hisashi =

Japanese professional sumo wrestler

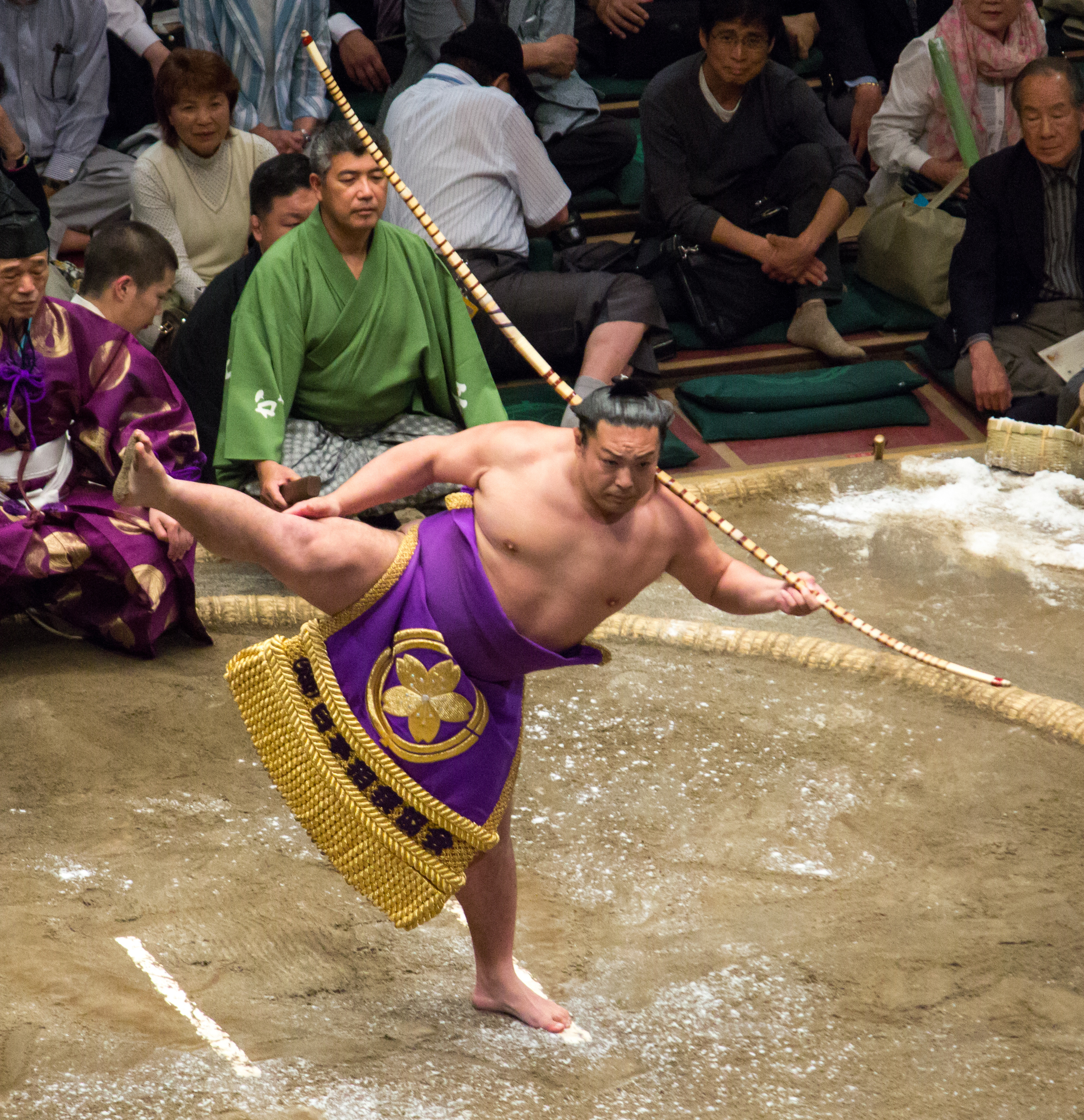
- Satonofuji performing the yumitori-shiki in May 2014

Personal information
- Native name: 聡ノ富士 久志
- Born: Hisashi Matsuoka; 15 April 1977 (age 49) Yoshioka, Gunma, Japan
- Height: 1.71 m (5 ft 7 1/2 in)
- Weight: 103.9 kg (229 lb)

Sport
- Sport: Sumo
- Retired: May 2025
- Heya: Isegahama
- Record: 570-626-21
- Debut: January 1996
- Highest rank: Makushita 55
- Updated on 24 May 2025

Satonofuji Hisashi (Japanese: 聡ノ富士 久志; born 15 April 1977 as Hisashi Matsuoka (松岡 久志, Matsuoka Hisashi)) is a Japanese former professional sumo wrestler from Gunma Prefecture. He made his debut in 1996 at the age of eighteen. His highest rank was makushita 55. He wrestled for Isegahama stable, where he was its oldest member and responsible for preparing the meals at the time of his retirement.

Satonofuji is noted for having performed the yumitori-shiki (bow-twirling ceremony) 653 times, more than any other wrestler in sumo history. He is the oldest sumo wrestler to perform the ceremony since the Shōwa era. After the conclusion of the Nagoya 2024 tournament he surpassed Edonohana, who had performed the ceremony 637 times.

== Career ==
Born in the town of Yoshioka, Gunma, Satonofuji debuted in January 1996 under the ring name Asatofuji (安聡富士). He was promoted to the third-highest makushita division in September 2005, but was relegated in the following tournament. Since then, he has never been promoted higher than sandanme. In March 2008 he changed his ring name to Satonofuji.

Satonofuji began to perform the yumitori-shiki in January 2013, which is presented following the final top division match of every Grand Sumo Tournament day and typically performed by a lower-division wrestler in the same stable as a yokozuna. At that time, stablemate Harumafuji–seven years his junior–had recently been promoted to the top rank. Satonofuji stopped performing the ceremony a few tournaments after Harumafuji retired, but resumed in September 2021. Although his return coincided with the promotion of fellow Isegahama wrestler Terunofuji to the yokozuna rank, Satonofuji had stepped in with little notice after another lower-division wrestler scheduled to perform the ceremony, Shōhōryū, injured his shoulder in a match against Ōshōumi. Upon his return to the role, Satonofuji was quoted as saying that he was too old to show his body. At the age of 44, he became the oldest performer of the ceremony since the Shōwa era.

In a November 2022 interview, Satonofuji said in regard to the yumitori-shiki that "every single gesture has a meaning, so I put my heart into it."

During the July 2023 tournament Satonofuji withdrew from competition, and so the yumitori-shiki duties temporarily went to then-sandanme wrestler Yuki from the same stable as ōzeki Kirishima. In September 2023 Satonofuji, demoted to jonokuchi for the first time since his debut in 1996, performed the yumitori-shiki for the first two days of the tournament until Yuki resumed the duties. In 2024 Satonofuji returned to yumitori duties, usually performing the ceremony unless Terunofuji withdrew from a tournament.

Satonofuji last performed the yumitori-shiki on 16 January 2025, the day that Terunofuji withdrew from the January 2025 tournament; the yokozuna officially retired the next day. Satonofuji told reporters he had sensed on the day of Terunofuji's withdrawal that he could be performing his last yumitori-shiki (since his stable would no longer have a top-ranked wrestler). Upon learning of the retirement, Satonofuji praised Terunofuji for his hard work, noting that he, like Terunofuji, also dropped down to the jonidan division before rising up again. He also reflected on his time as the performer of the yumitori-shiki, expressing his thanks for being able to set a record for the performances by being an example for other wrestlers, injured wrestlers, his stable and the Japan Sumo Association.

Following his last match at the May 2025 tournament at the rank of jonidan 100, Satonofuji announced his retirement from professional sumo, concluding a career spanning nearly three decades. The retirement coincided with the final tournament for his stablemaster Isegahama (the 63rd yokozuna Asahifuji), who reached sumo's mandatory retirement age in July 2025. Satonofuji said that he had considered retiring on two occasions following surgery for retinal detachment, but continued on because of his love for sumo. He plans to work in the food and beverage industry in Tokyo after his retirement.

== Career record ==
Satonofuji Hisashi
Year	January Hatsu basho, Tokyo	March Haru basho, Osaka	May Natsu basho, Tokyo	July Nagoya basho, Nagoya	September Aki basho, Tokyo	November Kyūshū basho, Fukuoka
1996	(Maezumo)	East Jonokuchi #50; 5–2	West Jonidan #159; 3–4	East Jonidan #178; 6–1	East Jonidan #82; 2–5	East Jonidan #114; 5–2
1997	East Jonidan #67; 4–3	East Jonidan #44; 4–3	East Jonidan #21; 4–3	West Jonidan #1; 4–3	East Sandanme #82; 3–4	West Sandanme #99; 0–7
1998	East Jonidan #44; 4–3	West Jonidan #17; 4–3	East Sandanme #99; 4–3	West Sandanme #76; 1–1–5	West Jonidan #9; 3–4	East Jonidan #20; 3–4
1999	West Jonidan #39; 4–3	West Jonidan #18; 2–5	West Jonidan #47; 5–2	East Jonidan #8; 5–2	East Sandanme #74; 1–4–2	West Jonidan #1; 4–3
2000	West Sandanme #83; 4–3	West Sandanme #66; 2–5	East Sandanme #92; 5–2	West Sandanme #56; 5–2	East Sandanme #30; 4–3	East Sandanme #15; 3–4
2001	West Sandanme #27; 1–6	West Sandanme #58; 3–4	West Sandanme #71; 5–2	West Sandanme #37; 3–4	East Sandanme #54; 4–3	West Sandanme #43; 2–5
2002	East Sandanme #68; 4–3	East Sandanme #54; 4–3	West Sandanme #38; 2–5	East Sandanme #61; 4–3	East Sandanme #46; 2–5	West Sandanme #69; 0–2–5
2003	West Jonidan #14; 5–2	East Sandanme #80; 3–4	West Jonidan #1; 2–5	East Jonidan #32; 6–1	West Sandanme #68; 3–4	West Sandanme #84; 3–4
2004	West Sandanme #98; 4–3	East Sandanme #80; 4–3	East Sandanme #64; 4–3	West Sandanme #47; 3–4	East Sandanme #65; 2–5	East Sandanme #86; 4–3
2005	West Sandanme #67; 5–2	West Sandanme #39; 4–3	East Sandanme #27; 3–4	East Sandanme #40; 6–1	East Makushita #55; 1–6	West Sandanme #26; 2–5
2006	East Sandanme #52; 4–3	West Sandanme #37; 4–3	West Sandanme #23; 2–5	West Sandanme #48; 4–3	West Sandanme #32; 3–4	West Sandanme #45; 3–4
2007	West Sandanme #60; 3–4	East Sandanme #77; 3–4	West Sandanme #94; 3–4	West Jonidan #3; 5–2	West Sandanme #72; 4–3	West Sandanme #51; 2–5
2008	East Sandanme #73; 4–3	West Sandanme #52; 3–4	East Sandanme #66; 3–4	East Sandanme #80; 4–3	East Sandanme #61; 3–4	East Sandanme #73; 4–3
2009	East Sandanme #55; 2–5	East Sandanme #81; 3–4	West Sandanme #97; 4–3	West Sandanme #77; 4–3	West Sandanme #61; 3–4	West Sandanme #74; 4–3
2010	East Sandanme #59; Sat out due to injury 0–0–7	West Jonidan #19; 6–1	East Sandanme #57; 3–4	West Sandanme #72; 4–3	West Sandanme #53; 5–2	East Sandanme #26; 2–5
2011	West Sandanme #54; 2–5	West Sandanme #81; Tournament Cancelled; Match fixing investigation 0–0–0	West Sandanme #81; 4–3	East Sandanme #53; 2–5	East Sandanme #78; 3–4	East Sandanme #95; 3–4
2012	West Jonidan #15; 2–5	East Jonidan #50; 3–4	West Jonidan #73; 7–0–P	East Sandanme #73; 4–3	East Sandanme #56; 4–3	West Sandanme #40; 3–4
2013	West Sandanme #55; 2–5	West Sandanme #73; 2–5	East Jonidan #7; 3–4	East Jonidan #27; 4–3	West Jonidan #8; 5–2	East Sandanme #77; 3–4
2014	East Sandanme #92; 3–4	East Jonidan #4; 3–4	East Jonidan #27; 3–4	West Jonidan #49; 4–3	West Jonidan #25; 4–3	East Jonidan #4; 3–4
2015	East Jonidan #26; 3–4	West Jonidan #44; 5–2	West Jonidan #8; 4–3	West Sandanme #88; 3–4	West Jonidan #13; 5–2	East Sandanme #78; 2–5
2016	East Jonidan #5; 4–3	East Sandanme #85; 3–4	West Jonidan #4; 3–4	West Jonidan #25; 5–2	West Sandanme #88; 3–4	West Jonidan #5; 3–4
2017	West Jonidan #26; 4–3	East Jonidan #3; 4–3	East Sandanme #83; 2–5	West Jonidan #16; 3–4	East Jonidan #53; 4–3	West Jonidan #25; 4–3
2018	East Jonidan #3; 2–5	East Jonidan #25; 3–4	East Jonidan #50; 3–4	West Jonidan #73; 3–4	East Jonidan #100; 5–2	West Jonidan #54; 3–4
2019	East Jonidan #77; 5–2	East Jonidan #31; 2–5	West Jonidan #66; 4–3	East Jonidan #37; 2–5	West Jonidan #79; 2–5	West Jonidan #44; 2–5
2020	East Jonidan #87; 5–2	West Jonidan #39; 2–5	West Jonidan #82; Tournament Cancelled; State of Emergency; 0–0–0	West Jonidan #82; 3–4	East Jonidan #92; 5–2	West Jonidan #45; 2–5
2021	West Jonidan #86; 5–2	East Jonidan #39; 2–5	West Jonidan #70; 3–4	East Jonidan #78; 4–3	East Jonidan #45; 2–5	West Jonidan #77; 4–3
2022	West Jonidan #43; 2–5	East Jonidan #71; 3–4	West Jonidan #91; 4–3	West Jonidan #56; 3–4	East Jonidan #78; 3–4	East Jonidan #89; 3–4
2023	West Jonidan #91; 4–3	West Jonidan #57; 2–5	East Jonidan #85; 2–5	East Jonidan #102; 1–4–2	East Jonokuchi #8; 4–3	West Jonidan #76; 2–5
2024	East Jonidan #93; 2–5	West Jonidan #91; 2–5	East Jonidan #93; 3–4	West Jonidan #95; 1–6	East Jonidan #98; 2–5	East Jonokuchi #4; 4–3
2025	East Jonidan #72; 2–5	West Jonidan #89; 2–5	West Jonidan #100; Retired; 2–5	x	x	x
Record given as wins–losses–absences Top division champion Top division runner-up Retired Lower divisions Non-participation Sanshō key: F=Fighting spirit; O=Outstanding performance; T=Technique Also shown: ★=Kinboshi; P=Playoff(s); Divisions: Makuuchi — Jūryō — Makushita — Sandanme — Jonidan — Jonokuchi Makuuchi ranks: Yokozuna — Ōzeki — Sekiwake — Komusubi — Maegashira

== See also ==
- List of past sumo wrestlers
- Glossary of sumo terms
