= Asahifuji Seiya =

Japanese sumo wrestler

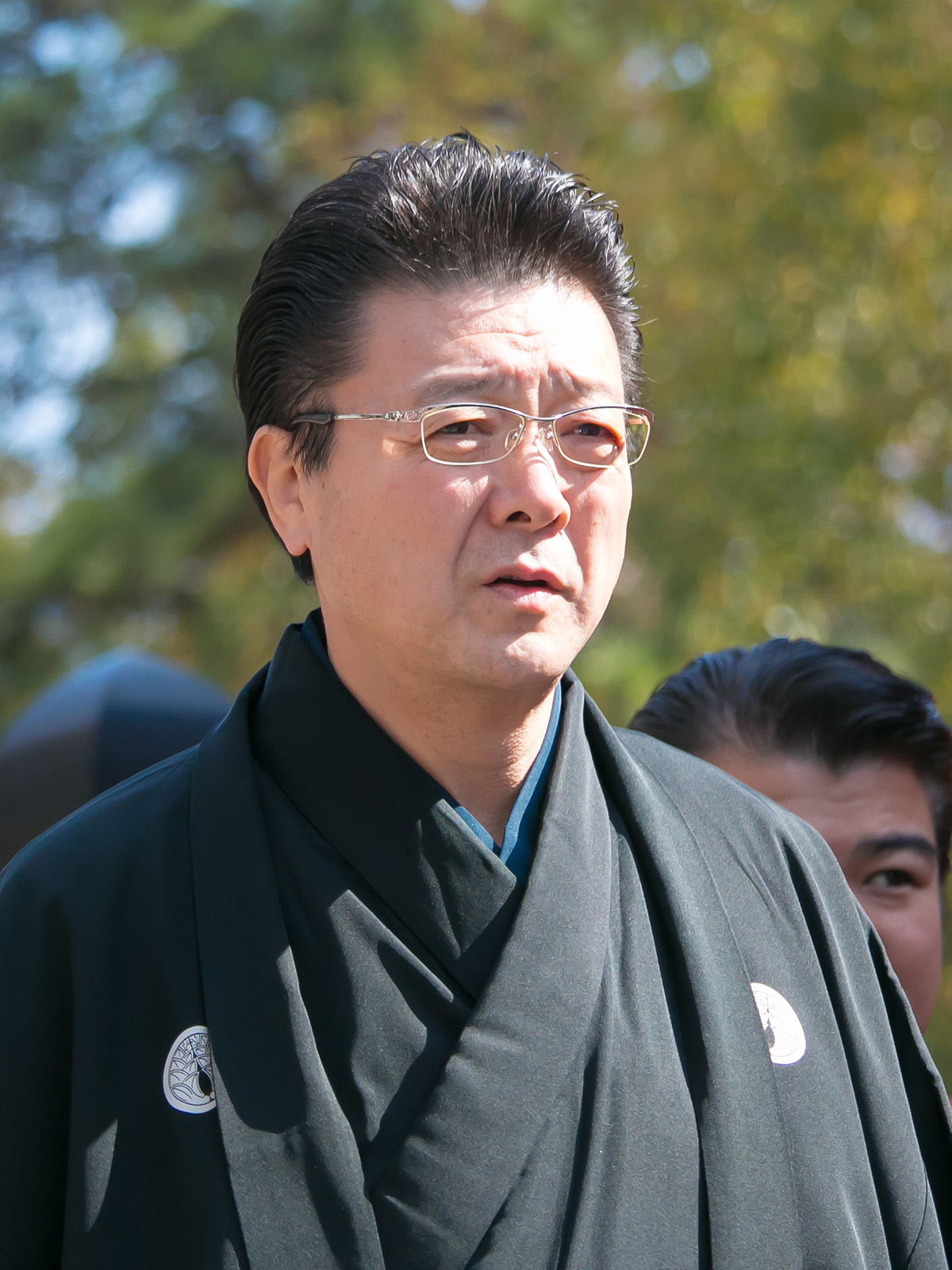
- Asahifuji at Sumiyoshi-taisha, March 2017

Personal information
- Native name: 旭富士 正也
- Born: Seiya Suginomori; July 6, 1960 (age 66) Tsugaru, Aomori, Japan
- Height: 1.89 m (6 ft 2 in)
- Weight: 148 kg (326 lb)

Sport
- Sport: Sumo
- Retired: January, 1992
- Heya: Ōshima
- Record: 573–323–46
- Debut: January, 1981
- Highest rank: Yokozuna (July, 1990)
- Elder name: Ajigawa → Isegahama → Miyagino
- Championships: 4 (Makuuchi); 1 (Makushita); 1 (Sandanme); 1 (Jonokuchi)
- Special Prizes: Outstanding Performance (2); Fighting Spirit (2); Technique (5)
- Gold Stars: 2 (Kitanoumi, Futahaguro)
- Updated on August 2007

Asahifuji Seiya (旭富士 正也; born Seiya Suginomori (杉野森 正也) on July 6, 1960) is a Japanese former professional sumo wrestler from Aomori. He joined professional sumo in 1981, reaching the top makuuchi division just two years later. He reached the second highest rank of ōzeki in 1987 and became the 63rd yokozuna in the history of the sport in 1990 at the age of 30. He won four tournaments and was a runner-up on nine other occasions. He retired in 1992 and was the stablemaster of Isegahama stable from 1993 until 2025. As a coach he has produced two yokozuna, Harumafuji and Terunofuji.

== Early life ==
He was born in the fishing town of Kizukuri in Nishitsugaru District. His father, who worked as an electrician, was a keen amateur sumo enthusiast and Vice President of the Prefectural Sumo Federation. He was determined to see his son succeed in sumo and even built a dohyō in the garden for him to practice. Asahifuji also did well at sumo at school, finishing third in a national schoolboy competition, and later winning the West Japan Student Newcomers tournament while studying at Kinki University. However, tiring of the never-ending training, he gave up sumo for a while and spent his time fishing. Eventually an acquaintance of his father introduced him to Ōshima-oyakata, former ōzeki Asahikuni, who had recently opened his own heya or stable of wrestlers, Ōshima stable.

== Early sumo career ==
Asahifuji made his professional debut in January 1981. He was already 20 years old, considerably older than most new recruits who tended to be 15 or 16 at the time. However, because of his amateur sumo experience he was able to work his way up the ranks very quickly and won tournament championships in the jonokuchi, sandanme and makushita divisions with perfect records. He reached the second highest jūryō division after only eight tournaments, a record that stood unbeaten until 2008. He was promoted to the top makuuchi division in March 1983. He won his first special prize for Fighting Spirit in the November 1984 tournament, where he finished runner-up. He reached sekiwake rank for the first time in January 1986. After regular training sessions at Takasago stable, where he knew Asashio from his university days, he began to develop a more rounded technique, and after three double figure records he was promoted to sumo's second highest rank of ōzeki after the September 1987 tournament.

== Ōzeki ==
In January 1988 Asahifuji won his first top division tournament championship, which was also the first for the Tatsunami-Isegahama icihimon or group of stables in nearly twenty years. In 1989 he won 40 out of a possible 45 bouts in the first three championships of the year and came very close to promotion to the highest rank of yokozuna, but he was defeated by yokozuna Hokutoumi in playoffs in both January and May 1989. His 13–2 record in May was his fifth consecutive runner-up performance, and his seventh overall, but he had been unable to win two tournaments in a row, regarded by the Japan Sumo Association as the minimum requirement for yokozuna promotion after the embarrassment of Futahaguro's brief tenure at sumo top's rank.

After managing only 8–7 in the following tournament in July, Asahifuji endured a long slump. This was partly caused by longstanding pancreatic trouble, which had first been diagnosed in 1984 and had also afflicted his stablemaster during his active days. After a string of mediocre 8–7 and 9–6 scores it seemed Asahifuji would finish his career as an ōzeki. However, by mid-1990 his health began to improve, and after encouragement from his stablemaster, who reminded him that he would soon turn 30 years of age and was down to his last chance, he won consecutive championships in May and July 1990. He scored 14–1 in both tournaments, securing his yokozuna promotion on the final day in July by defeating yokozuna Chiyonofuji for only the fifth time in 28 meetings.

== Yokozuna ==
Asahifuji began his yokozuna career with 12 straight wins in the September 1990 tournament, but he lost to Kirishima on Day 13 and was defeated by Hokutoumi in the championship deciding bout on the final day. In November 1990 he finished runner-up again, to Chiyonofuji. In January and March 1991 he posted reasonable scores of 11–4 but was never really in contention for the championship in either tournament, although he did have a memorable win over the young rising star Takahanada in March. He had to wait until May 1991 for his first title as a yokozuna, when he defeated Konishiki twice on the last day, once in their regulation match and once in the playoff, to finish with a 14–1 record.

This was to prove Asahifuji's only tournament championship as a yokozuna, as the rest of his career was dogged by illness and injury. He managed only a bare majority of 8–7 in July 1991, the last tournament he was to complete. He pulled out of the September 1991 tournament with an injured shoulder on the sixth day, and hampered by the return of his old pancreatic problems missed the November 1991 tournament altogether. He returned in January 1992 but after losing his opening three bouts to Akebono, his nemesis Akinoshima (for the fifth time in a row) and finally Wakahanada, he announced his retirement at the age of 31. Asahifuji's three bout losing streak from the opening day was equal to the worst ever for a yokozuna in the 15-day era until Kisenosato lost his first four bouts in November 2018. He gave the worsening condition of his pancreas as the reason for his retirement. His danpatsu-shiki or retirement ceremony was held in September 1992. There were no active yokozuna at the time, so he was unable to follow the tradition of having one serve as his tachimochi and tsuyuharai for the event.

== After retirement ==
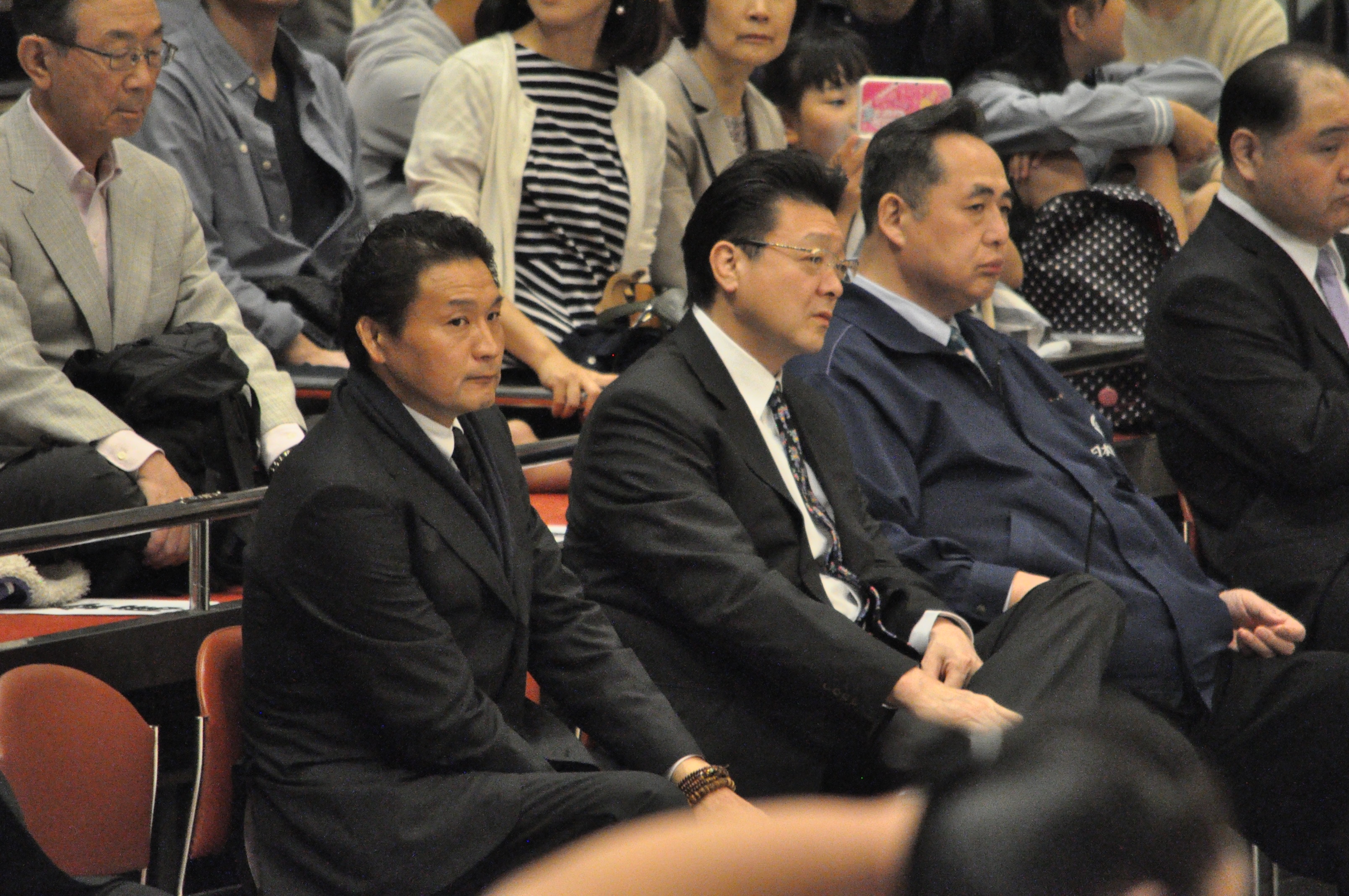
Asahifuji (middle, with glasses) watching a Yokozuna Deliberation Council training session, May 2017

=== Coaching career ===
Asahifuji has remained in the sumo world as a coach. He had married a niece of the former Kasugayama (former maegashira Ōnobori) in 1988, and seemed set to revive Kasugayama stable, but instead he took over Ajigawa stable in 1993 due to the poor health of the previous incumbent (former sekiwake Mutsuarashi). In November 2007 Asahifuji acquired the Isegahama elder name and renamed his stable "Isegahama stable."

Both as Ajigawa and Isegahama, he had a prolific career, elevating several wrestlers to the top ranks of the sport. The first top division wrestler he produced was Aminishiki in 2000, who reached the sekiwake rank in 2007. Aminishiki's brother Asōfuji, who retired in 2011 after a match-fixing scandal, was also briefly a top division wrestler. One of Asahifuji's greatest success as a trainer came first with Harumafuji, who he recruited in 2001 and who initially fought under the shikona of Ama. Harumafuji reached the second highest rank of ōzeki in November 2008 and won his first top division championship in May 2009. Harumafuji took his second championship in July 2011, the same tournament in which Takarafuji, like Asahifuji a Kindai University graduate, made his top division debut. Homarefuji reached jūryō in 2012, and in September of that year Harumafuji was promoted to yokozuna following two consecutive 15–0 championships. Isegahama had motivated Harumafuji by telling him before his July 2011 championship, "If you are content with being ozeki then it is all over. You do not become a yokozuna just by wanting to be a yokozuna." Like Asahifuji, Harumafuji performed the yokozuna ring entering ceremony or dohyō-iri in the Shiranui style. He has continued to produce top wrestlers, with Takarafuji reaching komusubi rank and Terunofuji, inherited from the defunct Magaki stable, being promoted to ōzeki, both in 2015. Terunofuji fell to the jonidan division through injury in 2019. Isegahama refused to accept Terunofuji's request to be allowed to retire, and his faith was rewarded when Terunofuji staged a spectacular comeback and reached the yokozuna rank in July 2021.

In the final years of his coaching career, he continued to nurture promising young wrestlers, with Midorifuji winning promotion to makuuchi in 2021, while Atamifuji and Nishikifuji advanced to that division in 2022. In 2024, another pupil of Asahifuji, Takerufuji, made his makuuchi debut and became the first wrestler in 110 years to win the championship in his inaugural top division tournament.

He has also worked as a judge at tournament matches. In April 2025, Asahifuji was awarded the Order of the Polar Star, the highest Mongolian distinction that can be bestowed on a foreigner, for his success in training Mongolian sumo wrestlers.

Asahifuji turned 60 in July 2020. His kanreki dohyō-iri, originally postponed from May 2020 due to the COVID-19 pandemic, was held at Ryōgoku Kokugikan on 3 October 2021. Two of Isegahama stable's retired wrestlers, Ajigawa (former sekiwake Aminishiki) and yokozuna Harumafuji, served as his tsuyuharai and tachimochi, respectively. He told reporters shortly after the original postponement that he would need to put on weight to be able to wear his tsuna.

In April 2024, as head of his ichimon, he took on the responsibility of hosting Miyagino stable following the Hokuseihō violence scandal and the subsequent closure of the stable. The merger of the two stables made Isegahama stable the largest active stable in the sport.

Following the resignation and final retirement of former stablemaster Miyagino (the 69th yokozuna Hakuhō) in June 2025, Isegahama was announced as the successor to the Miyagino elder stock after the departure of the former Hakuhō, and would hand over his stable to his pupil Terunofuji. According to the press conference, this choice was explained by Miyagino's desire to see his former apprentices supervised, as they should now belong permanently to the Isegahama stable.

On 9 June 2025 Asahifuji formally took over the Miyagino kabu. At Hakuhō's press conference that same day, the new Miyagino Seiya told reporters that if there was a former Miyagino wrestler who can next take on the Miyagino name, he would do his best to help him revive the Miyagino stable. He remains affiliated with Isegahama stable as a coach, and began his re-employment with the Sumo Association as a san'yo (consultant) upon reaching his 65th birthday on 6 July 2025.

On 10 November 2025, it was announced that the promising recruit to his stable, Mongolian Battsetsegye Ochirsaihan, would inherit his shikona "Asahifuji". This decision was considered unusual, as wrestlers generally receive the names of previous yokozuna after they themselves have gained experience. Ochirsaihan, who has been dubbed "the strongest trainee in history", made his professional debut that same month, defeating fellow Mongolian Tenshoyama.

=== Scandals and board resignations ===
Asahifuji submitted Harumafuji's retirement papers to the Sumo Association on 29 November 2017 after the yokozuna took responsibility for an assault on fellow Mongolian Takanoiwa in a Tottori restaurant and bar the previous month. At a subsequent news conference Isegahama shed tears as he told reporters, "I've watched him grow since he was 16 and have never seen or heard of him being violent before... I can't imagine why it happened." At a meeting on 20 December 2017 the Sumo Association accepted Isegahama's resignation as a director. He was moved to the competition inspection committee as a deputy chairman. He returned to the board of directors in 2020 as head of the judging department.

On 26 December 2022 Asahifuji again submitted his resignation as a member of the Japan Sumo Association's Board of Directors after it was found that two junior wrestlers in his stable acted violently against younger wrestlers, with the victims beaten with wooden beams and burned with chankonabe hot water poured on their backs. According to the Sumo Association, Asahifuji knew about these incidents but failed to report them. When the board concluded that he should be demoted in sumo's hierarchy as punishment, he instead submitted his resignation. One of the wrestlers held responsible was suspended for two tournaments, while the other had already submitted his retirement papers, which were accepted. Asahifuji's resignation from the board resulted in him vacating his position as the head of the judging department. The following month it was confirmed through the Sumo Association's website that he had been demoted two ranks to yakuin taigu iin (executive member) and was appointed deputy director of the guidance promotion department.

== Fighting style ==
Asahifuji's favoured kimarite or techniques were listed by the Sumo Association as migi-yotsu (a left hand outside, right hand inside grip on the opponent's mawashi), yorikiri (force out) and uwatedashinage (pulling overarm throw). However, he was also fond of employing more unorthodox techniques little used by other wrestlers and certainly not taught by coaches. He was criticised for this by his stablemaster, the former ōzeki and noted technician Asahikuni, whose view was that by winning by his own idiosyncratic methods, he would be unable to cure his faults. Asahifuji himself claimed in an interview with Channel 4 television to have no favourite technique, but did say that while "everyone likes to throw an opponent, that's not sumo."

== Career record ==
Asahifuji Seiya
Year	January Hatsu basho, Tokyo	March Haru basho, Osaka	May Natsu basho, Tokyo	July Nagoya basho, Nagoya	September Aki basho, Tokyo	November Kyūshū basho, Fukuoka
1981	(Maezumō)	West Jonokuchi #27; 7–0; Champion	East Jonidan #44; 6–1	West Sandanme #77; 7–0–P; Champion	East Makushita #60; 4–3	West Makushita #47; 7–0; Champion
1982	East Makushita #2; 5–2	West Jūryō #10; 9–6	West Jūryō #6; 6–9	West Jūryō #8; 9–6	East Jūryō #4; 7–8	West Jūryō #6; 9–6
1983	East Jūryō #1; 10–5	West Maegashira #10; 8–7	East Maegashira #4; 4–11	East Maegashira #11; 9–6	West Maegashira #5; 8–7	West Komusubi #1; 6–9
1984	East Maegashira #4; 1–3–11	East Maegashira #14; 9–6	East Maegashira #6; 8–7	West Maegashira #2; 8–7 ★	West Komusubi #1; 5–10	East Maegashira #5; 11–4; F
1985	East Komusubi #1; 7–8	East Maegashira #1; 9–6; T	East Komusubi #1; 8–7	East Komusubi #1; 5–10	East Maegashira #2; 10–5; T	East Komusubi #1; 8–7
1986	West Sekiwake #1; 11–4; O	East Sekiwake #1; 7–8	West Komusubi #1; 11–4; O	East Sekiwake #1; 4–11	East Maegashira #2; 8–7 ★	West Komusubi #1; 7–8
1987	East Maegashira #1; 8–7	West Sekiwake #1; 10–5	West Sekiwake #1; 10–5; T	East Sekiwake #1; 11–4; T	East Sekiwake #1; 12–3; TF	West Ōzeki #1; 11–4
1988	East Ōzeki #1; 14–1	East Ōzeki #1; 12–3	East Ōzeki #1; 12–3	East Ōzeki #1; 11–4	East Ōzeki #1; 12–3	East Ōzeki #1; 12–3
1989	East Ōzeki #1; 14–1–P	East Ōzeki #1; 13–2	East Ōzeki #1; 13–2–P	East Ōzeki #1; 8–7	West Ōzeki #1; 9–6	West Ōzeki #1; 8–7
1990	West Ōzeki #1; 9–6	West Ōzeki #2; 8–7	West Ōzeki #2; 14–1	East Ōzeki #1; 14–1	West Yokozuna #1; 13–2	West Yokozuna #1; 12–3
1991	West Yokozuna #1; 11–4	West Yokozuna #1; 11–4	East Yokozuna #2; 14–1–P	East Yokozuna #1; 8–7	West Yokozuna #1; 2–4–9	East Yokozuna #1; Sat out due to injury 0–0–15
1992	West Yokozuna #1; Retired; 0–4	x	x	x	x	x
Record given as wins–losses–absences Top division champion Top division runner-up Retired Non-participation Jūryō Lower divisions Sanshō key: F=Fighting spirit; O=Outstanding performance; T=Technique Also shown: ★=Kinboshi; P=Playoff(s); Divisions: Makuuchi — Jūryō — Makushita — Sandanme — Jonidan — Jonokuchi Makuuchi ranks: Yokozuna — Ōzeki — Sekiwake — Komusubi — Maegashira

== See also ==
- Glossary of sumo terms
- List of past sumo wrestlers
- List of sumo elders
- List of sumo tournament top division champions
- List of sumo tournament top division runners-up
- List of yokozuna

Preceded by Ōnokuni Yasushi	63rd Yokozuna; July 1990 – January 1992	Succeeded by Akebono Tarō
Yokozuna is not a successive rank, and more than one wrestler can hold the title at once
