= Takarakuni Minoru =

Japanese sumo wrestler

Personal information
- Native name: 斉須 稔
- Born: Minoru Saisu; 16 August 1956 (age 70) Higashi, Fukushima, Japan
- Height: 1.88 m (6 ft 2 in)
- Weight: 129 kg (284 lb)

Sport
- Sport: Sumo
- Retired: September, 1986
- Heya: Isegahama → Kiriyama
- Record: 464-455-0
- Debut: July, 1971
- Highest rank: Maegashira 2 (November, 1983)
- Championships: 1 (Jūryō); 1 (Makushita); 1 (Sandanme); 1 (Jonidan)
- Updated on Sep. 2012

Takarakuni Minoru (born 16 August 1956 as Minoru Saisu) is a former sumo wrestler from Higashi, Fukushima, Japan. He made his professional debut in July 1971, joining the original Isegahama stable, recruited by former yokozuna Terukuni, and reached the top division in March 1982. His highest rank was maegashira 2. Following his retirement from active competition he remained in the sumo world as a sewanin under his real name Saisu, and was a member of Asahiyama stable and then the new Isegahama stable. He reached the mandatory retirement age of 65 for sumo personnel in August 2021 and left his position.

In November 1973 he won out in an extraordinary twelve-way playoff for the Jonidan championship, winning four additional bouts for a final score of 6–1–PPPP.

== Career record ==
Takarakuni Minoru
Year	January Hatsu basho, Tokyo	March Haru basho, Osaka	May Natsu basho, Tokyo	July Nagoya basho, Nagoya	September Aki basho, Tokyo	November Kyūshū basho, Fukuoka
1971	x	x	x	(Maezumo)	East Jonokuchi #11; 4–3	West Jonidan #77; 0–4
1972	West Jonidan #100; 3–0	West Jonidan #42; 0–0	West Jonidan #42; 2–5	West Jonidan #60; 3–4	East Jonidan #72; 1–6	East Jonidan #88; 4–3
1973	West Jonidan #55; 5–2	West Jonidan #20; 2–5	East Jonidan #41; 3–4	West Jonidan #57; 4–3	West Jonidan #40; 3–4	West Jonidan #60; 6–1–PPPP; Champion
1974	East Jonidan #17; 5–2	West Sandanme #65; 3–4	East Sandanme #77; 4–3	West Sandanme #61; 4–3	West Sandanme #47; 5–2	West Sandanme #22; 4–3
1975	West Sandanme #9; 1–6	West Sandanme #36; 4–3	West Sandanme #23; 4–3	East Sandanme #14; 2–5	West Sandanme #34; 4–3	East Sandanme #24; 5–2
1976	West Sandanme #1; 4–3	East Makushita #53; 3–4	West Sandanme #5; 7–0; Champion	East Makushita #22; 2–5	West Makushita #39; 5–2	East Makushita #21; 6–1
1977	East Makushita #6; 3–4	East Makushita #12; 2–5	East Makushita #30; 3–4	West Makushita #38; 4–3	West Makushita #31; 5–2	East Makushita #17; 5–2
1978	East Makushita #10; 6–1–P	West Makushita #1; 3–4	East Makushita #4; 3–4	West Makushita #9; 5–2	East Makushita #3; 7–0; Champion	West Jūryō #9; 9–6
1979	West Jūryō #4; 6–9	East Jūryō #9; 7–8	East Jūryō #11; 7–8	West Jūryō #11; 6–9	East Makushita #4; 3–4	East Makushita #10; 6–1
1980	West Makushita #1; 5–2	West Jūryō #11; 8–7	East Jūryō #11; 7–8	East Makushita #1; 6–1	East Jūryō #13; 8–7	West Jūryō #9; 7–8
1981	East Jūryō #11; 7–8	East Makushita #1; 4–3	West Jūryō #12; 9–6	East Jūryō #6; 9–6	East Jūryō #3; 5–10	East Jūryō #10; 8–7
1982	East Jūryō #6; 11–4	East Maegashira #13; 4–11	West Jūryō #5; 11–4–P; Champion	West Maegashira #13; 9–6	East Maegashira #7; 5–10	East Maegashira #14; 8–7
1983	West Maegashira #7; 8–7	East Maegashira #3; 4–11	East Maegashira #8; 8–7	East Maegashira #3; 5–10	East Maegashira #9; 9–6	East Maegashira #2; 5–10
1984	West Maegashira #8; 6–9	East Maegashira #12; 5–10	West Jūryō #6; 6–9	East Jūryō #9; 8–7	West Jūryō #5; 6–9	West Jūryō #9; 8–7
1985	West Jūryō #8; 7–8	East Jūryō #9; 8–7	East Jūryō #8; 5–10	West Jūryō #12; 7–8	East Makushita #1; 4–3	West Jūryō #13; 5–10
1986	East Makushita #6; 4–3	East Makushita #3; 3–4	West Makushita #6; 1–6	West Makushita #32; 6–1	West Makushita #13; Retired; 3–4	x
Record given as wins–losses–absences Top division champion Top division runner-up Retired Lower divisions Non-participation Sanshō key: F=Fighting spirit; O=Outstanding performance; T=Technique Also shown: ★=Kinboshi; P=Playoff(s); Divisions: Makuuchi — Jūryō — Makushita — Sandanme — Jonidan — Jonokuchi Makuuchi ranks: Yokozuna — Ōzeki — Sekiwake — Komusubi — Maegashira

== See also ==
- Glossary of sumo terms
- List of past sumo wrestlers
- List of sumo tournament second division champions
