= Katsuhikari Toshio =

Japanese sumo wrestler (1942–2018)

Personal information
- Native name: 和晃 敏郎
- Born: Toshio Sugiura; 9 August 1942 Gamagōri, Aichi
- Died: 1 January 2018 (aged 75) Tokyo
- Height: 1.86 m (6 ft 1 in)
- Weight: 113 kg (249 lb)

Sport
- Sport: Sumo
- Retired: March, 1973
- Heya: Araiso → Isegahama
- Record: 461-426-3-1 (draw)
- Debut: November, 1958
- Highest rank: Maegashira 1 (September, 1970)
- Elder name: Wakafuji
- Championships: 1 (Jūryō)
- Updated on June 2020

Katsuhikari Toshio (born Toshio Sugiura; 9 August 1942 – 1 January 2018) was a Japanese sumo wrestler. He made his professional debut in November 1958 and reached the top division in September 1969. His highest rank was maegashira 1. Upon retirement from active competition he became an elder in the Japan Sumo Association under the name Wakafuji. He reached the Sumo Association's mandatory retirement age in August 2007. He died from cancer of the bile duct on 1 January 2018 aged 75.

== Career record ==
Katsuhikari Toshio
Year	January Hatsu basho, Tokyo	March Haru basho, Osaka	May Natsu basho, Tokyo	July Nagoya basho, Nagoya	September Aki basho, Tokyo	November Kyūshū basho, Fukuoka
1958	x	x	x	x	x	(Maezumo)
1959	East Jonokuchi #14; 6–2	West Jonidan #103; 6–2	East Jonidan #71; 6–2	West Jonidan #39; 6–2	West Jonidan #11; 6–2	West Sandanme #75; 4–4
1960	West Sandanme #75; 3–5	West Sandanme #76; 3–5	East Sandanme #90; 7–1–P	East Sandanme #38; 3–4	East Sandanme #45; 4–3	East Sandanme #34; 4–3
1961	East Sandanme #24; 6–1	East Makushita #69; 3–4	West Makushita #84; 4–3	East Makushita #75; 5–2	West Makushita #58; 2–5	East Makushita #74; 6–1
1962	West Makushita #38; 3–4	East Makushita #43; 5–2	West Makushita #28; 4–3	East Makushita #23; 4–3	East Makushita #22; 6–1	East Makushita #11; 3–4
1963	East Makushita #14; 4–3	East Makushita #12; 3–4	East Makushita #15; 5–2	West Makushita #7; 3–4	West Makushita #10; 4–3	West Makushita #8; 3–4
1964	East Makushita #12; 3–4	East Makushita #14; 5–2	West Makushita #4; 4–3	West Makushita #3; 3–4	West Makushita #5; 3–4	East Makushita #7; 3–4
1965	East Makushita #10; 6–1	East Makushita #1; 4–3	West Jūryō #17; 8–7	East Jūryō #16; 8–7	East Jūryō #15; 8–7	West Jūryō #12; 6–8–1draw
1966	East Jūryō #18; 7–8	East Makushita #2; 6–1	West Jūryō #18; 4–11	West Makushita #8; 3–4	East Makushita #11; 5–2	East Makushita #5; 2–5
1967	East Makushita #16; 6–1	East Makushita #4; 5–2	West Makushita #6; 4–3	East Makushita #4; 3–4	East Makushita #7; 3–4	West Makushita #8; 3–4
1968	West Makushita #11; 6–1	West Makushita #3; 5–2	East Jūryō #13; 9–6	East Jūryō #7; 6–9	West Jūryō #11; 9–6	West Jūryō #5; 6–9
1969	East Jūryō #8; 8–7	East Jūryō #7; 9–6	West Jūryō #1; 7–8	West Jūryō #2; 9–6	West Maegashira #10; 2–13	East Jūryō #7; 5–10
1970	East Jūryō #12; 13–2; Champion	West Jūryō #2; 11–4	West Maegashira #10; 8–7	East Maegashira #6; 9–6	East Maegashira #1; 3–12	West Maegashira #7; 2–13
1971	East Jūryō #3; 7–8	West Jūryō #5; 9–6	West Jūryō #2; 10–5	West Maegashira #12; 4–11	East Jūryō #6; 8–7	East Jūryō #3; 8–7
1972	East Jūryō #2; 9–6	East Maegashira #10; 5–10	East Jūryō #3; 5–10	East Jūryō #8; 6–9	West Jūryō #9; 10–5–P	East Jūryō #4; 3–12
1973	East Jūryō #12; 6–9	East Makushita #3; Retired; 1–3–3				
Record given as wins–losses–absences Top division champion Top division runner-up Retired Lower divisions Non-participation Sanshō key: F=Fighting spirit; O=Outstanding performance; T=Technique Also shown: ★=Kinboshi; P=Playoff(s); Divisions: Makuuchi — Jūryō — Makushita — Sandanme — Jonidan — Jonokuchi Makuuchi ranks: Yokozuna — Ōzeki — Sekiwake — Komusubi — Maegashira

== See also ==
- Glossary of sumo terms
- List of past sumo wrestlers
- List of sumo tournament second division champions
