= Isegahama stable (active) =

Stable of sumo wrestlers

Coordinates: 35.6908°N 139.8126°E

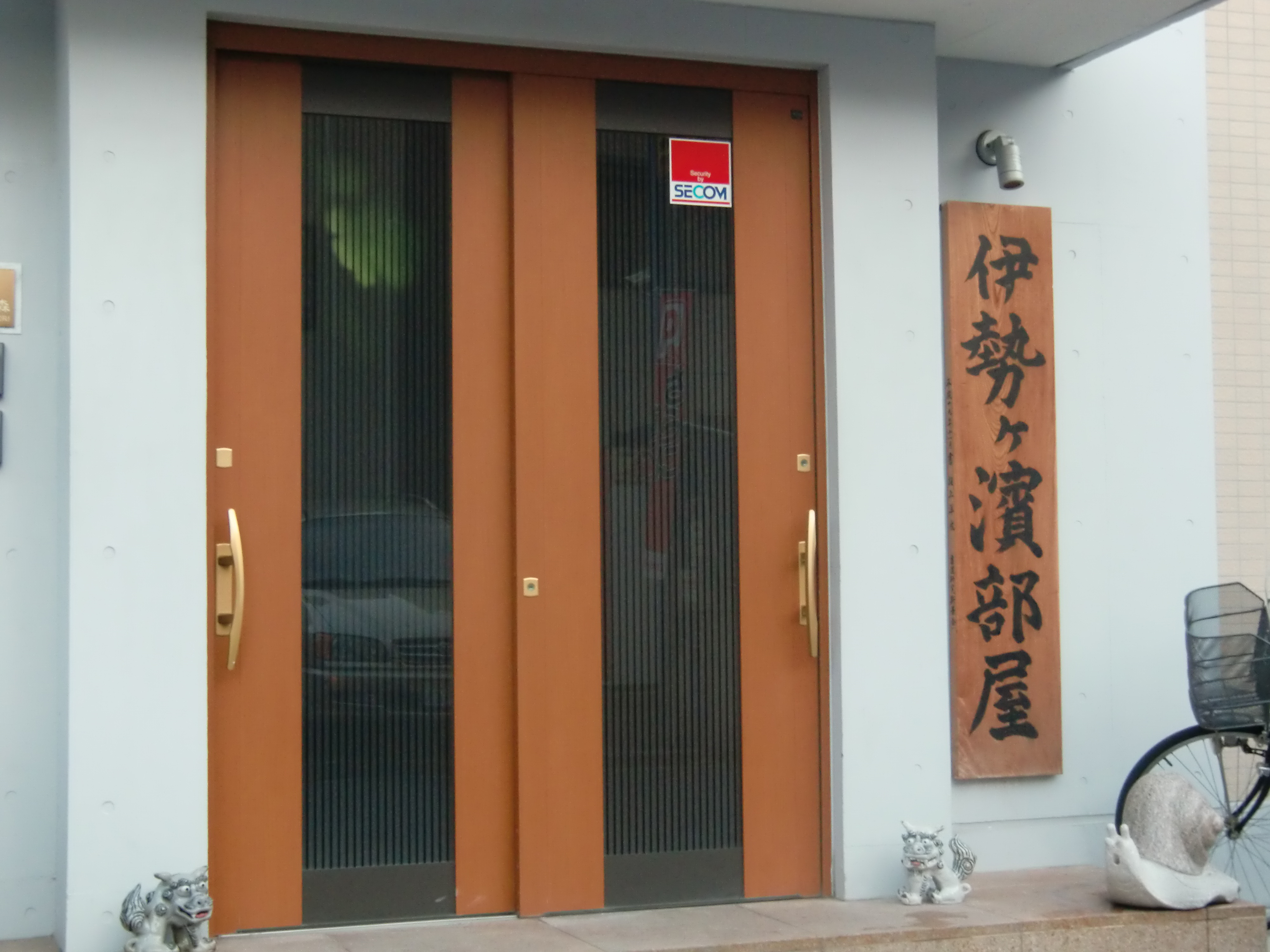

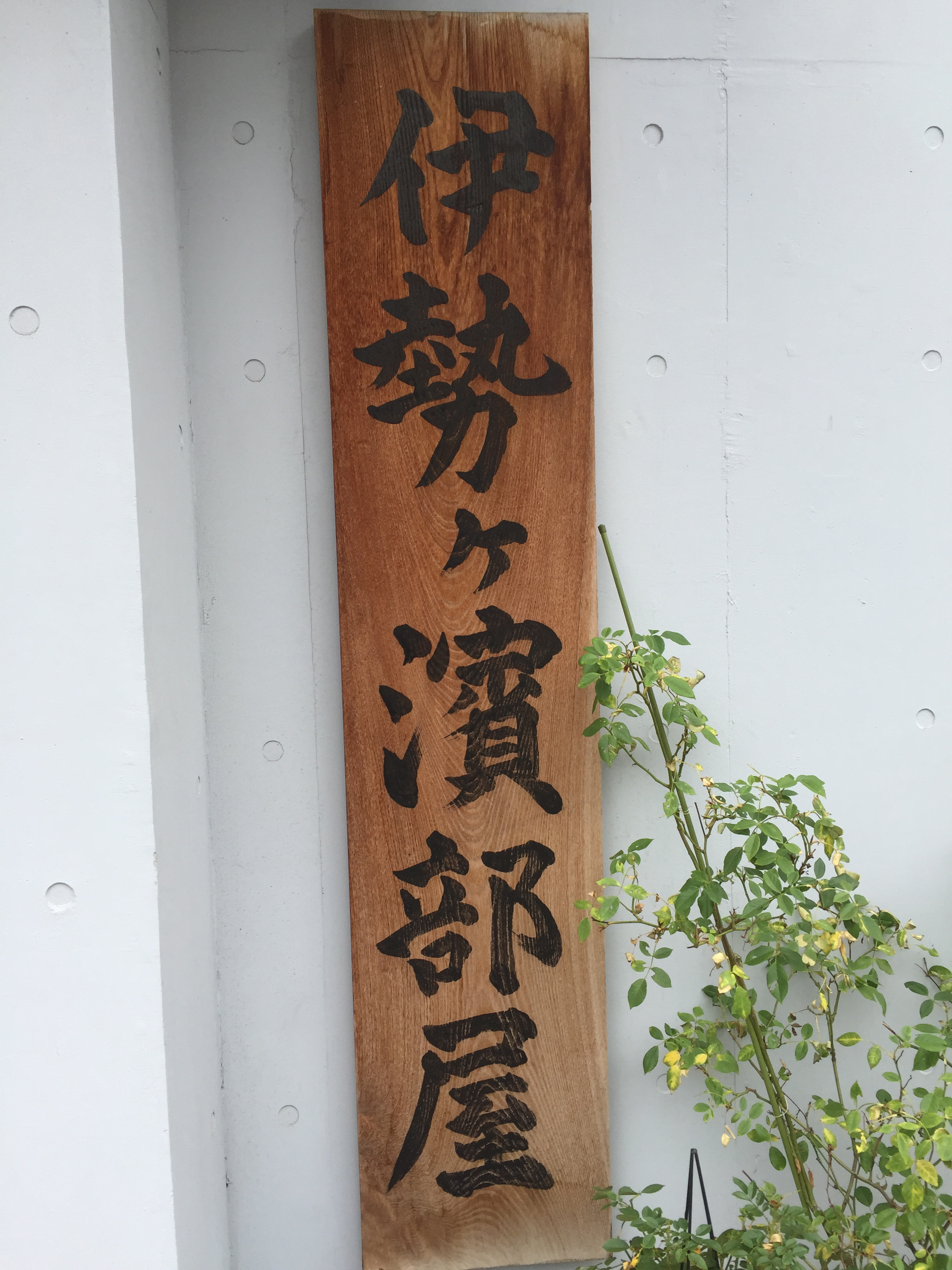

Isegahama stable (伊勢ヶ濱部屋, Isegahama-beya), formerly known as Ajigawa stable from 1979 to 2007, is a stable of sumo wrestlers, part of the Isegahama ichimon or group of stables. Its current head coach is former yokozuna Terunofuji.

Following the transfer of Miyagino stable's wrestlers and staff in March 2024, the stable's numbers climbed to become the most populous stable in the sport. As of May 2025, the stable had 37 wrestlers.

As of May 2026, the stable has 33 active wrestlers.

== History ==
The original Ajigawa stable was established in April 1979 by former sekiwake Mutsuarashi. He had originally hoped to become head of Miyagino stable and had married the daughter of the incumbent stablemaster there, but the marriage ended in divorce. He moved to Tomozuna stable upon his retirement in 1977 before opening up his new stable two years later. Ajigawa stable absorbed Kasugayama stable in 1990 on the retirement of its head coach. In April 1993 Asahifuji acceded to the Ajigawa name and took over the stable, due to the poor health of the incumbent. In late 2007 Asahifuji switched to the prestigious Isegahama elder name which had become available upon the retirement of its previous holder, maegashira Katsuhikari, thereby also changing the name of his stable. Asahifuji's decision to switch to the Isegahama name can be seen as an attempt to restore his ichimon's reputation (the ichimon was known as Tatsunami-Isegahama for many years before becoming solely Tatsunami; as a result of the success of the renamed stable the ichimon has been solely known as Isegahama since January 2013). He also moved the stable to new premises.

In September 2012, ōzeki Harumafuji won his second consecutive tournament and was promoted yokozuna for the next tournament. In March 2013, the stable absorbed the coach and wrestlers (Terunofuji, Wakaaoba and Shunba) of the Magaki stable. Magaki was shut down due to the poor health of Magaki. Isegahama stable had four of its wrestlers ranked in the makuuchi and jūryō divisions in 2017, although Harumafuji retired in November 2017 and ōzeki Terunofuji fell to the lower divisions through injury in 2018 before staging a successful comeback, eventually reaching the rank of (yokozuna in July 2021.

In March 2022, the stable managed to have six active sekitori wrestlers at the same time, with the promotion of, then 19 year-old, Atamifuji to the jūryō division for the March tournament, after a winning record at the top of the (makushita division.

In November 2022, the stable managed, in another rare occurrence, to have all six sekitori of the stable ranked at the elite first division makuuchi, with the promotion of then 20 year-old Atamifuji to the rank of (maegashira 15. The last time a stable had six sekitori in the makuuchi division was Musashigawa stable in March 2004.

In December 2022, two junior wrestlers in the stable were found to have acted violently against younger wrestlers, with the victims beaten with wooden beams and burned with chankonabe hot water poured on their backs. One of the wrestlers held responsible submitted his retirement papers, while another was handed a two-tournament suspension. Following the investigation, stablemaster Isegahama (Asahifuji) resigned his seat on the Sumo Association's board of directors.

In March 2024, the Sumo Association announced the temporary closure of Miyagino stable—also part of the Isegahama ichimon—and the transfer of its personnel to Isegahama stable for an indefinite period of time. This occurred in the aftermath of physical abuse at Miyagino stable from the former Hokuseihō and the subsequent punishment and demotion of its stablemaster, the 69th yokozuna Hakuhō. Commenting on the transfer, the top-ranked wrestlers in the stable, Terunofuji and Atamifuji, made positive comments, highlighting in particular the training opportunities to help the wrestlers progress. Following the resignation and final retirement of former stablemaster and coach Miyagino (the 69th yokozuna Hakuhō) in June 2025, all members of the former Miyagino stable were instructed to remain under the tutelage of Isegahama stable.

With the publication of the banzuke for the January 2025 tournament, Isegahama stable became the first stable in 22 years to include seven of its wrestlers in the (makuuchi division, a first since Musashigawa stable ranked seven of its own at the September 2003 tournament.

The Sumo Association announced in June 2025 that Terunofuji would take over the Isegahama elder stock and stable, due to the former Asahifuji reaching sumo's mandatory retirement age of 65 the following month.

Three of Isegahama's maegashira-ranked wrestlers collected five kinboshi, or wins over yokozuna, at the January 2026 tournament. Yoshinofuji collected two kinboshi on consecutive days, marking the first time that had happened in professional sumo in six years. The same feat was accomplished later in the tournament by eventual runner-up Atamifuji. A former Miyagino stable wrestler, Hakunofuji, won against yokozuna Ōnosato on Day 8.

In February 2026, the Japan Sumo Association's compliance committee was reportedly investigating allegations that the former Terunofuji physically assaulted Hakunofuji.

With the publication of the banzuke for the November 2026 tournament, Isegahama stable recorded ten active sekitori-ranked wrestlers—tying a 30-year-old record (set in the January 1996 tournament), when Futagoyama stable fielded eight wrestlers in makuuchi and two in jūryō.

== Ring name conventions ==
During its time as Ajigawa stable, most of the wrestlers' ring names started with the kanji 安 (pronounced a or an, meaning peaceful). Since the name change to Isegahama, a new pattern has taken hold, with many wrestlers having ring names ending with the characters 富士 (read: fuji), in deference to their coach and the stable's owner, the former Asahifuji, although other stables use this suffix too. The 照 ("teru") prefix is also common; examples are Terunofuji, Terutsuyoshi, Terumichi and Teruju.

The ring names for eight former Miyagino stable wrestlers changed on the January 2026 banzuke to include the fuji (富士) characters. Stablemaster Isegahama (the former Terunofuji) told reporters at the time that the former Miyagino wrestlers became his disciples, and they changed their names because "we wanted to move forward in the same direction." He added that one of Miyagino's former wrestlers, Enhō, had his wishes respected and did not change his name. As a result of these changes, 29 of the 31 wrestlers in the stable had the fuji (富士) characters in their ring names.

== Owners ==
- 2025–present: 10th Isegahama Haruo (iin taigū toshiyori, the 73rd yokozuna Terunofuji, born 1991)
- 1993–2025: 4th Ajigawa / 9th Isegahama Seiya (the 63rd yokozuna Asahifuji, born 1960)
- 1979–1993: 3rd Ajigawa Hiroaki (sekiwake Mutsuarashi, 1943–2002)

== Coaches ==
- Kiriyama Daisuke (toshiyori, sekiwake Takarafuji, born 1987)
- Tateyama Yoshiyuki (iin, maegashira Homarefuji, born 1985)
- Magaki Yoshito (shunin, maegashira Ishiura, born 1990)
- Miyagino Seiya (san'yo, the 63rd yokozuna Asahifuji, born 1960)

== Notable active wrestlers ==
- Atamifuji (best rank sekiwake)
- Yoshinofuji (best rank komusubi)
- Hakunofuji (best rank komusubi)
- Midorifuji (best rank maegashira)
- Nishikifuji (best rank maegashira)
- Takerufuji (best rank maegashira)
- Enhō (best rank maegashira)
- Toshinofuji (best rank maegashira)
- Arashifuji (best rank maegashira)
- Hananofuji (best rank jūryō)
- Mienofuji (best rank jūryō)
- Asahifuji (best rank jūryō)

== Notable former members ==
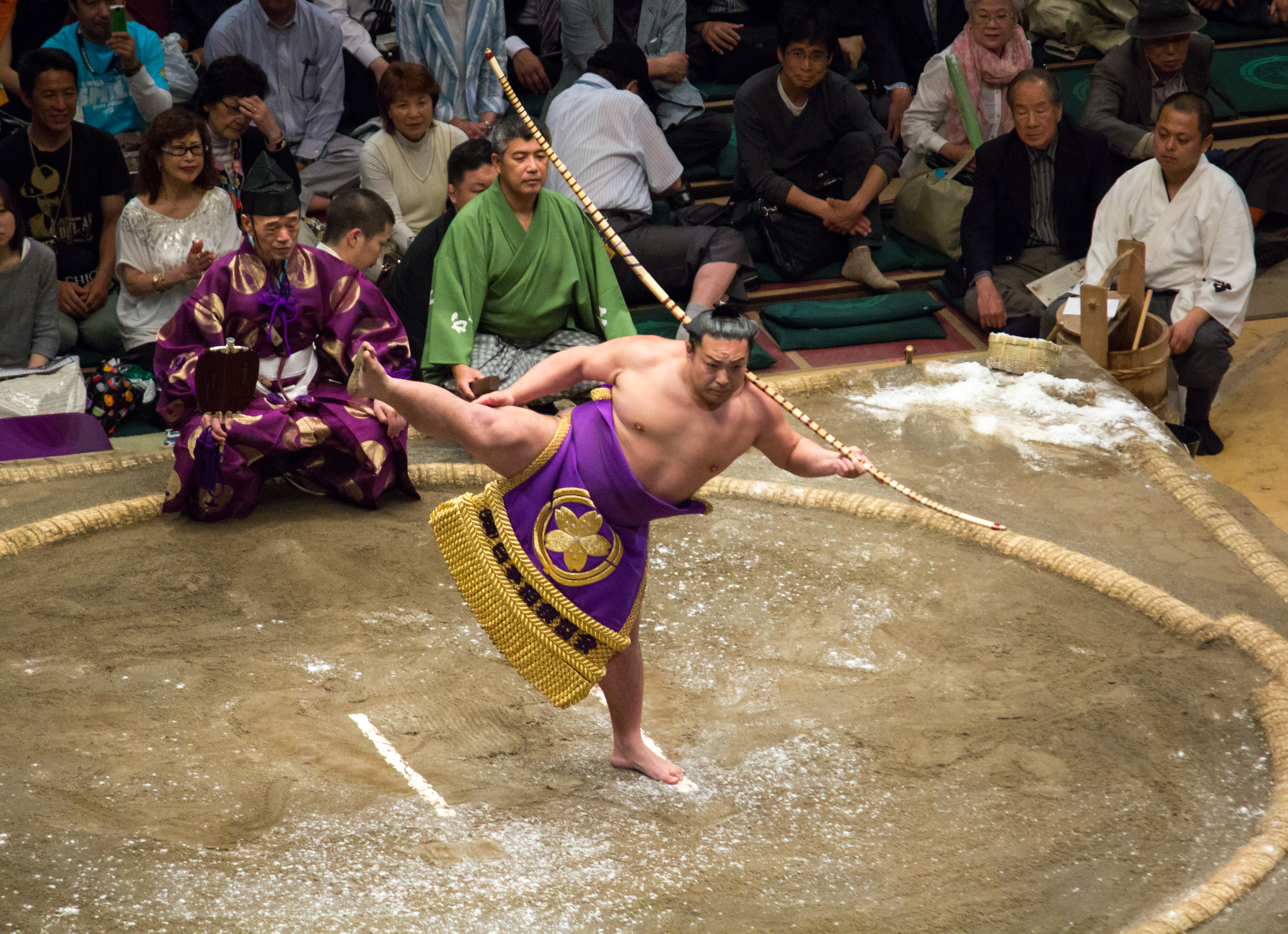
Satonofuji performing the bow-twirling ceremony.

- Harumafuji (the 70th yokozuna, born 1984)
- Terunofuji (the 73rd yokozuna, born 1991)
- Aminishiki (sekiwake, born 1978)
- Takarafuji (sekiwake, born 1987)
- Asōfuji (maegashira 13, born 1976)
- Homarefuji (maegashira 6, born 1985)
- Kasugafuji (maegashira 1, 1966–2017)
- Terutsuyoshi (maegashira 3, born 1995)
- Satonofuji (makushita 55, born 1977) – performer of the yumitori-shiki (bow-twirling ceremony)
- Takarakuni (sewanin, maegashira 2, born 1956)

== Referee ==
- Shikimori Seiichirō (makushita gyōji, real name Rikuto Fukuda, born 2000)
- Shikimori Seisuke (sandanme gyōji, real name Koshi Saikawa, born 2000)

== Ushers ==
- Teruki (makuuchi yobidashi, real name Takahisa Kudō, born 1968)
- Fujio (jūryō yobidashi, real name Shinsuke Onodera, born 1978)
- Teruya (makushita yobidashi, real name Daisuke Kondō, born 1982)
- Ryūji (makuuchi yobidashi, real name Ryūji Takahashi, born 1970)

== Hairdresser ==
- Tokotsukasa (fifth class tokoyama, born 2004)
- Tokoami (second class tokoyama, born 1986)
- Tokoshun (fourth class tokoyama, born 2002)

== Location and access ==
Mōri 1–7–4, Kōtō-ku, Tokyo 135-0001
Near Sumiyoshi station on the Toei Shinjuku Line and the Hanzōmon Line

== See also ==
- List of sumo stables
- List of active sumo wrestlers
- List of past sumo wrestlers
- Glossary of sumo terms
