= Asahifuji Hideki =

Mongolian sumo wrestler (born 2002)

Personal information
- Native name: 旭富士 英毅
- Born: Battsetseg Ochirsaikhan; May 17, 2002 (age 24) Ulaanbaatar, Mongolia
- Height: 1.87 m (6 ft 1 1/2 in)
- Weight: 148 kg (326 lb; 23.3 st)

Sport
- Sport: Sumo
- Rank: see below
- Heya: Isegahama
- Debut: November 2025
- Highest rank: Jūryō 12 (November 2026)
- Championships: Makushita (1); Sandanme (1); Jonidan (1); Jonokuchi (1)
- Updated on October 26, 2026

Asahifuji Hideki (Japanese: 旭富士 英毅; born May 17, 2002, as Battsetseg Ochirsaikhan (Note: Mongolian: Батцэцэгийн Очирсайхан)) is a Mongolian professional sumo wrestler. Belonging to Isegahama stable, he made his professional debut in November 2025 and won four consecutive lower divisional championships in 2026. His highest rank is jūryō 12.

After graduating from senior high school, he joined Isegahama stable as an unofficial trainee due to the rule requiring sumo stables to have only one foreign wrestler on their roster—a spot that was then occupied by Mongolian yokozuna Terunofuji; during this time, Asahifuji remained at the stable, training as a prospective recruit. It was during this period that he earned the nickname "strongest trainee in history" due to his training sessions with the sekitori at his stable, even before he had begun his career—a rare occurrence. After four years and following Terunofuji's retirement, Asahifuji was cleared to officially become a professional sumo wrestler and made his debut at the November 2025 tournament. Quickly inheriting the shikona (ring name) of his former stablemaster, yokozuna Asahifuji Seiya, he is considered a potential future yokozuna, and is nicknamed "Isegahama's ultimate weapon".

== Early life ==
Ochirsaikhan was born in Ulaanbaatar, Mongolia, to a single mother and has never met his father. At the age of 5 he was sent to live with his grandparents in a Ger district of Ulaanbaatar, as his mother left Mongolia to seek work in South Korea. His family has a tradition of wrestling, as he is the nephew of Olympic freestyle wrestler Ochirbatyn Burmaa. When he was younger, he played boxing and basketball. In 2018, he participated in a student exchange program and began attending Asahigaoka High School in Kanagawa. Among his seniors at that school were the future Ōnokatsu and Kyokukaiyū, both of whom were in their third year. During those years, he had relatively few opportunities to compete in team events. With the COVID-19 pandemic in full swing in Japan, many national and local competitions were also canceled, so Ochirsaikhan’s only competitive appearances were at the 2019 National Sports Festival and the 2020 New Year tournament. (Note: Held in lieu of the National High School Sumo Championships due to COVID-19 measures)

== Professional debut ==
Having failed to win a national title, Ochirsaikhan decided to become a professional sumo wrestler, joining Isegahama stable in 2021 at the invitation of the former yokozuna Asahifuji Seiya. Since the Japan Sumo Association allows each stable to recruit only one foreign wrestler, Ochirsaikhan was forced to wait four and a half years before he could officially make his professional debut, as he had to wait for his senior, Terunofuji, to retire. Meanwhile, the closure of Miyagino stable in 2024 and its subsequent merger with Isegahama stable raised concerns that the arrival of Seihakuhō, Miyagino's Mongolian wrestler, might take the foreigner spot allocated to Isegahama. However, since the Miyagino stable's staff were considered to be under Isegahama's sole supervision, it was announced that Isegahama would retain his slot for a foreign wrestler upon Terunofuji's retirement. During those uncertain years, Ochirsaikhan devoted himself to training, facing off against the strongest wrestlers in his stable—such as Takerufuji, Hakunofuji, and Atamifuji—and participating in joint training sessions with other stables, where he particularly distinguished himself by dominating future ōzeki Kirishima, who had come to train ahead of his promotion to professional sumo second highest rank.

Thanks to his impressive performances, Ochirsaikhan gradually became known by the nickname "strongest trainee in history", leading sports commentators to suggest that his skill level had already reached that of a san'yaku-ranked wrestler even before he had made his debut.

=== Asahifuji legacy ===
In November 2025, it was reported that Ochirsaikhan would inherit the shikona (ring name) Asahifuji (旭富士), which had been used throughout his career by his former stablemaster, former yokozuna Asahifuji Seiya. The decision came as a surprise, as it is extremely rare for a rookie—especially one with no professional experience—to be given the name of a yokozuna before even making his debut. The name is said to reflect the high expectations placed on the young wrestler, who is recognized as a potential future ōzeki or yokozuna. His ring name is also a reference to the name of his former high school, Asahigaoka (旭丘).

=== Winning streak ===
During his first professional match, a crowd of 200 people turned out to watch Asahifuji's victory. Now ranked in the jonokuchi division for the next tournament, Asahifuji won all of his bouts and the championship with a perfect 7–0 record. In March 2026, he continued his winning streak by winning the jonidan championship and remaining undefeated. In May, he repeated his success by winning the sandanme tournament. Asahifuji entered the July tournament in the makushita division. However, his winning streak came to an end in his fifth match, which took place on the ninth day of the tournament, when he was defeated by Nabatame. His streak of 25 consecutive wins, however, ranks as the third-longest for a wrestler since his professional debut. Despite his loss, Asahifuji managed to win his final matches, qualifying him for a playoff for the championship alongside six other wrestlers. Winning all three of his matches, Asahifuji claimed the championship, his fourth in a row. With this victory, Asahifuji became the first wrestler in the history of the sport to win the first four division championships in a row since his debut, following the introduction of the six-tournament-a-year system in 1958. Previously, only Haguroyama had won five in a row, from jonokuchi to jūryō, between 1935 and 1937, competing in two tournaments a year.

== Sekitori ==
Unusually, Asahifuji made an appearance during the summer tour, as the only non-sekitori wrestler to take part in the demonstration practices. During the September tournament, Asahifuji, ranked at the top of the makushita division, once again made a name for himself with a strong performance. On the fourteenth day, his sixth victory signaled his promotion to the sekitori ranks.

After the tournament, it was announced at the ranking meeting that Asahifuji's score would allow him to be promoted to the jūryō division. This promotion, achieved in just six tournaments since his debut, matches the promotion record for the fastest progress to the sekitori ranks set by Itai, Tosayutaka, Jōkōryū and Enhō since the six-tournament system was established in 1958.

In his first tournament as a sekitori, Asahifuji established himself as one of the tournament's top contenders, recording 10 consecutive wins before being defeated by another contender, Wakatakakage, who took the lead in the tournament.

== Fighting style ==
Asahifuji's most common kimarite, or winning technique, is yorikiri ('frontal force out'), and he prefers a moro-yotsu, or double-handed grip on his opponent's mawashi belt.

== Career record ==
Asahifuji Hideki
Year	January Hatsu basho, Tokyo	March Haru basho, Osaka	May Natsu basho, Tokyo	July Nagoya basho, Nagoya	September Aki basho, Tokyo	November Kyūshū basho, Fukuoka
2025	x	x	x	x	x	(Maezumō)
2026	East Jonokuchi #19; 7–0–P; Champion	West Jonidan #8; 7–0–P; Champion	East Sandanme #6; 7–0–P; Champion	East Makushita #11; 6–1–PPP; Champion	West Makushita #1; 6–1	East Jūryō #12; 12–3
Record given as wins–losses–absences Top division champion Top division runner-up Retired Non-participation Jūryō Lower divisions Sanshō key: F=Fighting spirit; O=Outstanding performance; T=Technique Also shown: ★=Kinboshi; P=Playoff(s); Divisions: Makuuchi — Jūryō — Makushita — Sandanme — Jonidan — Jonokuchi Makuuchi ranks: Yokozuna — Ōzeki — Sekiwake — Komusubi — Maegashira

== See also ==
- Glossary of sumo terms
- List of active sumo wrestlers
- List of Mongolian sumo wrestlers
- List of non-Japanese sumo wrestlers
- List of sumo record holders
