= Mutsuarashi Yukio =

Japanese sumo wrestler

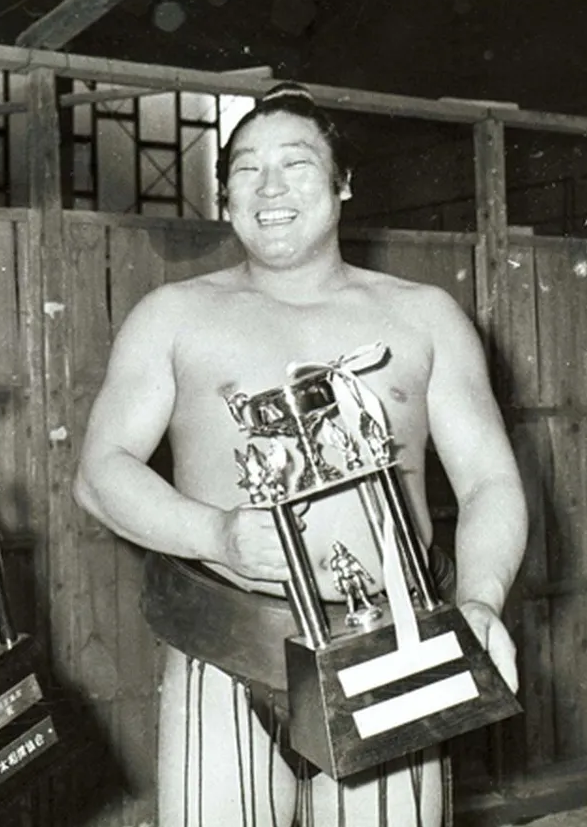
- Mutsuarashi after his makuuchi debut (1967)

Personal information
- Native name: 陸奥嵐 幸雄
- Born: Yukio Minami; January 12, 1943 Tōhoku, Aomori, Japan
- Died: July 30, 2002 (aged 59)
- Height: 1.77 m (5 ft 9 1/2 in)
- Weight: 113 kg (249 lb; 17.8 st)

Sport
- Sport: Sumo
- Retired: March, 1976
- Heya: Miyagino
- Record: 557-551-5
- Debut: September, 1961
- Highest rank: Sekiwake (March, 1971)
- Elder name: Ajigawa
- Championships: 1 (Jūryō); 1 (Makushita)
- Special Prizes: Fighting Spirit (4); Technique (1)
- Gold Stars: 2 (Taihō, Kashiwado)
- Updated on June 2020

Mutsuarashi Yukio (born Yukio Minami; January 12, 1943 – July 30, 2002) was a sumo wrestler from Tōhoku, Aomori, Japan. He made his professional debut in September 1961, and reached the top division in March 1967. He recorded 13 wins on his debut in the top division, a feat which has never been bettered and equaled only twice, by Kitanofuji in 1964 and Ichinojō in 2014. His highest rank was sekiwake. He retired in March 1976. He founded Ajigawa stable in 1979, although he was forced to retire early from the Japan Sumo Association in 1993 due to poor health and was succeeded by former yokozuna Asahifuji. He died in 2002 at the age of 59.

== Career record ==
Mutsuarashi Yukio
| Year | January Hatsu basho, Tokyo | March Haru basho, Osaka | May Natsu basho, Tokyo | July Nagoya basho, Nagoya | September Aki basho, Tokyo | November Kyūshū basho, Fukuoka |
|---|---|---|---|---|---|---|
| 1961 | x | x | x | x | (Maezumo) | East Jonokuchi #26; 5–2 |
| 1962 | East Jonidan #44; 4–3 | East Jonidan #31; 6–1 | East Sandanme #84; 5–2 | East Sandanme #35; 3–4 | West Sandanme #46; 4–3 | East Sandanme #35; 2–5 |
| 1963 | East Sandanme #56; 3–4 | East Sandanme #73; 6–1 | East Sandanme #25; 5–2 | East Makushita #88; 3–4 | West Sandanme #2; 3–4 | East Sandanme #8; 6–1 |
| 1964 | East Makushita #69; 5–2 | East Makushita #52; 3–4 | West Makushita #58; 5–2 | West Makushita #43; 4–3 | West Makushita #39; 5–2 | West Makushita #23; 4–3 |
| 1965 | West Makushita #20; 4–3 | West Makushita #14; 4–3 | West Makushita #9; 4–3 | West Makushita #7; 3–4 | West Makushita #11; 7–0–P; Champion | West Jūryō #15; 8–7 |
| 1966 | East Jūryō #12; 6–9 | West Jūryō #16; 9–6 | West Jūryō #10; 7–8 | West Jūryō #11; 8–7 | West Jūryō #5; 4–9–2 | East Jūryō #15; 10–5 |
| 1967 | East Jūryō #4; 11–4–P; Champion | East Maegashira #14; 13–2; F | East Maegashira #4; 7–8 | East Maegashira #3; 9–6 | West Komusubi #1; 4–11 | West Maegashira #4; 10–5 |
| 1968 | East Maegashira #1; 6–9 ★ | West Maegashira #3; 5–10 ★ | West Maegashira #5; 7–8 | West Maegashira #5; 12–3; FT | East Komusubi #1; 4–11 | West Maegashira #4; 9–6 |
| 1969 | East Maegashira #1; 5–10 | West Maegashira #5; 11–4 | East Maegashira #1; 4–11 | West Maegashira #5; 11–4 | West Maegashira #1; 7–8 | West Maegashira #1; 8–7 |
| 1970 | East Maegashira #1; 5–10 | West Maegashira #4; 11–4; F | West Komusubi #1; 6–9 | East Maegashira #2; 2–13 | East Maegashira #10; 10–5 | East Maegashira #2; 5–10 |
| 1971 | East Maegashira #4; 12–3; F | East Sekiwake #1; 4–11 | West Maegashira #1; 3–12 | West Maegashira #8; 9–6 | East Maegashira #2; 3–12 | West Maegashira #8; 9–6 |
| 1972 | West Maegashira #2; 6–9 | West Maegashira #6; 5–7–3 | West Maegashira #12; 10–5 | East Maegashira #6; 7–8 | West Maegashira #7; 9–6 | West Maegashira #2; 6–9 |
| 1973 | East Maegashira #6; 7–8 | East Maegashira #8; 8–7 | East Maegashira #6; 6–9 | West Maegashira #10; 8–7 | East Maegashira #8; 7–8 | West Maegashira #9; 8–7 |
| 1974 | West Maegashira #8; 8–7 | East Maegashira #6; 6–9 | East Maegashira #10; 7–8 | West Maegashira #10; 8–7 | West Maegashira #7; 2–13 | West Jūryō #3; 8–7 |
| 1975 | West Jūryō #1; 8–7 | West Maegashira #14; 8–7 | East Maegashira #11; 9–6 | West Maegashira #5; 8–7 | East Maegashira #2; 3–12 | East Maegashira #12; 8–7 |
| 1976 | West Maegashira #8; 7–8 | East Maegashira #12; Retired; 3–12 | x | x | x | x |
Record given as wins–losses–absences Top division champion Top division runner-up Retired Lower divisions Non-participation Sanshō key: F=Fighting spirit; O=Outstanding performance; T=Technique Also shown: ★=Kinboshi; P=Playoff(s); Divisions: Makuuchi — Jūryō — Makushita — Sandanme — Jonidan — Jonokuchi Makuuchi ranks: Yokozuna — Ōzeki — Sekiwake — Komusubi — Maegashira

== See also ==
- Glossary of sumo terms
- List of past sumo wrestlers
- List of sumo tournament top division runners-up
- List of sumo tournament second division champions
- List of sekiwake
