= Tachimochi =

Attendant in sumo

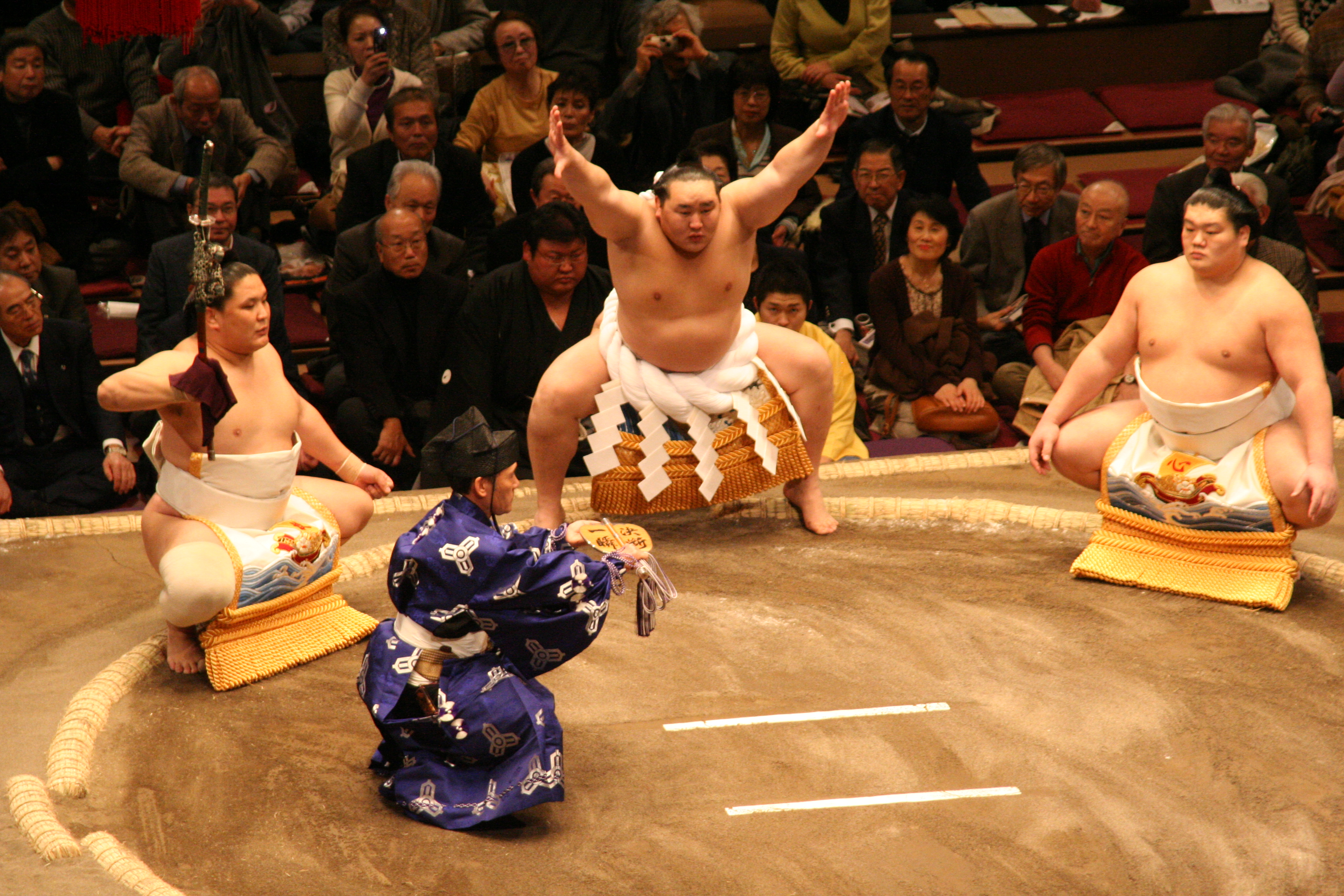
Asasekiryū (left) acts as tachimochi during his stablemate Asashōryū's dohyō-iri in January 2008.

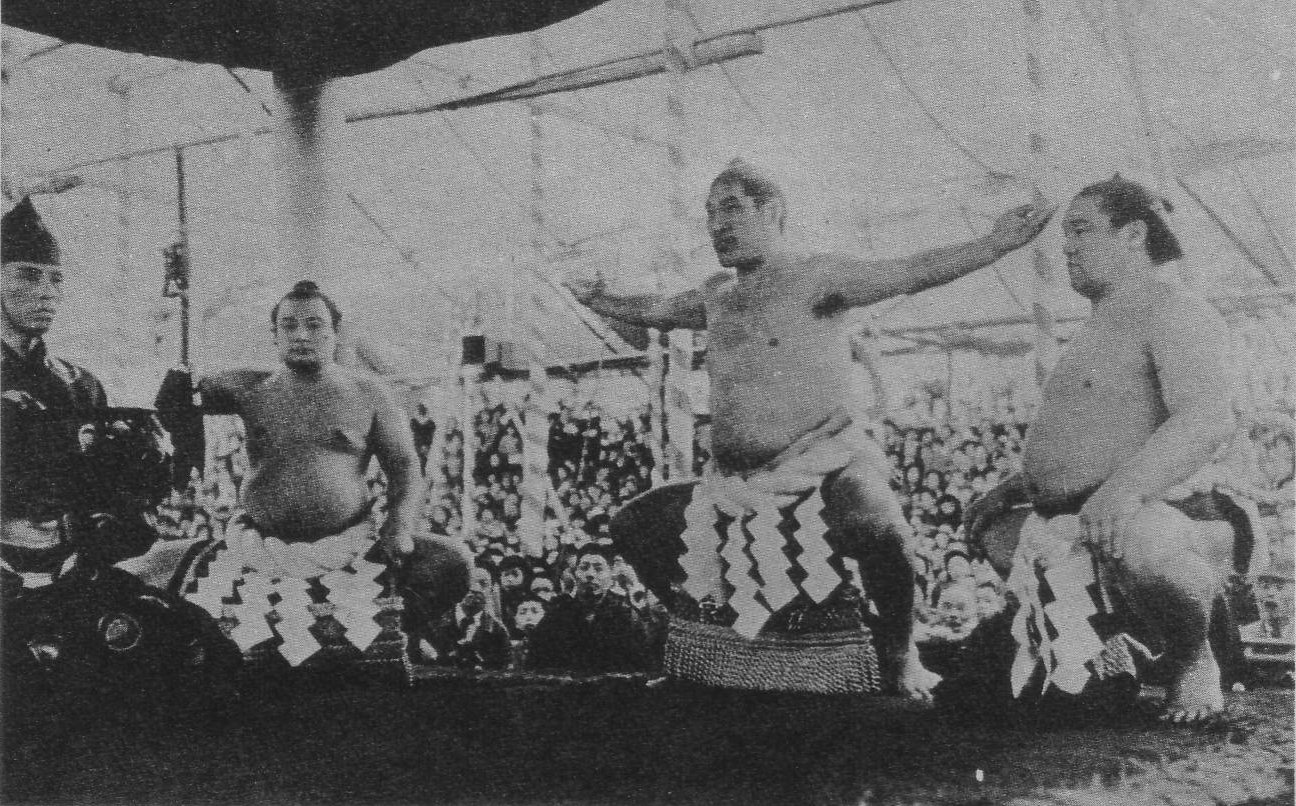
An example of a yokozuna acting as a tachimochi, at Minanogawa's retirement ceremony at the Yasukuni Shrine in 1942.

In professional sumo, the tachimochi (太刀持ち; lit.: sword carrier) is one of the two attendants that accompany a yokozuna when he performs his dohyō-iri, or ring entrance ceremony. The other attendant is called the tsuyuharai.

During the ceremony, the tachimochi will follow the yokozuna, carrying his sword in his right hand, to the ring and squat on his right hand side. The yokozuna's sword is a traditional indication of his samurai status. After the yokozuna has completed his ceremonial dance, the tachimochi will once again follow him off the dohyō.

The tachimochi must be a makuuchi ranked sumo wrestler (or rikishi) and is, if possible, from the same training stable (or heya) as the yokozuna. If there are no appropriate choices from within the stable then the tachimochi will normally be from another related stable (from the same stable grouping called an ichimon). The tachimochi is always the higher ranked wrestler of the two attendants.

All three wrestlers will wear a matching set of keshō-mawashi belonging to the yokozuna during the ceremony, and as the ceremony is directly after the ring entry ceremony for the makuuchi division wrestlers on a tournament day this means that the tachimochi will also wear the yokozuna's keshō-mawashi for his own entrance.

A wrestler who is scheduled to fight the yokozuna on a particular day of a honbasho (or tournament) will not act as his tachimochi.

In normal circumstances, the tachimochi will not be another yokozuna or an ōzeki. An ōzeki can act as a tachimochi during a wrestler's very first dohyō-iri, held at Meiji Shrine in Tokyo. A yokozuna will only usually fulfil this role at another yokozuna's retirement ceremony, or at a special event after the other yokozuna has announced his retirement, but before the final ceremony.
