= Tsuyuharai =

Attendant in sumo

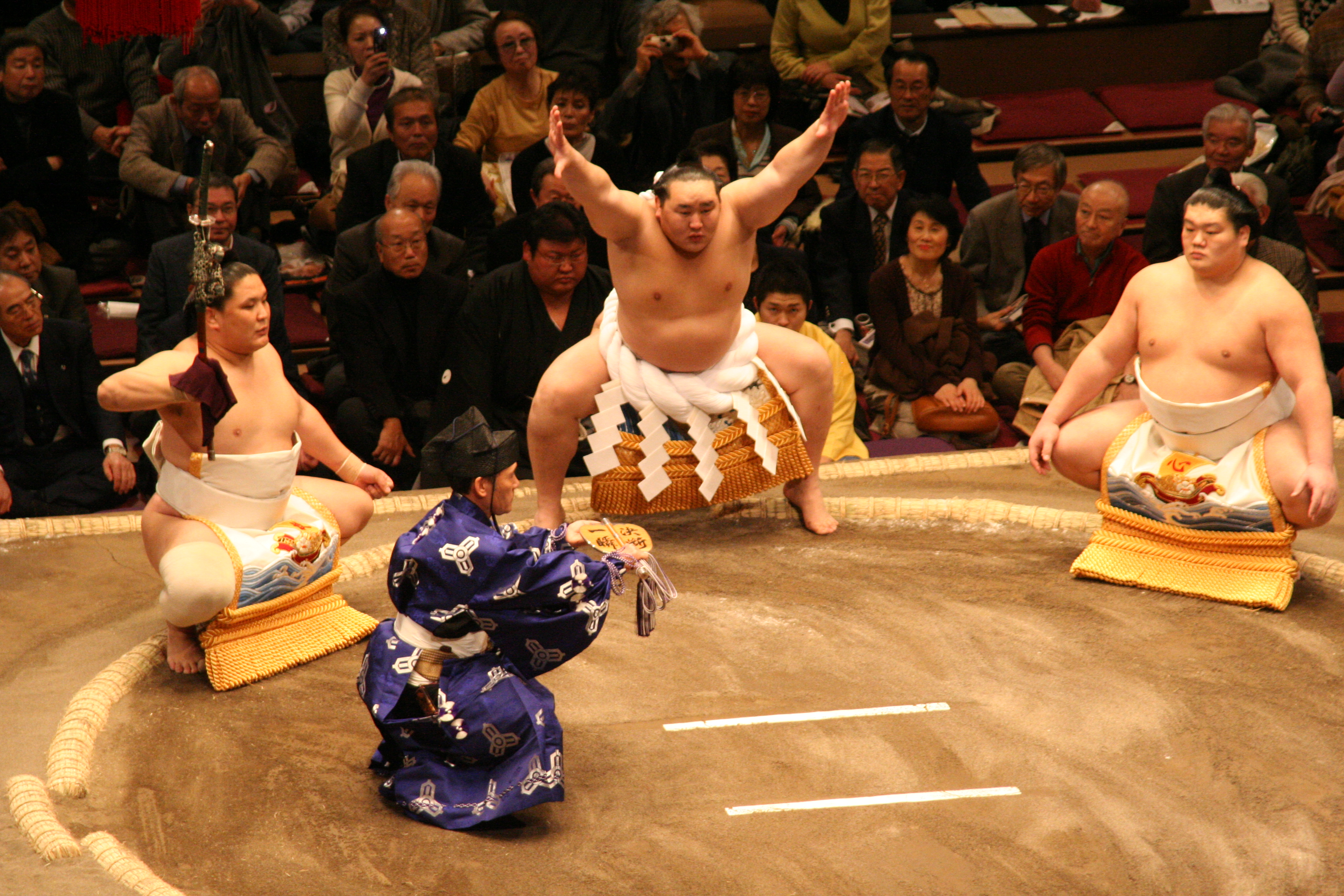
Hokutōriki (right) acts as tsuyuharai during Asashōryū's dohyō-iri in January 2008.

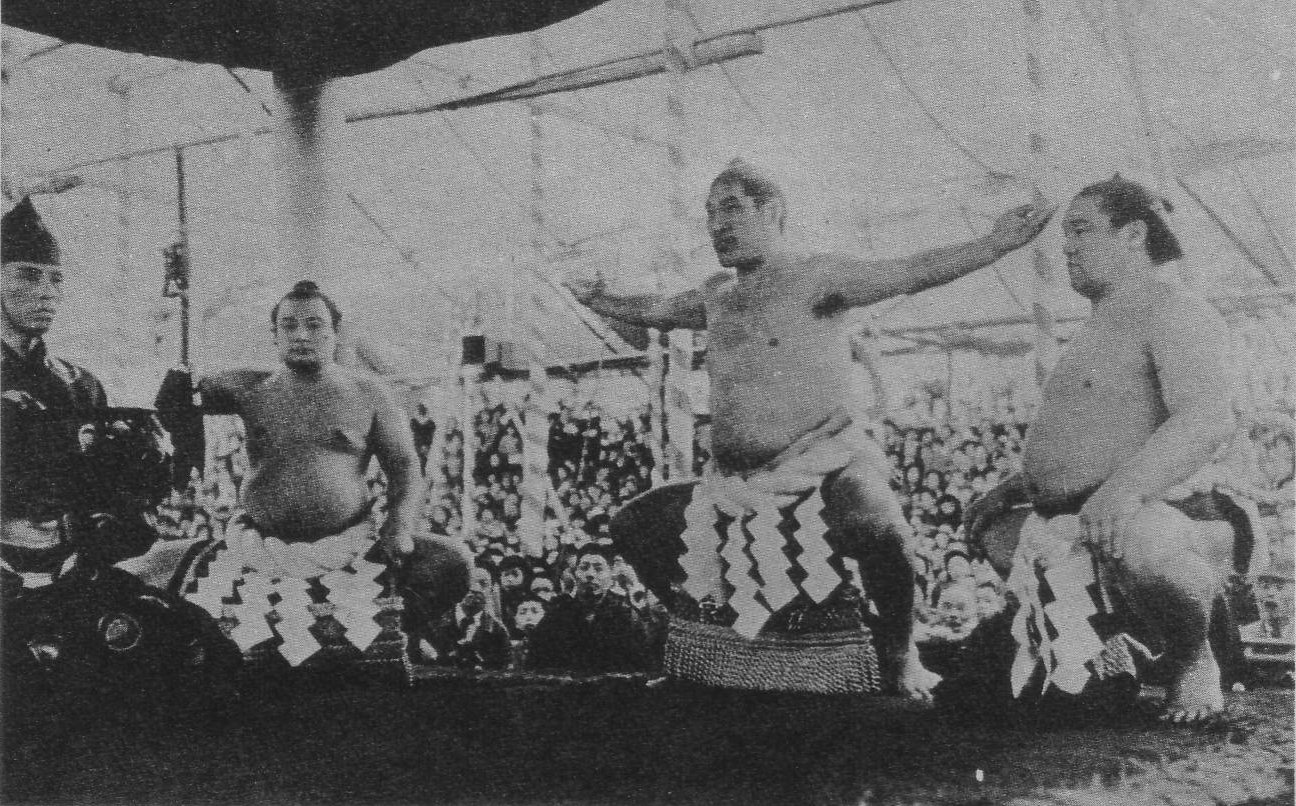
An example of a yokozuna acting as a tsuyuharai, at Minanogawa's retirement ceremony at the Yasukuni Shrine in 1942.

In professional sumo, the tsuyuharai (Japanese: 露払い, literally "dew sweeper") is one of the two attendants that accompany a yokozuna when he performs his dohyō-iri or ring entrance ceremony. The other attendant is called the tachimochi.

During the ceremony, the tsuyuharai will precede the yokozuna into the ring. He will usually be following the gyōji who leads the three wrestlers, or rikishi, to the dohyō. As the yokozuna performs the ceremony, he will squat on his left hand side. After the yokozuna has completed his ceremonial dance, the tsuyuharai will once again precede him away from the dohyō.

The tsuyuharai must be a makuuchi ranked sumo wrestler (or rikishi) and is, if possible, from the same training stable (or heya) as the yokozuna. If there are no appropriate choices from within the stable then the tsuyuharai will normally be from another related stable (from the same stable grouping called an ichimon). The tsuyuharai is always the lower ranked wrestler of the two attendants.

All three wrestlers will wear a matching set of keshō-mawashi belonging to the yokozuna during the ceremony, and as the ceremony is directly after the ring entry ceremony for the makuuchi division wrestlers on a tournament day this means that the tsuyuharai will also wear the yokozuna's keshō-mawashi for his own entrance.

A wrestler who is scheduled to fight the yokozuna on a particular day of a honbasho (or tournament) will not act as his tsuyuharai.

In normal circumstances, the tsuyuharai will not be another yokozuna or an ōzeki. An ōzeki can act as a tsuyuharai during a wrestler's very first dohyō-iri, held at Meiji Shrine in Tokyo. A yokozuna will only usually fulfil this role at another yokozuna's retirement ceremony, or at a special event after the other yokozuna has announced his retirement, but before the final ceremony.
