= 2026 in sumo =

The following are the events in professional sumo during 2026.

== Tournaments ==
=== January ===
Hatsu basho

Ryōgoku Kokugikan, Sumida, Tokyo, 11 January – 25 January

2026 Hatsu basho results - Makuuchi Division
W		L		A	East		Rank	West			W		L		A
10	-	5	-	0	(Mongolia)	**Hōshōryū**	Y		(Japan)	**Ōnosato**	10	-	5	-	0
8	-	7	-	0	(Japan)	**Kotozakura**	O		(Ukraine)	**Aonishiki***	12	-	3	-	0
11	-	4	-	0	(Mongolia)	**Kirishima**	S		(Japan)	**Takayasu**	8	-	7	-	0
4	-	11	-	0	(Japan)	Ōhō	K		(Japan)	**Wakamotoharu**	8	-	7	-	0
4	-	11	-	0	(Japan)	Ichiyamamoto	M1		(Japan)	**Yoshinofuji**	8	-	7	-	0
4	-	11	-	0	(Japan)	Ura	M2		(Japan)	**Wakatakakage**	9	-	6	-	0
5	-	10	-	0	(Japan)	Takanoshō	M3	ø	(Japan)	Hakunofuji	5	-	8	-	2
7	-	8	-	0	(Japan)	Daieishō	M4		(Japan)	**Atamifuji**	12	-	3	-	0
5	-	10	-	0	(Mongolia)	Tamawashi	M5		(Japan)	**Churanoumi**	9	-	6	-	0
9	-	6	-	0	(Japan)	**Hiradoumi**	M6		(Mongolia)	Ōnokatsu	7	-	8	-	0
7	-	8	-	0	(Mongolia)	Ōshōma	M7		(Japan)	**Fujinokawa**	10	-	5	-	0
7	-	8	-	0	(Japan)	Shōdai	M8		(Kazakhstan)	Kinbōzan	4	-	11	-	0
7	-	8	-	0	(Japan)	Gōnoyama	M9		(Russia)	Rōga	7	-	8	-	0
8	-	7	-	0	(Japan)	**Tokihayate**	M10		(Japan)	**Kotoshōhō**	9	-	6	-	0
6	-	9	-	0	(Mongolia)	Chiyoshōma	M11	ø	(Japan)	Nishikifuji	6	-	6	-	3
6	-	9	-	0	(Japan)	Midorifuji	M12		(Japan)	**Abi**	10	-	5	-	0
7	-	8	-	0	(Japan)	Tobizaru	M13		(Japan)	Tomokaze	4	-	11	-	0
9	-	6	-	0	(Ukraine)	**Shishi**	M14		(Japan)	Mitakeumi	7	-	8	-	0
6	-	9	-	0	(Japan)	Ryūden	M15		(Japan)	**Asakōryū**	9	-	6	-	0
9	-	6	-	0	(Japan)	**Asanoyama**	M16		(Japan)	**Ōshōumi**	10	-	5	-	0
8	-	7	-	0	(Mongolia)	**Asahakuryū**	M17		(Japan)	Hatsuyama	2	-	13	-	0

ø - Indicates a pull-out or absent rank
**winning record in bold**
**Yūshō Winner**
*** Won Playoff**

==== Playoff ====
- Aonishiki beats Atamifuji

=== March ===
Haru basho

Osaka Prefectural Gymnasium, Osaka, 8 March – 22 March

2026 Haru basho results - Makuuchi Division
W		L		A	East			Rank	West			W		L		A
11	-	4	-	0		(Mongolia)	**Hōshōryū**	Y	ø	(Japan)	Ōnosato	0	-	4	-	11
7	-	8	-	0		(Ukraine)	Aonishiki	O		(Japan)	**Kotozakura**	10	-	5	-	0
12	-	3	-	0		(Mongolia)	**Kirishima**	S		(Japan)	Takayasu	7	-	8	-	0
3	-	12	-	0		(Japan)	Wakamotoharu	K		(Japan)	**Atamifuji**	9	-	6	-	0
8	-	6	-	1	ø	(Japan)	**Wakatakakage**	M1		(Japan)	Yoshinofuji	7	-	8	-	0
8	-	7	-	0		(Japan)	**Fujinokawa**	M2		(Japan)	Churanoumi	4	-	11	-	0
7	-	8	-	0		(Japan)	Hiradoumi	M3		(Japan)	Ōhō	7	-	8	-	0
7	-	8	-	0		(Japan)	Daieishō	M4		(Japan)	**Takanoshō**	9	-	6	-	0
4	-	6	-	5		(Japan)	Abi	M5		(Japan)	**Kotoshōhō**	11	-	4	-	0
9	-	6	-	0		(Japan)	**Ichiyamamoto**	M6	ø	(Mongolia)	Ōnokatsu	1	-	6	-	8
6	-	9	-	0		(Mongolia)	Ōshōma	M7		(Japan)	Hakunofuji	5	-	6	-	4
5	-	10	-	0		(Japan)	Ura	M8		(Japan)	**Shōdai**	8	-	7	-	0
5	-	10	-	0		(Japan)	Tokihayate	M9		(Mongolia)	Tamawashi	5	-	10	-	0
10	-	5	-	0		(Japan)	**Gōnoyama**	M10		(Russia)	Rōga	5	-	10	-	0
6	-	9	-	0		(Ukraine)	Shishi	M11		(Japan)	Ōshōumi	5	-	10	-	0
9	-	6	-	0		(Japan)	**Asakōryū**	M12		(Japan)	**Asanoyama**	8	-	7	-	0
6	-	9	-	0		(Japan)	Tobizaru	M13		(Japan)	**Fujiseiun**	10	-	5	-	0
10	-	5	-	0		(Mongolia)	**Chiyoshōma**	M14		(Japan)	**Nishikifuji**	9	-	6	-	0
0	-	0	-	15	ø	(Japan)	Midorifuji	M15		(Japan)	**Mitakeumi**	8	-	7	-	0
10	-	5	-	0		(Mongolia)	**Asahakuryū**	M16		(Kazakhstan)	**Kinbōzan**	9	-	6	-	0
7	-	8	-	0		(Japan)	Fujiryōga	M17		(Japan)	**Kotoeihō**	9	-	6	-	0

ø - Indicates a pull-out or absent rank
**winning record in bold**
**Yūshō Winner**

=== May ===
Natsu basho

Ryōgoku Kokugikan, Tokyo, 10 May – 24 May

2026 Natsu basho results - Makuuchi Division
W		L		A	East			Rank	West			W		L		A
0	-	2	-	13	ø	(Mongolia)	Hōshōryū	Y	ø	(Japan)	Ōnosato	0	-	0	-	15
3	-	9	-	3	ø	(Japan)	Kotozakura	O	ø	(Ukraine)	Aonishiki	0	-	0	-	15
12	-	3	-	0		(Mongolia)	**Kirishima**	O	ø							
9	-	6	-	0		(Japan)	**Atamifuji**	S		(Japan)	**Kotoshōhō**	9	-	6	-	0
12	-	3	-	0		(Japan)	**Wakatakakage***	K	ø	(Japan)	Takayasu	2	-	2	-	11
7	-	8	-	0		(Japan)	Fujinokawa	M1		(Japan)	Takanoshō	7	-	8	-	0
11	-	4	-	0		(Japan)	**Yoshinofuji**	M2		(Japan)	Ichiyamamoto	6	-	9	-	0
7	-	8	-	0		(Japan)	Hiradoumi	M3		(Japan)	**Ōhō**	9	-	6	-	0
7	-	8	-	0		(Japan)	Daieishō	M4		(Japan)	**Gōnoyama**	8	-	7	-	0
5	-	10	-	0		(Japan)	Wakamotoharu	M5		(Japan)	Shōdai	6	-	9	-	0
9	-	6	-	0		(Japan)	**Churanoumi**	M6		(Japan)	Fujiseiun	7	-	8	-	0
5	-	10	-	0		(Mongolia)	Chiyoshōma	M7	ø	(Japan)	Asakōryū	3	-	4	-	8
8	-	7	-	0		(Mongolia)	**Ōshōma**	M8		(Mongolia)	Asahakuryū	5	-	10	-	0
5	-	10	-	0		(Japan)	Abi	M9		(Japan)	Nishikifuji	5	-	10	-	0
7	-	5	-	3	ø	(Japan)	Asanoyama	M10		(Japan)	**Hakunofuji**	11	-	4	-	0
10	-	5	-	0		(Japan)	**Ura**	M11		(Kazakhstan)	Kinbōzan	6	-	9	-	0
6	-	9	-	0		(Ukraine)	Shishi	M12		(Japan)	Tokihayate	4	-	11	-	0
10	-	5	-	0		(Japan)	**Kotoeihō**	M13		(Mongolia)	Tamawashi	2	-	13	-	0
8	-	7	-	0		(Japan)	**Mitakeumi**	M14		(Russia)	**Rōga**	9	-	6	-	0
9	-	6	-	0		(Japan)	**Tobizaru**	M15		(Japan)	Ōshōumi	4	-	11	-	0
9	-	6	-	0		(Japan)	**Wakanoshō**	M16		(Japan)	Ryūden	5	-	10	-	0
10	-	5	-	0		(Japan)	**Fujiryōga**	M17	ø							

ø - Indicates a pull-out or absent rank
**winning record in bold**
**Yūshō Winner**
*** Won Playoff**

==== Playoff ====
- Wakatakakage beats Kirishima

=== July ===
Nagoya basho

IG Arena, Nagoya, 12 July – 26 July

2026 Nagoya basho results - Makuuchi Division
W		L		A	East			Rank	West		W		L		A
7	-	7	-	1	ø	(Mongolia)	Hōshōryū	Y	(Japan)	**Ōnosato**	9	-	6	-	0
12	-	3	-	0		(Mongolia)	**Kirishima**	O	(Japan)	**Kotozakura**	8	-	7	-	0
12	-	3	-	0		(Japan)	**Atamifuji**	S1	(Japan)	Kotoshōhō	6	-	9	-	0
0	-	0	-	15	ø	(Japan)	Wakatakakage	S2	(Ukraine)	**Aonishiki***	12	-	3	-	0
6	-	9	-	0		(Japan)	Yoshinofuji	K	(Japan)	Ōhō	2	-	13	-	0
8	-	7	-	0		(Japan)	**Fujinokawa**	M1	(Japan)	Takanoshō	6	-	9	-	0
7	-	8	-	0		(Japan)	Gōnoyama	M2	(Japan)	Churanoumi	7	-	8	-	0
4	-	11	-	0		(Japan)	Hiradoumi	M3	(Japan)	**Hakunofuji**	9	-	6	-	0
10	-	5	-	0		(Japan)	**Daieishō**	M4	(Japan)	Ichiyamamoto	6	-	9	-	0
5	-	10	-	0		(Japan)	Ura	M5	(Mongolia)	Ōshōma	7	-	8	-	0
5	-	10	-	0		(Japan)	Shōdai	M6	(Japan)	Fujiseiun	7	-	8	-	0
11	-	4	-	0		(Japan)	**Kotoeihō**	M7	(Japan)	**Takayasu**	11	-	4	-	0
6	-	9	-	0		(Japan)	Wakamotoharu	M8	(Russia)	**Rōga**	9	-	6	-	0
10	-	5	-	0		(Japan)	**Fujiryōga**	M9	(Japan)	Tobizaru	5	-	10	-	0
9	-	6	-	0		(Japan)	**Asanoyama**	M10	(Mongolia)	Chiyoshōma	5	-	10	-	0
5	-	2	-	8	ø	(Japan)	Wakanoshō	M11	(Japan)	Mitakeumi	2	-	13	-	0
7	-	8	-	0		(Mongolia)	Asahakuryū	M12	(Japan)	Abi	7	-	8	-	0
10	-	5	-	0		(Japan)	**Nishikifuji**	M13	(Japan)	**Takerufuji**	10	-	5	-	0
9	-	6	-	0		(Kazakhstan)	**Kinbōzan**	M14	(Ukraine)	**Shishi**	10	-	5	-	0
4	-	11	-	0		(Mongolia)	Ōnokatsu	M15	(Japan)	Kazuma	5	-	10	-	0
6	-	9	-	0		(China)	Daiseizan	M16	(Japan)	**Asakōryū**	9	-	6	-	0

ø - Indicates a pull-out or absent rank
**winning record in bold**
**Yūshō Winner**
*** Won 3-way Playoff**

==== Playoff ====
(Two consecutive victories required to win the Playoff and the yūshō)

- Match 1: Atamifuji defeated Kirishima
- Match 2: Aonishiki defeated Atamifuji
- Match 3: Aonishiki defeated Kirishima

=== September ===
Aki basho

Ryōgoku Kokugikan, Tokyo, 13 September – 27 September

2026 Aki basho results - Makuuchi Division
W		L		A	East			Rank	West			W		L		A
12	-	3	-	0		(Japan)	**Ōnosato**	Y	ø	(Mongolia)	Hōshōryū	0	-	0	-	15
8	-	7	-	0		(Mongolia)	**Kirishima**	O1		(Japan)	**Kotozakura**	9	-	6	-	0
11	-	4	-	0		(Ukraine)	**Aonishiki**	O2	ø							
8	-	7	-	0		(Japan)	**Atamifuji**	S		(Japan)	**Fujinokawa**	11	-	4	-	0
5	-	10	-	0		(Japan)	Hakunofuji	K		(Japan)	Daieishō	5	-	10	-	0
5	-	7	-	3	ø	(Japan)	Kotoshōhō	M1		(Japan)	Kotoeihō	5	-	10	-	0
7	-	8	-	0		(Japan)	Takayasu	M2		(Japan)	**Yoshinofuji**	9	-	6	-	0
6	-	9	-	0		(Japan)	Gōnoyama	M3		(Japan)	**Churanoumi**	10	-	5	-	0
4	-	9	-	2	ø	(Japan)	Takanoshō	M4		(Japan)	**Fujiryōga**	8	-	7	-	0
6	-	9	-	0		(Russia)	Rōga	M5		(Mongolia)	Ōshōma	6	-	9	-	0
10	-	5	-	0		(Japan)	**Asanoyama**	M6		(Japan)	Ichiyamamoto	4	-	11	-	0
9	-	6	-	0		(Japan)	**Fujiseiun**	M7		(Japan)	Nishikifuji	7	-	8	-	0
9	-	6	-	0		(Japan)	**Takerufuji**	M8		(Japan)	**Hiradoumi**	9	-	6	-	0
10	-	5	-	0		(Japan)	**Ura**	M9		(Ukraine)	Shishi	7	-	8	-	0
7	-	8	-	0		(Japan)	Ōhō	M10		(Kazakhstan)	**Kinbōzan**	9	-	6	-	0
10	-	5	-	0		(Japan)	**Wakamotoharu**	M11		(Japan)	Shōdai	3	-	12	-	0
0	-	0	-	15	ø	(Japan)	Wakatakakage	M12		(Mongolia)	**Asahakuryū**	8	-	7	-	0
9	-	6	-	0		(Japan)	**Asakōryū**	M13		(Japan)	**Abi**	8	-	7	-	0
4	-	11	-	0		(Japan)	Tobizaru	M14		(Mongolia)	Chiyoshōma	5	-	10	-	0
8	-	7	-	0		(Japan)	**Asasuiryū**	M15		(Japan)	**Tokihayate**	8	-	7	-	0
0	-	0	-	15	ø	(Japan)	Wakanoshō	M16		(Mongolia)	**Toshinofuji**	9	-	6	-	0
3	-	12	-	0		(Japan)	Shōnannoumi	M17	ø							

ø - Indicates a pull-out or absent rank
**winning record in bold**
**Yūshō Winner**

=== November ===
Kyushu basho

Fukuoka Kokusai Center, Kyushu, 8 November – 22 November

2026 Kyushu basho results - Makuuchi Division
W		L		A	East		Rank	West			W		L		A
13	-	2	-	0	(Japan)	**Ōnosato***	Y		(Mongolia)	**Hōshōryū**	9	-	6	-	0
7	-	8	-	0	(Ukraine)	Aonishiki	O1		(Japan)	**Kotozakura**	8	-	7	-	0
10	-	5	-	0	(Mongolia)	**Kirishima**	O2	ø							
7	-	8	-	0	(Japan)	Fujinokawa	S		(Japan)	**Atamifuji**	11	-	4	-	0
4	-	11	-	0	(Japan)	Churanoumi	K		(Japan)	Yoshinofuji	7	-	8	-	0
10	-	5	-	0	(Japan)	**Asanoyama**	M1		(Japan)	**Fujiryōga**	9	-	6	-	0
6	-	9	-	0	(Japan)	Ura	M2		(Japan)	Fujiseiun	7	-	8	-	0
3	-	12	-	0	(Japan)	Takayasu	M3		(Japan)	Hakunofuji	5	-	10	-	0
5	-	10	-	0	(Japan)	Takerufuji	M4		(Japan)	Daieishō	5	-	10	-	0
4	-	11	-	0	(Japan)	Hiradoumi	M5		(Japan)	**Gōnoyama**	8	-	7	-	0
8	-	7	-	0	(Japan)	**Kotoshōhō**	M6		(Japan)	Kotoeihō	7	-	2	-	6
13	-	2	-	0	(Japan)	**Wakamotoharu**	M7		(Kazakhstan)	**Kinbōzan**	11	-	4	-	0
10	-	5	-	0	(Russia)	**Rōga**	M8		(Japan)	**Nishikifuji**	8	-	7	-	0
7	-	8	-	0	(Mongolia)	Ōshōma	M9		(Japan)	Asakōryū	1	-	10	-	4
0	-	11	-	4	(Ukraine)	Shishi	M10		(Japan)	**Ōhō**	9	-	6	-	0
10	-	5	-	0	(Japan)	**Takanoshō**	M11		(Mongolia)	**Asahakuryū**	11	-	4	-	0
9	-	6	-	0	(Japan)	**Ichiyamamoto**	M12		(Japan)	Abi	6	-	9	-	0
8	-	7	-	0	(Mongolia)	**Toshinofuji**	M13		(Japan)	Asasuiryū	4	-	11	-	0
5	-	10	-	0	(Japan)	Tokihayate	M14		(Mongolia)	**Dewanoryū**	8	-	7	-	0
10	-	5	-	0	(Mongolia)	**Tamawashi**	M15		(Japan)	**Kitanowaka**	9	-	6	-	0
7	-	8	-	0	(Japan)	Arashifuji	M16		(Mongolia)	**Kyokukaiyū**	8	-	7	-	0
3	-	12	-	0	(China)	Daiseizan	M17	ø							

==== Playoff ====
Ōnosato beats Wakamotoharu

ø - Indicates a pull-out or absent rank
**winning record in bold**
**Yūshō Winner**
*** Won Playoff**

== News ==
=== January ===
- 9: The Japan Sumo Association announces that Emperor Naruhito will attend the sumo tournament in Tokyo on 18 January (Day 8). It will be the first tenran-zumō (天覧相撲)–sumo performed in the presence of the Emperor–in six years.
- 10: The Sumo Association announces a record number of kenshō-kin (prize money envelope) applications at the upcoming January grand sumo tournament. There are applications for a total of 3,469 prize envelopes, which breaks the record set in September of last year. There are also 258 envelopes set to be distributed on 11 January, which will break the previous single-day record set in January of last year.
- 14: Top maegashira Yoshinofuji defeats Ōnosato after winning against Hōshōryū the previous day, becoming the first maegashira competitor in six years to defeat two yokozuna on consecutive days. This feat would be repeated later by Atamifuji, who entered the tournament having never earned a kinboshi.
- 16: The Sumo Association announces the retirement of former maegashira Daiamami.
- 18: Hakunofuji defeats Ōnosato in front of Emperor Naruhito, becoming the third wrestler since the start of the Shōwa era to collect at least one kinboshi in four consecutive tournaments.
- 22: Nishikifuji withdraws on Day 12 of the January 2026 tournament. His stablemaster cites returning neck and elbow pain stemming from earlier injuries.
- 23: Hakunofuji withdraws on Day 13 of the January 2026 tournament due to a ligament injury in his left big toe. Two days earlier, he appeared to collapse from his left knee during his loss to Aonishiki. Hakunofuji's scheduled opponent, Ōnokatsu–who was Nishikifuji's scheduled opponent the day before–becomes the fourth sumo wrestler in history to win two consecutive matches by default.
  The Japan Sumo Association announces that the election of directors and deputy directors for the new two-year term at the head of the organization will not be subject to a vote for the fourth consecutive term, as the number of candidates matches the number of positions up for election. It has also been announced that the exact occupancy of the positions will be revealed on 8 March.
- 25: The January 2026 tournament concludes with ōzeki Aonishiki winning the championship playoff against rank-and-file wrestler Atamifuji, securing his second consecutive Emperor's Cup. Aonishiki and Atamifuji were tied in the standings entering Day 15 with eleven wins each. After Atamifuji won his scheduled Day 15 contest, which eliminated opponent Ōshōumi and three others (Abi, Kirishima and Ōnosato) from title contention, Aonishiki defeated ōzeki Kotozakura to force a playoff–just like he did in the previous tournament last November. The two (12–3) leaders faced each other in the playoff, where Atamifuji pushed Aonishiki to the edge of the ring before Aonishiki stayed low and took his opponent down with a headlock throw. Aonishiki's victory marks the first time in almost 20 years, since Hakuhō in the May 2006 tournament, that a newly promoted ōzeki has won the championship. He is also the first wrestler in 89 years (since Futabayama in 1937) to win consecutive titles as a newly promoted sekiwake and a newly promoted ōzeki. Aonishiki will be a candidate for potential yokozuna promotion at the next tournament in March. The Sumo Association awards runner-up Atamifuji with his third Fighting Spirit prize, one of three special prizes handed out. A Fighting Spirit prize is also awarded to Kirishima (11–4) for the fourth time in his career. Yoshinofuji (8–7) collects his first Outstanding Performance prize; he has now collected at least one Special Prize in three of his four career tournaments in the top division.
  The jūryō division championship is won by 22-year-old Tochigi native Wakanoshō (12–3), who collects his first professional sumo title.
- 26: Two months after it was announced, Tokiwayama stable is transferred from the retiring Tokiwayama (former komusubi Takamisugi) to Minatogawa (former ōzeki Takakeishō) and becomes Minatogawa stable.
- 28: Three promotions from makushita to jūryō are announced for the March tournament by the Sumo Association. One of two wrestlers promoted to sekitori for the first time is 25-year-old Mongolian Toshinofuji, a recruit of yokozuna Hakuhō with two years of professional experience and one lower-division championship. He is the first sekitori promotion for former yokozuna Terunofuji since taking over Isegahama stable last year. The other is 19-year-old Fukuzaki, an All Japan Sumo Championship quarterfinalist as a high school student who debuted as a makushita tsukedashi competitor one year ago. In the March 2026 tournament he will take on the new shikona of Fujitensei (藤天晴). Former maegashira competitor Shimazuumi returns to the second-highest sumo division after six tournaments.
  The Sumo Association announced multiple retirements including former makushita Kaorufuji (香富士), a 23-year veteran and the last remaining active wrestler from the former Mihogaseki stable.
- 30: Sanae Takaichi, the first female Prime Minister of Japan, says that she will respect sumo traditions regarding women and not enter the dohyō. The remarks are in relation to the presentation of the Prime Minister's Cup, which is awarded to the winner of the top division at every grand sumo tournament. In the January tournament, special advisor Takahiro Inoue presented the Prime Minister's Cup to Aonishiki on her behalf.
- 31: The retirement ceremony is held at the Ryōgoku Kokugikan for the 73rd yokozuna Terunofuji.

=== February ===
- 1: The retirement ceremony for former maegashira Mitoryū is held at the Ryōgoku Kokugikan.
- 7: The NHK Charity Sumo Tournament is held at the Ryōgoku Kokugikan with over 4,300 in attendance. Among the musicians performing songs with sumo wrestlers was idol group STU48 and singers Miyuki Kawanaka and Kaori Mizumori.
- 8: Yokozuna Hōshōryū wins the 50th Japan Grand Sumo Tournament, a one-day tournament held for professional sumo wrestlers at the Ryōgoku Kokugikan, before 9,030 attendees. It is his second career win in the tournament. The Fighting Spirit prize recipient was maegashira Hiradoumi, who had only lost in semi-finals to eventual tournament champion.
- 13: Former top-division wrestler Daishōhō announces his retirement after a final tournament in the sandanme division where he had recorded a negative score.
- 24: The Sumo Association releases the rankings for the March 2026 tournament in Osaka, in which Ukrainian ōzeki Aonishiki vies for his third straight Emperor's Cup and promotion to yokozuna. The only change among the san'yaku ranks is the elevation of January runner-up Atamifuji to the fourth-highest rank of komusubi for the first time in his career. He is the first wrestler from Shizuoka Prefecture to be promoted to the upper ranks of sumo since Tenryū was promoted to sekiwake in 1930. There are two new promotions to the top division: Fujiseiun and Fujiryōga, both from Fujishima stable. 28-year-old Fujiseiun is a five-year veteran with four championships in the lower divisions, most recently in May 2024. Fujiryōga, who is promoted a few days before his 23rd birthday, is a makushita tsukedashi competitor who placed high in three amateur tournaments in 2024 before he debuted for Fujishima stable in March 2025. He picked up the jūryō title in his fifth professional tournament last November. Returning to the top division is 22-year-old Kotoeihō, whose only other tournament as a maegashira was in July of last year. Mongolian Tamawashi will appear in his 99th tournament in the top division, tying him with Ōshima (former sekiwake Kyokutenhō) for the third-most makuuchi tournament appearances in sumo history. As a result of the latest rankings, Kasugano stable is left without a sekitori-ranked wrestler for the first time in 91 years.
- 27: It is reported that the Japan Sumo Association's compliance committee is investigating alleged violent behavior by Isegahama (the 73rd yokozuna Terunofuji) against Isegahama stable wrestler Hakunofuji. According to reports, Isegahama himself informed the Sumo Association about the matter, and he along with Hakunofuji and Nishikifuji had been questioned by the compliance committee earlier in the week. On the same day that the news was reported, Isegahama admits to the press that he committed an act of violence.

=== March ===
- 6: The Sumo Association announces that Midorifuji will be absent from the upcoming March tournament due to heart failure. His medical certificate indicates one month of treatment. His absence from the entire tournament will likely result in his demotion to jūryō in May.
- 9: Two maegashira withdraw from the tournament following opening day losses. Ōnokatsu is diagnosed with a left ankle sprain after appearing to land awkwardly in his defeat to Ichiyamamoto. Hakunofuji re-aggravates a foot injury he sustained in the previous tournament. Both wrestlers would later re-enter the tournament, but Ōnokatsu is later forced to pull out for the second time.
- 10: Abi withdraws from the tournament due to a diagnosed spinal fracture following his loss to Ichiyamamoto on Day 2. He is the fourth sekitori to withdraw from this tournament. He later returned to the tournament on Day 9.
- 21: Sekiwake Kirishima maintains a two-win lead on the second-to-last day of the March 2026 tournament to officially clinch his third yūshō in the top division. Entering Day 14 as the leader with both Hōshōryū and Kotoshōhō behind him by two wins, Kirishima needed to defeat Aonishiki–whose yokozuna promotion bid already fell apart. Although Kirishima was defeated in his match, so were Hōshōryū and Kotoshōhō in their respective contests, resulting in their elimination from championship contention. Despite Kirishima's Day 14 loss, has totaled 34 victories over the last three tournaments as either a sekiwake or komusubi, which passes the 33-win threshold for a second promotion to ōzeki.
  Earlier in the day, it is announced that top maegashira Wakatakakage would withdraw after injuring his right arm in his Day 13 win, which gave him his eighth victory of the tournament.
- 22: Kirishima loses his final match against Kotozakura, but his promotion to sumo's second-highest rank is all but assured as a request is made to Sumo Association president Hakkaku to convene an extraordinary meeting of the Board of Directors. Four special prizes are handed out to four wrestlers. Tournament champion Kirishima collects his first Outstanding Performance prize for his third special prize in a row and ninth overall. Tournament runner-up Kotoshōhō wins his third Fighting Spirit prize. A Fighting Spirit prize is also awarded to maegashira debutant Fujiseiun. The Technique prize is awarded to Fujinokawa who collected the first two gold stars of his career at the tournament, having defeated both yokozuna Ōnosato and Hōshōryū on the third and fourth day, respectively. Meanwhile Aonishiki, who entered the tournament with the chance at yokozuna promotion, instead finds himself battling to keep his ōzeki rank in the next tournament after losing his eighth match.
  25-year-old Mongolian Dewanoryū (11–4) clinches the jūryō championship with a playoff victory over Wakanoshō (11–4), while former maegashira Tsurugishō becomes the first jūryō competitor in six years to post 15 straight losses in a tournament.
- 23: Hakkaku (the 61st yokozuna Hokutoumi) is elected for the sixth straight time as chairman of the Japan Sumo Association. Four oyakata are elected as association directors for the first time: Fujishima (former ōzeki Musōyama), Onoe (former komusubi Hamanoshima), Kataonami (former sekiwake Tamakasuga) and Oitekaze (former maegashira Daishōyama).
  The Sumo Association announces the retirements of former maegashira Chiyomaru and Hidenoumi.
- 25: Kirishima's second promotion to ōzeki is unanimously approved by the Sumo Association. He becomes the third wrestler since the introduction of the kadoban system in 1969 to return to the ōzeki rank after failing to immediately do so.
  Following the Sumo Association board meeting to determine the May tournament rankings, four promotions to jūryō are announced. The lone first-time promotion to sumo's second-highest rank is 24-year-old Ōkaryū, who entered professional sumo two years ago as a sandanme tsukedashi competitor. Three others return to jūryō: Hakuyōzan, Tochitaikai, and Enhō.
- 26: Sumo Association's director of public relations Fujishima (former ōzeki Musōyama), announces that the Sumo Association will hold an extraordinary meeting on 9 April to discuss the allegations of physical abuse involving Isegahama (the 73rd yokozuna Terunofuji). Earlier in the month, it was announced that Terunofuji would not be participating in the March tournament as a provisional measure.

The spring jungyō (regional tours) are held at the following locations in March:

- 29: Ise Shrine, Mie (Ceremonial tournament)
- 30: Neyagawa, Osaka
- 31: Kobe

=== April ===
- 6: The Sumo Association has announced the retirement of former maegashira Tsurugishō following his final jūryō rank tournament; a tournament in which he failed to secure a single victory.
- 10: After accusations of physical abuse at Isegahama stable by stablemaster Isegahama (the former Terunofuji), the JSA board of directors has announced that Terunofuji will be demoted two ranks in the hierarchy of toshiyori. He will face a 10% pay cut for three months- a lighter punishment than usual due to his remorse, his self-reporting, and the fact that wrestler Hakunofuji, the victim of the violence, had also had "intolerable behavior" that warranted reprimands from his master. As a result of his behavior, Hakunofuji is also receiving a formal warning.
- 27: The Japan Sumo Association publishes the banzuke for the May 2026 tournament in Tokyo. The release of the makuuchi rankings also finalizes the list of wrestlers who will participate in the international tour taking place in Paris in June.
  Kirishima had his second promotion to ōzeki following his championship victory at the March tournament. Atamifuji, who was just promoted to the san'yaku ranks for the March tournament, moves up another rank to become a sekiwake. Kotoshōhō is promoted to sekiwake, whose promotion after 35 tournaments in makuuchi makes him the tenth-slowest wrestler to reach this rank. Fujinokawa, one of the division’s youngest wrestlers, is promoted to the top of the maegashira ranks, just one rank away from making his san'yaku debut. Wakanoshō, the former January jūryō champion, makes his top-division debut after another standout performance in March. In doing so, he becomes the fifth wrestler from Tochigi Prefecture to enter makuuchi since the end of World War II and the first wrestler from Minatogawa stable to earn this promotion since the stable was taken over by former Takakeishō. Enhō, the popular wrestler and former makuuchi member, is also making his return to the salaried ranks, becoming the first former top-division wrestler in sumo history to return to the sekitori ranks after being demoted to jonokuchi.

The spring jungyō (regional tours) are held at the following locations in April:

- 1: Takarazuka, Hyōgo
- 2: Yasu, Shiga
- 3: Mukō
- 4: Himi, Toyama
- 5: Nagano
- 7: Komatsu, Ishikawa
- 8: Anjō
- 9: Mishima, Shizuoka
- 10: Narita, Chiba
- 11: Fujisawa, Kanagawa
- 12: Takasaki
- 13: Yasukuni Shrine, Tokyo (ceremonial tournament)
- 15: Kashima, Ibaraki
- 16: Yokohama
- 17: Kasama, Ibaraki
- 18: Tokorozawa, Saitama
- 19: Utsunomiya
- 20: Ishioka, Ibaraki
- 21: Adachi, Tokyo
- 22: Ōta, Tokyo
- 23: Fuchū, Tokyo
- 24: Saitama, Saitama
- 25: Funabashi
- 26: Iruma, Saitama

=== May ===
- 11: On the first day of the tournament, Hōshōryū, the only yokozuna participating in the tournament, withdraws from the tournament after losing to komusubi Takayasu.
- 13: On the fourth day of the tournament, Komusubi Takayasu withdraws after sustaining an injury on the third day during his match against Hiradoumi.
- 21: On the eleventh day of the tournament, Ōzeki Kotozakura withdraws after suffering a losing record. This withdrawal puts him in a kadoban situation for the Nagoya tournament.
  On the same day, maegashira and former ōzeki Asanoyama withdraws from competition, citing a Lisfranc ligament injury in his left leg.
- 24: The May tournament concludes with a playoff match between Wakatakakage and Kirishima. Both wrestlers entered the match with 12 wins and 3 losses each. This was their second match of the tournament, Kirishima emerged victorious in their previous bout on the eleventh day. Wakatakakage defeats the ōzeki by oshidashi and wins the second Emperor's Cup of his career. Although he had regained ōzeki status, Kirishima fails to win two consecutive titles, which would have allowed him to move toward the supreme rank of yokozuna. With this championship, Wakatakakage became only the eleventh wrestler ranked as komusubi to win a tournament since 1931. Given his performance, which was widely regarded as nearly flawless from a technical standpoint, many commentators expressed optimism about a possible promotion to the rank of ōzeki later in the year. The tournament's special prizes are presented to Wakatakakage, who wins his seventh Technique prize, as well as to Hakunofuji and Yoshinofuji, who each win their second Fighting Spirit prize, both wrestlers finishing the tournament with a 11–4 record.
  This month's jūryō tournament is won by Kazuma, who claims his fourth championship overall and his first as a sekitori, boosting his chances of promotion to the makuuchi division for the July tournament.
  In a rare occurrence, the makushita division title was decided in a playoff involving seven different wrestlers, with Ikarigata —the younger brother of makuuchi wrestler Fujinokawa— emerging victorious.
- 27: The Japan Sumo Association announces that only one wrestler, Arashifuji, will be promoted to the jūryō division for the Nagoya tournament. His promotion, coming just two years after his professional debut, makes him the ninth sekitori in his stable.
  A series of retirements is announced, among them is that of Wakatakamoto (Arashio stable), the older brother of top-division wrestlers Wakamotoharu and Wakatakakage. Although he failed to secure a promotion to the jūryō division—which would have made his family the second in the sport's history to have three brothers ranked as sekitori—Wakatakamoto will remain employed by the association as a wakaimonogashira. Another wrestler to retire is the former jūryō wrestler Yūma (Ōnomatsu stable).
- 28: The Japan Sumo Association announces the permanent closure of the Miyagino stable, citing the fact that more than two years had passed since the Miyagino staff had been placed under the supervision of Isegahama stable, that one year had passed since the departure of former yokozuna Hakuhō, and that no request to reopen Miyagino stable had been submitted to the board as of that date. Consequently, the decision considers the members of the former Miyagino stable to be fully part of the Isegahama stable.
- 30: The retirement ceremony for former komusubi Hokutofuji is held at the Ryōgoku Kokugikan.
- 31: The retirement ceremony for former sekiwake Takarafuji is held at the Ryōgoku Kokugikan.
  The Japan Sumo Association announces new arrangements for regional tours (jungyō) starting in 2027. The number of events will be capped at 70 per year, and they will last longer in each location. These decisions follow numerous absences from official tournaments due to injuries, which may be linked to the busy schedule that does not allow for proper preparation or rest.

=== June ===
- 6: The retirement ceremony for former maegashira Tsurugishō is being held in a hotel in Tokyo.

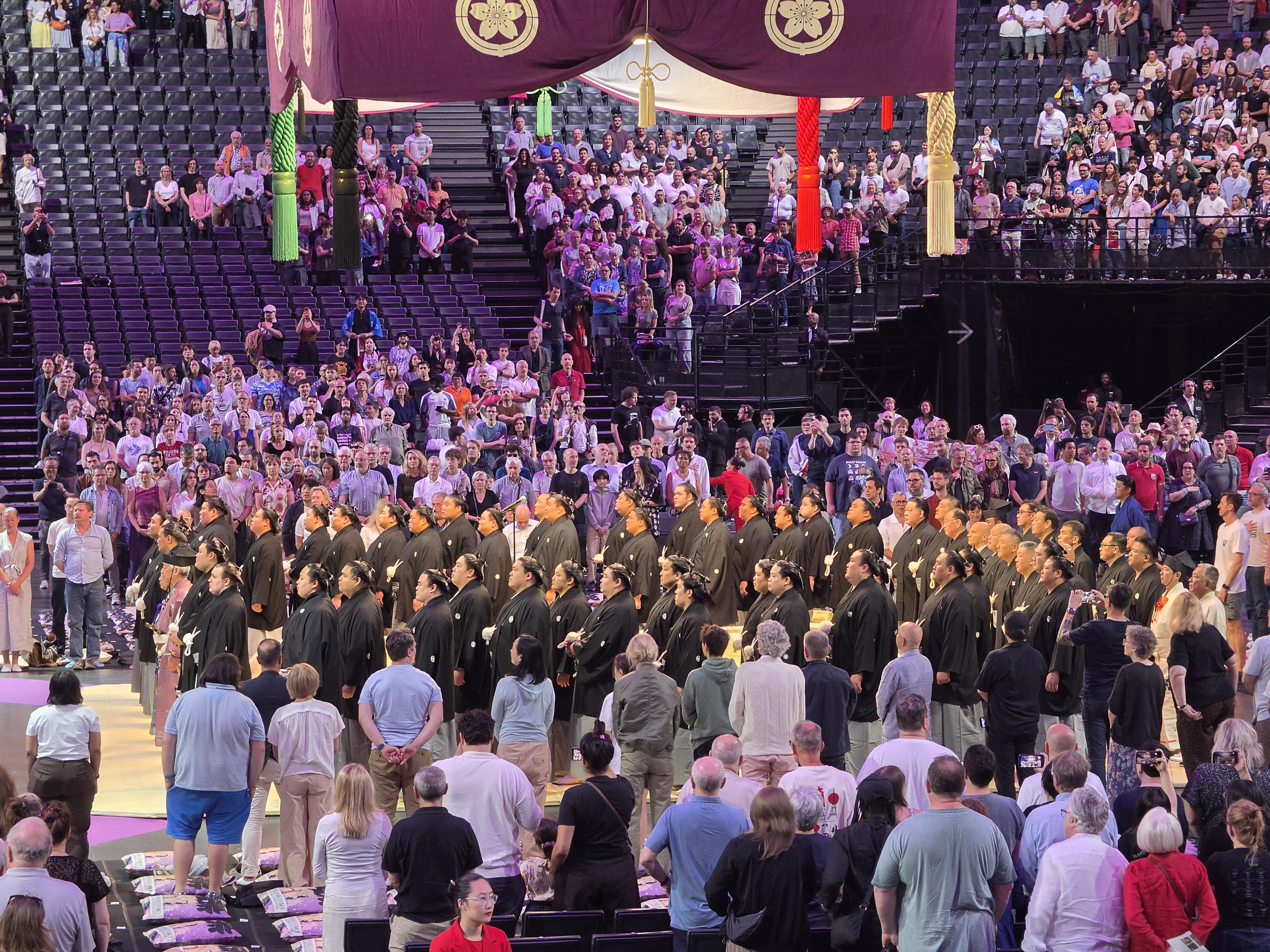
Executives, wrestlers and referees greet the audience at the Accor Arena in Paris at the opening of the 2026 Paris Sumo Tournament.

- 13: A two-day exhibition tournament sanctioned by the Japan Sumo Association begins at the Accor Arena in Paris. The tournament consists of two single-day competitions, with the winner of each day facing off on the final day to determine the overall champion. On the first day of competition, Kotozakura emerges victorious with a win over fellow-ōzeki Kirishima. This is the first time in 31 years that the French capital has hosted a sumo tournament.
- 14: Ōzeki Kotozakura wins the Paris tournament by defeating yokozuna Hōshōryū, who lost by yorikiri (frontal force out).
- 29: The Japan Sumo Association unveils the banzuke for the July 2026 tournament. This tournament presents ōzeki Kirishima with his second opportunity to be promoted to the highest rank of yokozuna if he manages to win the title. The ōzeki rank is also weakened by Kotozakura, who faces kadoban status for the second time in his career after withdrawing from the May tournament due to a back injury. Former ōzeki Aonishiki is demoted to the rank of sekiwake after missing the entire last tournament due to injury. This tournament still presents him with a chance to immediately return to the second-highest rank by winning at least 10 bouts. Wakatakakage, the winner of the last tournament, is also competing as a sekiwake after spending the last tournament as a komusubi. This tournament represents an opportunity for him to build on his success in May and secure a promotion to ōzeki for the November tournament. Kotoshōhō and Atamifuji both retain their sekiwake ranks, which they have held for two and three tournaments, respectively. The komusubi rank is held by Ōhō, who is returning to this level of competition for the first time since January. The second spot is held by Yoshinofuji, who is making his debut at this rank and, in doing so, reaches the highest rank of his career so far. Two wrestlers have been promoted to the makuuchi division for the first time: Kazuma, who won the most recent jūryō tournament, and Daiseizan, the second Chinese wrestler—since Sōkokurai in 2010—to reach the top division. Another notable ranking change is that of "Iron Man" Tamawashi, who is relegated to the jūryō division. With this demotion, there are no longer any wrestlers in the top division who were born during the Shōwa era.

=== July ===
- 6: It is announced that defending champion Wakatakakage will sit out from the Nagoya tournament after suffering a thigh injury during a training session on July 1st.
- 14: Fujinokawa remains undefeated against both yokozuna, becoming only the fourth wrestler in sumo history to win four consecutive bouts against a yokozuna. This has not been accomplished since the January 1931 tournament, when Musashiyama won his fourth straight victory against yokozuna Miyagiyama.
- 18: Wakanoshō withdraws from the tournament after suffering a contusion to his right femur during his match the previous day.
- 25: Hōshōryū withdraws from the tournament. His medical report cited an injury to his right medial collateral ligament and his right hamstrings, requiring approximately six weeks of recovery.
- 25: The Sumo Association announces the retirement of former maegashira Daishōmaru.
- 26: The July tournament concludes with the victory of sekiwake Aonishiki following a three-way playoff (tomoesen)—a first in nine tournaments. On the final day, three wrestlers (Atamifuji, Kirishima and Aonishiki) were still in contention for the championship, with Aonishiki leading the title race by a single victory. In the match between Aonishiki and Atamifuji, Atamifuji emerged victorious, bringing both wrestlers to a 12–3 record and ensuring a playoff. They are joined in the penultimate match by Kirishima, who also secured a 12–3 record after defeating ōzeki Kotozakura. After a coin toss, Atamifuji wins his first match against Kirishima before losing to Aonishiki, who in turn wins his second match against Kirishima, claiming the championship with a yorikiri victory. Aonishiki had already secured his return to the rank of ōzeki on the eleventh day by recording his tenth victory and, riding that momentum, went on to win his third Emperor's Cup. This performance makes him the first wrestler in the history of the sport to be demoted from the ōzeki rank, regain that rank in a single tournament, and win the championship in the process. The Japan Sumo Association honors makuuchi wrestlers by awarding the special prizes. The first wrestler to receive an award is Fujinokawa, who is honored with the Outstanding Performance prize for defeating both yokozuna. The Fighting Spirit prize is awarded to wrestlers who were among the top performers: Kotoeihō and Atamifuji, as well as Takayasu, who collects his seventh such award. Aonishiki, for his part, is awarded the Technique prize for the fourth time in his career.
  The jūryō division championship is won by Shōnannoumi (11–4) after a playoff involving four wrestlers (along with Asasuiryū, Toshinofuji and Arashifuji).
- 29: The Japan Sumo Association announces the promotion of three wrestlers to the jūryō division. The newcomers to the division are Tanji of Arashio stable, who is making his sekitori debut after debuting at the March 2022 tournament, and Tokifudō of Tokitsukaze stable, whose promotion marks the first time a native of Shizuoka Prefecture has reached the division since Atamifuji's promotion in March 2022. The third wrestler promoted is Nabatame of Futagoyama stable, who is returning to the division for the first time since July 2025 after an injury-induced demotion in the sandanme division.
  The retirement from the ring of five sumo wrestlers is confirmed, including former maegashira Daishōmaru.
- 30: The Japan Sumo Association announces an increase in ticket prices for most tournaments starting in January 2027, with the exception of the Nagoya (July) and Kyūshū (November) tournaments. The pricing system currently sets different prices for weekdays, holidays, and weekends, and now prices for the last two days of each tournament will also be adjusted separately and increased.
  Another reform, effective January 2027, will also adjust the salaries and bonuses of sumo wrestlers, for the first time in eight years. Sekitori's monthly salaries will increase by 10%, while wrestlers in the lower divisions will see a 6% to 9% increase in tournament allowances according to their ranks. Tour participation allowances will also be raised by 20% to 50%, depending on ranking. Bonuses for division champions will also be increased, as will those for wrestlers who receive the three special prizes.

=== August ===
- 7: The Japan Sumo Association announces the retirement of Izutsu (former maegashira Akiseyama) as a sumo elder. He had served as a coach at Kise stable upon concluding his competitive sumo career in 2023.
- 31:The Japan Sumo Association releases the banzuke for the September tournament. Ōzeki Kirishima is in position to claim the highest rank in the hierarchy for the second consecutive time after losing in the July tournament's playoff. Also ranked as an ōzeki, Aonishiki returns to that rank after recording the required minimum of ten wins and winning the last tournament, becoming the fourteenth wrestler of the Shōwa era to be promoted back to the second-highest rank. A strong performance in September would allow him to challenge for the supreme title of yokozuna later that year at the November tournament. Further down the rankings, Fujinokawa makes his debut as sekiwake, becoming the first wrestler from Kyoto Prefecture to reach this rank in nearly 200 years, a first since Hiodoshi in 1828. Also newly promoted to sanyaku is Hakunofuji, who makes his debut as komusubi. He becomes the second wrestler from Tottori Prefecture, after Kotozakura, to reach this rank and the first since 1964. The brothers Kotoshōhō and Kotoeihō are both listed at the highest rank in the maegashira ranks, with the latter having made the biggest jump in position (six spots) in this ranking. Meanwhile, the wrestler who dropped the most places was Wakatakakage, who had to withdraw from the last tournament, and was demoted from sekiwake to maegashira 12 east. The other wrestler who has dropped the most in the rankings is Ōhō, who has been demoted from the rank of komusubi to maegashira 10 east. Two new wrestlers are making their debuts in the top division. Asasuiryū is joining the division after a strong performance in July, despite failing to win the championship. With his promotion, he and his brother Asakōryū become the fourteenth pair of brothers to be ranked simultaneously in makuuchi. The other newcomer is Toshinofuji, who becomes the sixth wrestler from Isegahama stable to compete in the top division. Tokihayate and Shōnannoumi are also making their returns to the division.

The summer jungyō (regional tours) are held at the following locations in August:

- 2: Gifu
- 3: Yamagata
- 4: Kōfu
- 5: Kōriyama
- 6: Kitakata
- 7: Sakata
- 8: Shinjō
- 9: Shiroishi
- 10-11: Sendai
- 12: Ōshū
- 13: Sukagawa
- 14: Yokote
- 15: Akita
- 16: Hirosaki
- 18: Aomori
- 19: Misawa
- 20: Kesennuma
- 21: Ōsaki
- 22: Fukushima
- 23: Ōtawara
- 24: Kumagaya
- 25: Nagareyama
- 26: Kawasaki
- 27: Mito
- 28: Tsukubamirai
- 29: Sōka
- 30: Tachikawa

=== September ===
- 11: Hōshōryū officially announces his decision not to participate in the September tournament due to his recovery period following knee surgery in July. The yokozuna will miss part of a tournament for the third consecutive time, missing the first day for the first time since 2018.
- 19: Faced with growing difficulties in managing sold-out tournaments, the Japan Sumo Association announces a reform of its ticket reservation system to address the recurring dissatisfaction of fans who have been unable to secure tickets. In addition to penalties against ticket scalpers (including banning their accounts on ticketing sites and prohibiting entry if the ticket is merely a screenshot), the JSA announces that, starting in January 2027, association staff will have less leeway to reserve seats near the ring for their relatives. Reservation requests will no longer be processed on an individual basis but will be managed within the heya to reduce their number. Reservations will become impossible once the allocated quota is reached. A cap is also being implemented, limiting the number of seats a heya can reserve per tournament day to one box and 15 seats.
- 20: The Japan Sumo Association recordes 333 consecutive days of sold-out tournaments, reaching the halfway point of the record of 666 sold-out days set during the WakaTaka era, from the 11th day of the November 1989 tournament to the first day of the May 1997 tournament. The current streak has been ongoing since the sixth day of the January 2023 tournament.
- 24: Kotoshōhō withdraws on Day 12 of the 2026 September tournament after suffering a concussion during his eleventh match against Churanoumi.
- 25: Takanoshō withdraws on Day 13 of the September 2026 tournament, citing a ligament injury to his left ankle sustained during his twelfth match against Kotoeihō and requiring one month of treatment.
  The Sumo Association announces the retirement of former maegashira Yago.
- 27: Ōnosato defeats Aonishiki, with both wrestlers tied with a record of 11–3 on the final day of the tournament. The tournament's sole yokozuna claims his first championship of the year and his first since the September 2025 tournament. Ōnosato then appeares emotional for the traditional post-tournament interview, in which he praises his performance after a full year of battling injuries. Aonishiki, for his part, failes to secure a second consecutive championship victory, which would have propelled him into his second quest for the supreme title of yokozuna. Kirishima, who battled for his own bid, fails to claim the supreme rank and finishes the tournament with a barely achieved positive record. For his part, sekiwake Atamifuji, who had been in contention for the ōzeki rank, also finishes with a barely achived kachi-koshi score and will have to start his run from scratch. Two wrestlers receive special prizes for Fighting Spirit awarded during this tournament. Sekiwake Fujinokawa (11–4) finishes the tournament on a roll toward the ōzeki title, while maegashira Churanoumi (10–5) solidifies his case for a promotion to the sanyaku ranks for the November tournament.
  In the jūryō division, Kitanowaka claims the championship after a three-way playoff, first defeating Kagayaki and then Kayō to win the championship.
- 28 : The Japan Sumo Association announces that it will hold an exhibition tournament in Bangkok, likely scheduled for June 2027. The tour marks the association's third consecutive overseas appearance, following events in London in 2025 and Paris in 2026. The year 2027 will mark the 140th anniversary of diplomatic relations between Japan and Thailand, and the tour will be the association's first on the Asian continent in 14 years, following its performance in Jakarta in 2013.
- 30 : The Japan Sumo Association announces the promotion of two wrestlers to the jūryō division. The first is Asahifuji (Isegahama stable). The Mongolian wrestler joins the ranks of the sekitori in just six tournaments since his debut, matching the promotion records set by Itai, Tosayutaka, Jōkōryū and Enhō. A star recruit for his heya, Asahifuji is nicknamed the "most powerful recruit in history" after winning every division championship along the way—an achievement that notably earned him the shikona (ring name) of former yokozuna Asahifuji Seiya. The second wrestler is Ryūhō (Otowayama stable). The former junior high shcool champion and stablemate of Kirishima becomes the first sekitori trained by former yokozuna Kakuryū in his stable since its founding.
  The Sumo Association also announces the retirement of nine wrestlers, including Yamanobe (Dewanoumi stable), the great-grandson of former yokozuna Tsunenohana, and Dewanojo (Dewanoumi stable), the heaviest active wrestler in the sport.

=== October ===
- 1: The Japan Sumo Association announces a donation of 10 million yen to support reconstruction efforts in Kumamoto Prefecture following the 2026 Kumamoto earthquake. ¥10 million is also being donated to Chiba Prefecture to support reconstruction efforts following the 2026 Chiba flood. ¥671,181 of the ¥20 million was raised from the public during the September tournament.
  The Sumo Association also announces an update to its competition rules. The change in question concerns Rule 9 of the competition rules, which stipulates that a wrestler loses the match if his hair touches the ground, except in cases where the wrestler whose hair touches the ground is in the process of throwing his opponent, regardless of whether the hair touches the ground before the opponent does. Under the new rules, any wrestler whose hair touches the ground first will be declared the loser, regardless of whether he is executing a technique on his opponent.
- 3: The retirement ceremony for former maegashira Hidenoumi is held at the Ryōgoku Kokugikan.
- 4: The retirement ceremony for former maegashira Daishōhō is held at the Ryōgoku Kokugikan.
- 6: Wakamotoharu wins the All Japan Rikishi Championship, a Meiji Shrine sponsored charity tournament, after defeating Ura. He wins the tournament for the first time and just one day after his birthday.
- 26: The Japan Sumo Association unveils the banzuke for the November tournament in Fukuoka. There are no notable changes in the top three ranks. Just below, Churanoumi becomes the first wrestler from Okinawa Prefecture in the sport's history to be promoted to the san'yaku ranks, reaching the rank of komusubi for the first time in his career. With this promotion, all 47 Japanese prefectures have now had a wrestler reach this level of the top division. Yoshinofuji, also ranked as komusubi, returns to this rank for the first time since the July tournament. At the bottom of the rankings, his stablemate Arashifuji makes his debut in the top division. With Asahifuji's promotion to jūryō, Isegahama stable maintains its status as the stable with the most active sekitori, fielding ten active wrestlers for the November tournament—tying a 30-year-old record (set in the January 1996 tournament), when Futagoyama stable fielded eight wrestlers in makuuchi and two in jūryō. The other newcomers to the top division are the Mongolians Dewanoryū and Kyokukaiyū. In the round of promotions and demotions, six wrestlers are demoted to the second division, including former ōzeki Shōdai, former sekiwake Wakatakakage, and former komusubi Tobizaru. This is the first time in eleven years that so many wrestlers have been demoted. Returning to the makuuchi division, Tamawashi, at 41 years and 11 months, becomes the oldest wrestler since the Shōwa era to return to the top division, surpassing Aminishiki upon his reinstatement for the May 2018 tournament (at the age of 39 years and 7 months). Exceptionally, promotions for the two tate-gyōji spots take effect in November rather than in January.
- 31: The retirement ceremony for former maegashira Daiamami is held at the Fukuoka city hall.

The autumn jungyō (regional tours) are held at the following locations in October:

- 6: Tsukuba
- 7: Ebina
- 8: Sayama
- 9: Chichibu
- 10: Matsumoto
- 11: Imizu
- 12: Kanazawa
- 13: Kahoku
- 14: Takayama
- 15: Nagahama
- 16: Kyoto
- 17: Osaka
- 18: Himeji
- 20: Akashi
- 21: Okayama
- 22: Wake
- 23: Kasaoka
- 24: Hiroshima
- 25: Ube

=== November ===
- 8: Former maegashira Shirokuma withdraws on the first day of the tournament du to an injury to the lateral ligament in his right ankle.
- 10: Kotoeihō withdraws from the November tournament citing a cervical disc herniation requiring four weeks of rest. Despite the recovery time, Kotoeihō joined the tournament on the tenth day.
- 11: Exceptionally, no maezumo matches are being held for the November tournament, since the only two new Japanese recruits belongs to the same heya (Shikoroyama stable). Normally, this preliminary competition—held starting on the third day of a tournament—is used to determine the jonokuchi rankings for new recruits. In the absence of maezumo bouts, it has been announced that the order of the future rankings will be determined by the order of registration of the new recruits. The two other recruits who arrived in October (both foreign) have to wait another two months to actually compete, while they await their work visas.
- 18: Shishi and Asakōryū, both ranked as maegashira, are withdrawing from the November tournament. Shishi, who has suffered ten consecutive losses, is dealing with complications from heterotopic ossification of his left acromioclavicular joint. Asakōryū, who has suffered nine consecutive losses, is withdrawing due to pain in his knees and lower back.
- 22: The final tournament of 2026 concludes with a victory for yokozuna Ōnosato after a playoff against the tournament's other co-leader, Wakamotoharu. The maegashira was aiming for his very first title and had led the competition throughout, tied with the yokozuna. Furthermore, he and his brother, Wakatakakage—winner of that month jūryō championship—had the chance to become the first pair of brothers in the history of the sport to win both titles in the same tournament. However, Wakamotoharu suffered a defeat by watashikomi, securing the yokozuna's seventh title. Ōnosato thus wins his second consecutive championship. It is the first November championship of his career and only his second outside of a tournament held in Tokyo. The Japan Sumo Association honors the makuuchi wrestlers by presenting special prizes to Atamifuji, who wins the first Outstanding Performance prize of his career for defeating both yokozuna and two of the ōzeki. The 42-year-old veteran Tamawashi is awarded a Fighting Spirit prize for his ten wins and his continuing string of record-breaking performances. Kazakh wrestler Kinbōzan also receives the same prize for his eleven wins. Wakamotoharu, meanwhile, is awarded his second Technique Prize. Wakamotoharu's loss also marks the first time in thirteen years that no wrestler has won a first title in a given season.

== Deaths ==
- 29 January: Former maegashira Sentoryū, aged 56, of lung disease.
- 8 February: Former komusubi Takanofuji, aged 62, of unknown cause.
- 15 March: Former ōzeki Wakashimazu, aged 69, of pneumonia.
- 3 April: Former jūryō Mutsuhokkai, aged 61, of a heart condition.
- 31 May: Former sekiwake Hasegawa, aged 81, due to pancreatic cancer.
- 26 July: Former sekiwake Kitaseumi, aged 78, from natural causes.
- 10 September: Former komusubi Futagodake, aged 82, of hepatocellular carcinoma.
- 13 November: Former makushita Kaizen, aged 33, of stomach cancer.

== See also ==
- Glossary of sumo terms
- List of active sumo wrestlers
- List of years in sumo
