= Daiseizan Daisuke =

Chinese sumo wrestler

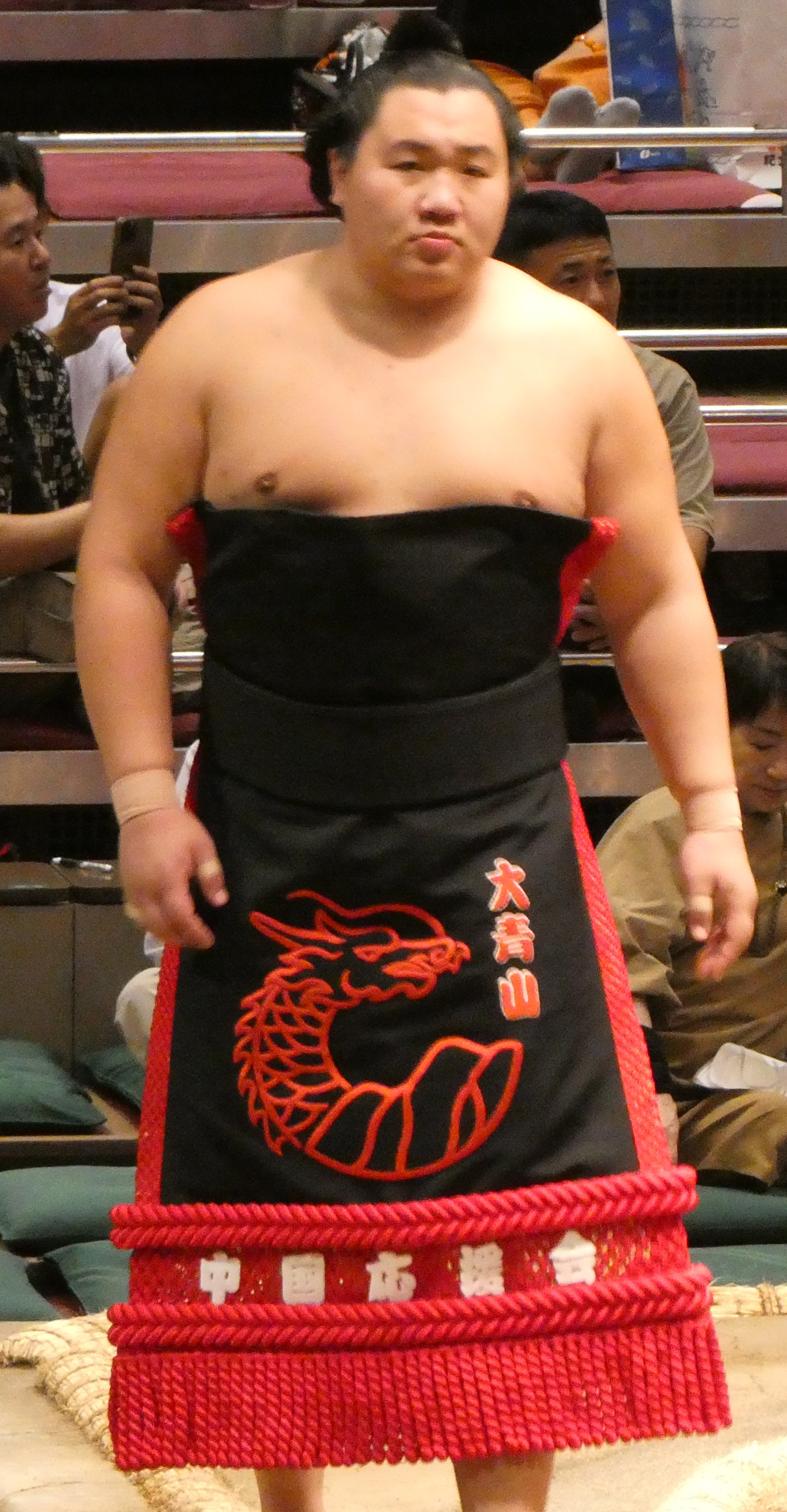
- Daiseizan during the 2024 November tournament

Personal information
- Native name: 大青山 大介
- Born: Asihada; May 22, 2000 (age 26) Hohhot, Inner Mongolia, China
- Height: 1.92 m (6 ft 3 1/2 in)
- Weight: 164 kg (362 lb; 25.8 st)

Sport
- Sport: Sumo
- Rank: see below
- Heya: Arashio
- Debut: March 2022
- Highest rank: Maegashira 16 (July 2026)
- Championships: 1 (Makushita)
- Updated on July 3, 2026

Daiseizan Daisuke (大青山 大介; born May 22, 2000 as Asihada (Chinese: 阿斯哈达, Mongolian: Алтан)) is an ethnic Mongol Chinese professional sumo wrestler. Wrestling for Arashio stable, his highest rank is maegashira 16.

== Early life ==
Asihada was born in China's Inner Mongolia province. In middle school, he played basketball. In his second year, he went on a school trip to Japan and decided to take up sumo. During those years, he competed in the Hakuhō Cup as a member of the Chinese delegation. In high school, he took part in a student exchange program and attended Hiryū High School. There, he finished third at the National School Championships team competition and reached the quarterfinals in the singles competition at the National Selection Tournament in Usa, Ōita. During those years, he was introduced to Arashio (the former Sōkokurai), who is also from Inner Mongolia and who was an acquaintance of his father and has known him since he was a child. This connection allowed him to train at Arashio stable for three years. He officially joined the heya ahead of the November 2021 tournament, after he obtained his work visa.

According to the Arashio stable website, he was given the shikona, or ring name, Daiseizan (大青山) to evoke the Yin Mountains, a mountain range near his hometown, and Mount Dàqìngshān, the highest peak in the range.

== Career ==
Daiseizan began his career at the March 2022 tournament, finishing with a strong 6–1 record. Promoted to the jonidan division, he once again finished the tournament with just one loss—suffered at the hands of Kotoeihō in the final match to determine the division champion. In the next tournament, in the sandanme division, Daiseizan faced Asanoyama on the final day; the former ōzeki defeated him in the final match, and Daiseizan once again missed out on the championship. Promoted to the top of the division for the September tournament, Daiseizan was, however, forced to withdraw from the competition after suffering a broken wrist during practice, causing him to lose two tournaments and subsequently dropping him in the rankings. Upon his return, Daiseizan rejoined the jonidan division and once again lost his final match to determine the division champion. Daiseizan steadily climbed the rankings, reaching the makushita division in time for the July tournament. In September, he qualified along with six other wrestlers for a playoff to determine the division champion. Daiseizan was eliminated in the first round by Kayō and missed out on the championship, but still posted a strong 6–1 record. At the July 2024 tournament, Daiseizan found himself in a position where he could potentially be promoted to the sekitori ranks. He won all his matches and clinched the first championship of his career.

When the promotions for the jūryō division were announced, it was revealed that Daiseizan would be promoted to the second-highest division. Daiseizan continued his career in that division for a year and a half. In December 2025, he announced his ambition to reach the makuuchi division in order to face two former Hiryū High School alumni, Atamifuji and Midorifuji. During the May 2026 tournament, Daiseizan found himself in a position to potentially be promoted to the top division. He finished the tournament with a 9–6 record, insisting that if he was not promoted, he would train hard because his senior stablemate, Wakatakakage, had won the top tournament that month. When the banzuke for the July tournament was released, it was announced that Daiseizan would indeed be promoted. This promotion makes him the first wrestler from his stable to reach the top division since Kōtokuzan was promoted for the March 2022 tournament, and the second Chinese wrestler in the sport's history to do so, following his own mentor in 2010.

== Career record ==
Daiseizan Daisuke
Year	January Hatsu basho, Tokyo	March Haru basho, Osaka	May Natsu basho, Tokyo	July Nagoya basho, Nagoya	September Aki basho, Tokyo	November Kyūshū basho, Fukuoka
2022	(Maezumō)	East Jonokuchi #11; 6–1	West Jonidan #42; 6–1	East Sandanme #67; 6–1	West Sandanme #10; Sat out due to injury 0–0–7	West Sandanme #70; Sat out due to injury 0–0–7
2023	West Jonidan #40; 6–1	East Sandanme #65; 6–1	East Sandanme #10; 4–3	East Makushita #59; 4–3	East Makushita #50; 6–1–P	West Makushita #21; 4–3
2024	West Makushita #18; 4–3	East Makushita #13; 6–1	West Makushita #3; 4–3	East Makushita #2; 7–0; Champion	East Jūryō #12; 7–8	East Jūryō #12; 9–6
2025	East Jūryō #9; 5–10	East Jūryō #10; 8–7	West Jūryō #6; 7–8	West Jūryō #6; 10–5	East Jūryō #1; 7–8	West Jūryō #3; 9–6
2026	East Jūryō #2; 7–8	East Jūryō #3; 8–7	West Jūryō #1; 9–6	East Maegashira #16; 6–9	East Jūryō #2; 8–7	East Maegashira #17; 3–12
Record given as wins–losses–absences Top division champion Top division runner-up Retired Non-participation Jūryō Lower divisions Sanshō key: F=Fighting spirit; O=Outstanding performance; T=Technique Also shown: ★=Kinboshi; P=Playoff(s); Divisions: Makuuchi — Jūryō — Makushita — Sandanme — Jonidan — Jonokuchi Makuuchi ranks: Yokozuna — Ōzeki — Sekiwake — Komusubi — Maegashira
