= Asasuiryū Ryōma =

Japanese sumo wrestler (born 2000)

Personal information
- Native name: 朝翠龍 涼馬
- Born: Ryōma Ishizaki; August 9, 2000 (age 26) Shijōnawate, Osaka Prefecture, Japan
- Height: 1.75 m (5 ft 9 in)
- Weight: 120 kg (260 lb; 19 st)

Sport
- Sport: Sumo
- Rank: see below
- University team: Nippon Sport Science University
- Heya: Takasago
- Debut: July 2024
- Highest rank: Maegashira 13 (November 2026)
- Updated on October 26, 2026

Asasuiryū Ryōma (Japanese: 朝翠龍 涼馬; born August 9, 2000 as Ryōma Ishizaki (石崎 涼馬, Ishizaki Ryōma)) is a Japanese professional sumo wrestler. Wrestling for Takasago stable, his highest rank is maegashira 13.

He is the younger brother of Asakōryū, a sumo wrestler from the same heya (sumo stable).

== Early life ==
Ishizaki began practicing sumo in elementary school at Kusunoki Elementary School in Shijōnawate. In his final year of elementary school, he placed third in the National Elementary School Sumo Championships. In junior and senior high school, he enrolled at Meitoku Gijuku High School in Susaki, Kōchi Prefecture. In his third year of junior high school, he qualified as one of the top eight wrestlers in the country at the National Junior High School Sumo Championships. After graduating, he enrolled in the Faculty of Sports and Culture at Nippon Sport Science University where he trained alongside future top wrestlers such as Ōnosato, Ōnokatsu and Kyokukaiyū. There, he won the individual competition in the under-115-kg weight class at the National Collegiate Sumo Championships in his freshman year. In his junior year, he won the individual competition in the under-135-kg weight class at the East Japan Collegiate Sumo Championships. In his senior year, he placed third at the All Japan Sumo Championships. This latest podium finish qualified him for makushita tsukedashi. After graduating, he worked for a time as a teacher in Nagahama, Shiga, competing in amateur corporate tournaments and winning the National Teachers Sumo Tournament. He also competed as part of the Japanese delegation at the World Combat Games, where he won a bronze medal in the heavyweight division.

After a period of tournament competition, he decided to become a professional sumo wrestler before his status as a tsukedashi expired, inspired by the success of his former college classmates. He also stated, "I told myself I had to make the most of my youth so I wouldn't have any regrets". In May 2024, it was announced that he would join Takasago stable, the heya where his older brother Asakōryū also wrestled. When he first started out, it was decided that he would compete under his legal name Ishizaki (石崎).

== Career ==
Ishizaki performed well in his first professional tournaments. He quickly rose to the top of the makushita rankings in January 2025 and went on a six-match winning streak before losing the championship match to Mudōhō. His 6–1 record was, however, enough to propel him to the top of the division, putting him in a position to potentially be promoted to the sekitori ranks. However, he had a poor tournament and posted the first negative record of his career. In July 2025, Ishizaki also found himself in a position to be promoted. Having posted a 6–1 record, his promotion to the jūryō division was made official at the end of the month. His promotion, which came at the same time as those of his stablemates Asahakuryū and Asanoyama, made Takasago the first stable in 46 years, since the September 1979 tournament, to have three of its wrestlers promoted to jūryō simultaneously. With his promotion, Ishizaki and his brother Asakōryū became the twenty-fourth pair of brothers to reach the sekitori ranks. Upon his promotion, he was given the shikona, or ring name, Asasuiryū (朝翠龍), which consists of the character for green or emerald (翠), drawing a comparison to a piece of jade that is polished and eventually shines as a result of hard work.

At the July 2026 tournament, Asasuiryū and three other wrestlers (Shōnannoumi, Toshinofuji and Arashifuji) were tied for the championship on the final day with a record of 11–4. In the ensuing playoff, Asasuiryū was eliminated by Shōnannoumi in the first round, losing the championship, which was won by Shōnannoumi.

When the banzuke for the September 2026 tournament was released, it was announced that Asasuiryū’s record would be sufficient to promote him to makuuchi. Because his brother, Asakōryū, was already in that same division, the two brothers became the fourteenth pair of brothers to compete simultaneously in the top division in the history of the sport. Asasuiryū posted a winning record in his first tournament in sumo's top division. He had four wins and seven losses after the eleventh day and won his last four bouts. He was ranked at maegashira 13 for the November 2026 tournament.

== Fighting style ==
Even during his time as a teacher, his sumo style was already characterized as a pushing-oriented style. The Japan Sumo Association lists oshi (pushing) as his preferred technique.

== Career record ==
Asasuiryū Ryōma
Year	January Hatsu basho, Tokyo	March Haru basho, Osaka	May Natsu basho, Tokyo	July Nagoya basho, Nagoya	September Aki basho, Tokyo	November Kyūshū basho, Fukuoka
2024	x	x	x	Makushita tsukedashi #60; 6–1	West Makushita #29; 4–3	East Makushita #22; 6–1
2025	West Makushita #8; 6–1	West Makushita #1; 3–4	East Makushita #4; 4–3	East Makushita #2; 6–1	West Jūryō #12; 7–8	West Jūryō #12; 9–6
2026	West Jūryō #7; 10–5	East Jūryō #2; 6–9	West Jūryō #4; 10–5	East Jūryō #1; 11–4–P	East Maegashira #15; 8–7	West Maegashira #13; 4–11
Record given as wins–losses–absences Top division champion Top division runner-up Retired Non-participation Jūryō Lower divisions Sanshō key: F=Fighting spirit; O=Outstanding performance; T=Technique Also shown: ★=Kinboshi; P=Playoff(s); Divisions: Makuuchi — Jūryō — Makushita — Sandanme — Jonidan — Jonokuchi Makuuchi ranks: Yokozuna — Ōzeki — Sekiwake — Komusubi — Maegashira

== See also ==
- Glossary of sumo terms
- List of active sumo wrestlers
