= Wakanoshō Eidō =

Japanese sumo wrestler (born 2003)

Personal information
- Native name: 若ノ勝 栄道
- Born: Shōichirō Takeda; August 22, 2003 (age 23) Utsunomiya, Tochigi Prefecture, Japan
- Height: 1.78 m (5 ft 10 in)
- Weight: 145 kg (320 lb; 22.8 st)

Sport
- Sport: Sumo
- Rank: see below
- Heya: Minatogawa
- Debut: January 2022
- Highest rank: Maegashira 11 (July 2026)
- Championships: 1 (Jūryō)
- Updated on June 29, 2026

Wakanoshō Eidō (Japanese: 若ノ勝 栄道; born August 22, 2003 as Shōichirō Takeda (竹田 章一郎, Takeda Shōichirō)) is a Japanese professional sumo wrestler. Wrestling for Minatogawa stable, including when it was still called Tokiwayama, his highest rank is maegashira.

== Early life ==
Takeda has a long history with martial arts, having started karate in kindergarten. In elementary school, he practiced judo and sumo, and began focusing exclusively on sumo starting in middle school. During those years, he placed third at the All-Japan Prefectural Middle School Sumo Championships and the All-Japan Middle School Sumo Championships. In his junior year, his club had the opportunity to visit Chiganoura stable, and after meeting Takakeishō, he became convinced to pursue a professional career. After graduating, he attended Saitama Sakae High School, a school renowned for its sumo program and Takakeishō’s alma mater. There, he placed in the top 16 at the National Sports Festival and at a substitute tournament held in place of the All-Japan High School Athletic Meet Sumo Competition, which was canceled that year due to the COVID-19 pandemic. During his high school years, Takeda was a classmate of the future Kotoeihō. Takeda joined Tokiwayama stable before formally graduating from high school. At the heya, he was diligently trained by Takakeishō.

== Career ==
At the start of his professional career, Takeda was given the shikona (ring name) Wakanoshō (若ノ勝) by combining the kanji for 'young' (若); taken from the ring name of the former yokozuna Wakanohana I, who had taught Tokiwayama (the former Takamisugi), the stablemaster of his stable, and the kanji for 'victory' (勝), which is also found in the names of his peers Takakeishō (貴景勝) and Takanoshō (隆の勝).

Wakanoshō worked his way through the lower divisions without ever winning a championship, though he steadily climbed the ranks. Later, he recalled his frustration at seeing wrestlers his age have much faster-paced careers, such as Hakunofuji and Kotoeihō. At the January 2025 tournament, he found himself in a position to potentially be promoted to the sekitori ranks. He finished the tournament with only two losses and secured promotion to the jūryō division. With this promotion, he becomes the fourth wrestler born in 2003 to be promoted to sekitori, following Hakunofuji, Aonishiki and Kotoeihō. He is also the 31st alumni of Saitama Sakae to have reached this rank.

However, Wakanoshō posted a losing record in his first tournament at this rank. Although he retained his rank, he was forced to withdraw from the May tournament on the third day due to an injury to his right Lisfranc ligament—his first absence since turning pro. This absence resulted in a demotion to the makushita division for the July tournament. However, he managed to climb back up the rankings, returning to the jūryō division for the November 2025 tournament. During the January tournament, he emerged as the leader of the competition, winning the championship on the final day of the tournament. Promoted to jūryō 3, Wakanoshō found himself in a position to potentially be promoted to the makuuchi division. He started the tournament among the tournament leaders, finishing with a record of 11–4. This result tied him with Dewanoryū, meaning the title would be decided in a playoff. Wakanoshō lost the match by yorikiri ('frontal force out'), missing out on a second consecutive championship.

Although he missed out on the championship, it was announced that his record would be enough to promote him to the makuuchi division for the May tournament, making him the first wrestler to be promoted to the top division since Minatogawa (the former Takakeishō) took over his heya. This promotion also makes him the first wrestler from Tochigi Prefecture to be promoted to makuuchi in seven years—the first since Takagenji for the July 2019 tournament. In his first tournament in the top division, Wakanoshō posted a winning record on Day 14. During the July tournament, Wakanoshō performed well, racking up five consecutive wins, but suffered a loss on the sixth day of the tournament, injuring his right knee in the process and having to be wheeled out of the ring in a wheelchair. The next day, it was confirmed that Wakanoshō was withdrawing from the tournament after suffering a contusion to his right femur. In August, it was announced that Wakanoshō had ruled out the possibility of undergoing surgery and was now focusing on rehabilitation with the goal of competing in the September tournament.

== Career record ==
Wakanoshō Eidō
Year	January Hatsu basho, Tokyo	March Haru basho, Osaka	May Natsu basho, Tokyo	July Nagoya basho, Nagoya	September Aki basho, Tokyo	November Kyūshū basho, Fukuoka
2022	(Maezumō)	West Jonokuchi #11; 6–1	East Jonidan #43; 6–1	West Sandanme #67; 5–2	East Sandanme #33; 6–1	East Makushita #51; 2–5
2023	East Sandanme #13; 6–1	West Makushita #37; 5–2	West Makushita #25; 3–4	West Makushita #35; 4–3	West Makushita #28; 4–3	West Makushita #22; 3–4
2024	West Makushita #27; 3–4	West Makushita #34; 5–2	East Makushita #20; 6–1	West Makushita #7; 3–4	West Makushita #12; 4–3	West Makushita #7; 6–1
2025	East Makushita #1; 5–2	West Jūryō #11; 7–8	West Jūryō #11; 1–2–12	West Makushita #6; 4–3	West Makushita #3; 5–2	West Jūryō #14; 8–7
2026	East Jūryō #11; 12–3; Champion	West Jūryō #3; 11–4–P	East Maegashira #16; 9–6	East Maegashira #11; 5–2–8	East Maegashira #16; Sat out due to injury 0–0–15	West Jūryō #10; 10–5
Record given as wins–losses–absences Top division champion Top division runner-up Retired Non-participation Jūryō Lower divisions Sanshō key: F=Fighting spirit; O=Outstanding performance; T=Technique Also shown: ★=Kinboshi; P=Playoff(s); Divisions: Makuuchi — Jūryō — Makushita — Sandanme — Jonidan — Jonokuchi Makuuchi ranks: Yokozuna — Ōzeki — Sekiwake — Komusubi — Maegashira

== See also ==
- Glossary of sumo terms
- List of active sumo wrestlers
- List of sumo second division champions
