= Fujiryōga Masaharu =

Japanese professional sumo wrestler

Personal information
- Native name: 藤凌駕 雅治
- Born: Masaharu Goshima; February 27, 2003 (age 23) Kasugai, Aichi, Japan
- Height: 1.80 m (5 ft 11 in)
- Weight: 184 kg (406 lb; 29.0 st)

Sport
- Sport: Sumo
- Rank: see below
- University team: Takushoku University
- Heya: Fujishima
- Debut: March 2025
- Highest rank: Maegashira 1 (November 2026)
- Championships: 1 (Jūryō)
- Gold Stars: 1 (Hōshōryū)
- Updated on November 10, 2026

Fujiryōga Masaharu (Japanese: 藤凌駕 雅治; born February 27, 2003 as Masaharu Goshima (五島 雅治, Goshima Masaharu)) is a Japanese professional sumo wrestler from Kasugai, Aichi. Wrestling for Fujishima stable, his highest rank is maegashira 1. He has one kinboshi, or gold star, for defeating a yokozuna-ranked opponent as a maegashira.

== Early life ==
Masaharu attended the Chukyo Club in fourth grade at Kasugai Municipal Hakusan Elementary School, and in the middle of his second year at Kasugai Municipal Ajimi Junior High School, he went to Wakayama Prefecture to study sumo and transferred to Arita Municipal Minoshima Junior High School. After graduating from junior high school, he went on to Wakayama Prefectural Minoshima High School, where in his third year he achieved results such as reaching the quarterfinals of the All Japan High School Sumo Championship.

After graduating from high school, he went on to attend Takushoku University, where he joined their sumo club. During his fourth year in 2024, he won the College Selection Tournament in Usa, Ōita, winning his first individual title. During his college years, he won no fewer than four national titles and ranked first in the student rankings for 2024. After placing third at the National Student Sumo Championship in November and the All Japan Sumo Championship in December, he decided to become a professional sumo wrestler after graduating from university. He received offers from several sumo stables, but decided that the sumo style he wanted to emulate was that of the former Musōyama, a former wrestler he admires, and joined Fujishima stable. He and Fujishima had been in touch since October 2024; the stablemaster having personally traveled to the Saga Sports Festival and the All Japan Sumo Championship to persuade Masaharu to join his stable.

== Early career ==
Based on his performance in 2024, Masaharu was given the approval to enter the tournament at the lowest rank of makushita via the tsukedashi system. He made his professional debut in the March 2025 tournament under his real name Goshima (五島).

Goshima went on to win four consecutive matches before suffering his first professional loss on the ninth day against Kawazoe. The defeat was his only loss of the tournament. Goshima continued to perform well until he was promoted to makushita 5 for the September tournament, a rank that put him in a position to potentially be promoted to the jūryō division. During the tournament, he posted a 6–1 record, earning him a promotion to the second-highest division for the November tournament. Upon his promotion, it was announced that he had changed his ring name to the shikona Fujiryōga (藤凌駕), combining the kanji for wisteria (藤), derived from the name of his stable, Fujishima (藤島), and the name Ryōga (凌駕), with a meaning of "to surpass others and rise even a little higher". This promotion made Fujiryōga the fifth wrestler from Wakayama Prefectural Minoshima High School to be promoted to the sekitori ranks, and the first since Tochimusashi for the September 2022 tournament.

In his first tournament in the jūryō division, Fujiryōga performed well, remaining undefeated in the first half of the tournament and winning all of his matches by oshidashi ('force out'). He later secured a two-win lead over his closest rivals in the title race on the eleventh day. He later won the championship with a 13–2 record. Fujiryōga entered the first tournament of 2026 ranked as jūryō 3, putting him in a position to potentially be promoted to the top division. On the ninth day, he earned his sixth victory against Tochitaikai, who had to be taken back on a wheelchair after the match. He finished the tournament with a record of 9–6. When the banzuke (rankings) for the March tournament was released, it was announced that Fujiryōga's record would be sufficient to promote him to the makuuchi division. This promotion made him the first wrestler from Aichi Prefecture to be newly promoted to makuuchi since Akiseyama in the March 2016 tournament. Notably, this promotion came at the same time as that of his stablemate Fujiseiun. This promotion made the two wrestlers the first pair of stablemates to be simultaneously promoted to the top division in 15 years–a first since Myōgiryū and Sadanoumi (Sakaigawa stable) for the November 2011 tournament.

== Makuuchi ==
In the March tournament, where he was ranked as maegashira 17, Fujiryōga finished with a 7–8 record. His ranking remained unchanged, despite his negative score, for the May tournament. During that tournament, Fujiryōga appeared for the first time with a full ōichōmage top-knot. After posting a winning record, Fujiryōga became the first wrestler from Aichi Prefecture to compete in the Nagoya tournament as a makuuchi wrestler since Tamaasuke, at the July 2013 tournament. Based on his performance, Fujiryōga was considered a potential recipient of the special prize for Fighting Spirit if he managed to secure an eleventh victory on the final day. However, he lost his match against Wakatakakage and finished the tournament with a record of 10–5, without winning any prizes.

Before the final day of the 2026 July tournament, it was announced that Fujiryōga could win his very first special prize for Fighting Spirit if he won his last match. Fujiryōga lost to Asakōryū and did not win the award.

On the third day of the November 2026 tournament, Fujiryōga earned the first kinboshi of his career by defeating yokozuna Hōshōryū.

== Fighting style ==
Fujiryōga's most common kimarite, or winning technique, is oshidashi ('frontal push out'). It was noted that he possessed excellent technique in pushing fighting.

== Personal life ==
Owed to the influence of his mother Carol, who is from the Philippines, Fujiryōga loves Filipino food, specifically chicken adobo. He is a fan of Disney movies since childhood and has been to Disneyland before.

== Career record ==
Fujiryōga Masaharu
Year	January Hatsu basho, Tokyo	March Haru basho, Osaka	May Natsu basho, Tokyo	July Nagoya basho, Nagoya	September Aki basho, Tokyo	November Kyūshū basho, Fukuoka
2025	x	Makushita tsukedashi #60; 6–1	East Makushita #28; 6–1	East Makushita #9; 4–3	West Makushita #5; 6–1	West Jūryō #13; 13–2; Champion
2026	East Jūryō #3; 9–6	East Maegashira #17; 7–8	East Maegashira #17; 10–5	East Maegashira #9; 10–5	West Maegashira #4; 8–7	West Maegashira #1; 9–6 ★
Record given as wins–losses–absences Top division champion Top division runner-up Retired Non-participation Jūryō Lower divisions Sanshō key: F=Fighting spirit; O=Outstanding performance; T=Technique Also shown: ★=Kinboshi; P=Playoff(s); Divisions: Makuuchi — Jūryō — Makushita — Sandanme — Jonidan — Jonokuchi Makuuchi ranks: Yokozuna — Ōzeki — Sekiwake — Komusubi — Maegashira

== See also ==
- Glossary of sumo terms
- List of active sumo wrestlers
- List of non-Japanese sumo wrestlers
- List of active gold star earners
- List of sumo second division champions
