= Asahakuryū Tarō =

Mongolian sumo wrestler (born 1999)

Personal information
- Native name: 朝白龍 太郎
- Born: Ragchaagyin Jamiyantogtokh; January 8, 1999 (age 27) Ulaanbaatar, Mongolia
- Height: 1.85 m (6 ft 1 in)
- Weight: 152 kg (335 lb; 23.9 st)

Sport
- Sport: Sumo
- Rank: see below
- University team: Takushoku University
- Heya: Takasago
- Debut: January 2023
- Highest rank: Maegashira 8 (May 2026)
- Championships: 1 (Juryo); 1 (Makushita); 1 (Jonokuchi)
- Updated on April 27, 2026

Asahakuryū Tarō (Japanese: 朝白龍 太郎; born 8 January 1999 as Ragchaagyin Jamiyantogtokh (Mongolian: Рагчаагийн Жамьяантогтох)) is a Mongolian professional sumo wrestler from Ulaanbaatar, Mongolia. He made his debut in the January 2023 tournament, wrestling for the Takasago stable.

== Early career ==
Jamiyantogtokh participated in basketball and shot put as a child, and began wrestling at age 13. However, after receiving an invitation from Dolgorsürengiin Dagvadorj (former yokozuna Asashōryū) and with the support of his family, he decided to switch to sumo. In 2014, he was selected along with Ōshōma, who transferred as a second-year student, and Hōshōryū at an audition for sports exchange students held in Mongolia by Kashiwa Nippon Sport Science University High School. The three of them moved to Japan in 2015. Since he hoped to become a professional sumo wrestler at the time of his arrival in Japan, he joined the sumo club from the beginning of his high school years. Ōshōma and Hōshōryū joined the wrestling club, so Jamintoktoho was the only one to join the sumo club immediately after enrolling. However, after Hōshōryū transferred to the sumo club midway through his first year, the teams competed for the foreign player slots in official matches, limiting his opportunities to compete in tournaments.

After graduating from high school, he hoped to enter the professional sumo world, but because there were no stables available at the time, he enrolled at Takushoku University in their Department of International Studies, the alma mater of the president of the Chiba Prefecture Sumo Federation. During his university years, he was a regular player from his first year, and achieved success by reaching the quarterfinals of the National Student Sumo Individual Weight Class Championship in his third year and the top 16 of the National Student Sumo Championship in his fourth year.

== Career ==
After graduating from university in 2022, he entered Takasago stable. Since he was already 23 years old at the time of his entry, he was eligible for the relaxed age limit for the new apprentice examinations. In the January 2023 tournament, he made his debut under the shikona Asahakuryū. The following March, he won all seven of his bouts in the jonokuchi division, becoming the champion. This marked his first career victory, as he had never won a championship as an amateur. In the May tournament, he was promoted to the jonidan division, losing to Oshoryu on the ninth day, his first loss since joining the stable. The following July tournament, he earned promotion to the sandanme division and won all seven of his bouts, but lost to Wakaikari in the deciding match. In the September tournament, he lost his sixth bout against Ōshōumi on day 11, but won his seventh bout against Chiyoarashi, who was undefeated and had an unbeaten record, on the 13th day, and advanced to the seven-man championship match with a record of 6 wins and 1 loss. He lost to Kitadaichi in the first round of the championship match. In the following November tournament, he ended up with a losing record for the first time since his debut.

From the May 2024 tournament onwards, he was ranked within the top 15 of the makushita division. After the September 2024 tournament, he tore the posterior cruciate ligament in his left knee during practice. He continued to compete without surgery, but his performance was lackluster, resulting in two consecutive losing tournaments. However, in the March 2025 tournament, he achieved his first winning record since his injury. In the July tournament, he rose to East Makushita 3, a new personal best, and won all seven of his matches, achieving his first victory in each division since the jonokuchi division and securing promotion to the juryo division.

=== Juryo promotion ===
At the ranking meeting held after the July 2025 tournament, it was officially announced that he was promoted to the juryo division for the following September tournament. At the same time, Asasuiryū was promoted to juryo with Asanoyama making his return to the juryo division. This marked the first time three wrestlers from the same stable had been promoted to juryo simultaneously in 46 years, since the autumn tournament of 1979, when Kotonoryu and Kotochitose were promoted to juryo with Kototateyama also returning to juryo at Sadogatake stable. It was also the first time that three wrestlers from the same stable had been promoted to juryo simultaneously since Ōnosato and Shirokuma at Nishonoseki stable. In the September tournament, he won the juryo division title, with a record of 13 wins and 2 losses. In the following November tournament, he was promoted to the 2nd rank in the west juryo division, with a record of 10 wins and 5 losses.

=== Makuuchi promotion ===
In the January 2026 tournament, he made his debut as the 17th ranked rikishi in the east maegashira division. This marked the first time a wrestler from Takushoku University had made his makuuchi division debut in 29 years, since Tochinonada in the May 1997 tournament.

== Personal life ==
Asahakuryū's father was a sekiwake in the Mongolian sumo competition. In 1977, his maternal uncle was selected to study at Meitoku Gijuku High School in Japan, along with Asashōryū, but he declined the offer. His uncle was then promoted to the rank of Takasago VIII.

Akiyoshi Nagai, head of the Kashiwa Junior Sumo Club, who coached Jamiyantogtokh during his high school years, said he had a "calm, gentle, and quiet" personality at the time. His shikona Asahakuryū comes from his master, Asasekiryū's active name and the auspicious character for "white".

== Career record ==
Asahakuryū Tarō
Year	January Hatsu basho, Tokyo	March Haru basho, Osaka	May Natsu basho, Tokyo	July Nagoya basho, Nagoya	September Aki basho, Tokyo	November Kyūshū basho, Fukuoka
2023	(Maezumō)	West Jonokuchi #11; 7–0; Champion	West Jonidan #13; 6–1	East Sandanme #44; 7–0–P	West Makushita #27; 6–1–P	West Makushita #11; 3–4
2024	East Makushita #19; 3–4	East Makushita #27; 6–1	West Makushita #10; 4–3	East Makushita #7; 3–4	East Makushita #12; 5–2	West Makushita #5; 3–4
2025	East Makushita #9; 3–4	West Makushita #15; 5–2	West Makushita #8; 5–2	East Makushita #3; 7–0; Champion	West Jūryō #11; 13–2; Champion	West Jūryō #2; 10–5
2026	East Maegashira #17; 8–7	East Maegashira #16; 10–5	West Maegashira #8; 5–10	East Maegashira #12; 7–8	West Maegashira #12; 8–7	West Maegashira #11; 11–4
Record given as wins–losses–absences Top division champion Top division runner-up Retired Non-participation Jūryō Lower divisions Sanshō key: F=Fighting spirit; O=Outstanding performance; T=Technique Also shown: ★=Kinboshi; P=Playoff(s); Divisions: Makuuchi — Jūryō — Makushita — Sandanme — Jonidan — Jonokuchi Makuuchi ranks: Yokozuna — Ōzeki — Sekiwake — Komusubi — Maegashira

== See also ==
- Glossary of sumo terms
- List of active sumo wrestlers
- List of Mongolian sumo wrestlers
- List of non-Japanese sumo wrestlers
- List of sumo second division champions
