= Toshinofuji Taisei =

Mongolian sumo wrestler (born 2000)

Personal information
- Native name: 寿之富士 大聖
- Born: Usukhbayar Demidjamts; August 24, 2000 (age 26) Ulaanbaatar, Mongolia
- Height: 1.95 m (6 ft 5 in)
- Weight: 156 kg (344 lb; 24.6 st)

Sport
- Sport: Sumo
- Rank: see below
- University team: Doshisha University
- Heya: Miyagino → Isegahama
- Debut: July 2024
- Highest rank: Maegashira 13 (November 2026)
- Championships: 1 (Jonidan)
- Updated on October 26, 2026

Toshinofuji Taisei (Japanese: 寿之富士 大聖; born August 24, 2000, as Usukhbayar Demidjamts (Mongolian: Өсөхбаярын Дэмиджамц) is a Mongolian professional sumo wrestler. Currently wrestling for Isegahama stable, he started his career at Miyagino stable in 2024. His highest rank is maegashira 13.

== Early life ==
Usukhbayar was born in Ulaanbaatar into a family of wrestlers. His great-grandfather was a champion and his father, Gelegjamtsyn Ösökhbayar, is himself one of the great names in bökh, having achieved the rank of State Grand Champion (Mongolian: Улсын дархан аварга)—meaning he has won a wrestling tournament four times at a national Naadam festival. As a child, he played basketball. At the urging of yokozuna Hakuhō, Usukhbayar decided to complete his high school education in Japan, enrolling at Tottori Jōhoku High School. At that time, Hakuhō had close ties with his family, as Usukhbayar's great-grandfather had taught Mongolian wrestling to his father, Jigjidiin Mönkhbat. After that, Jigjidiin, in turn, coached Gelegjamtsyn. With no prior experience in sumo, he said he came to love the sport while in high school. After graduating, he immediately sought to join a heya to become a professional sumo wrestler, but was unsuccessful. He therefore enrolled at Doshisha University to study theology, studying on Christianity, Islam, and Buddhism, among other subjects. On this subject, he stated: "Religion can soothe the mind. What I have learned is also applicable to sumo". During his college years, he won the individual title at the Kanazawa All-Japan University Selection Tournament—which featured 16 universities selected from across the country—and placed third in the individual competition at the West Japan Collegiate Sumo Championships. While he was in college, he had the opportunity to train at Kansai University, where he faced future Aonishiki, though he was unable to defeat him even once. In January 2023, Hakuhō retired and held a retirement ceremony at the Ryōgoku Kokugikan in Tokyo. In an unusual move, Usukhbayar was selected along with two other Mongolians (Hakuhō's son and nephew) to participate in a practice bout dubbed Hakuhō's "final match" (最後の取組).

== Career ==
After graduating, Usukhbayar joined Miyagino stable, where Hakuhō acted as stablemaster. When he made his debut, Usukhbayar was given the shikona, or ring name, Seihakuhō (聖白鵬), because his name means "sacred sea" in Mongolian and he wanted to include the concept of sacredness in his ring name. After several suggestions, his coach decided to simply combine his own ring name with the character for "sacred" (聖). However, it was confirmed at the end of March 2024 that Seihakuhō, and all the wrestlers and coaches from Miyagino stable, would be transferred to Isegahama stable for an indefinite period of time following the abuse case and the retirement of then-Miyagino's top ranker, Hokuseihō.

In his first match in the jonokuchi division, Seihakuhō advanced to a playoff with a 6–1 record to contend for the championship. However, he was defeated and did not win the championship. In the next tournament, he won with a perfect 7–0 record to claim the jonidan championship. In June 2025, it was confirmed in a Japan Sumo Association press release that Miyagino (the former Hakuhō) would be retiring, effectively closing Miyagino stable and maintaining custody of staff from Miyagino stable to Isegahama stable. Subsequently, in December 2025, it was announced that a number of wrestlers, including Seihakuhō, had changed their ring names to adopt the Isegahama naming traditions. Seihakuhō was given the shikona Toshinofuji (寿之富士). Regarding his new name, it was revealed that the kanji for sacred (聖) was supposed to be reused and combined with the part referring to Mount Fuji (富士) in his new name, but that this was impossible because another wrestler was already named Seifuji.

At the January 2026 tournament, Toshinofuji performed well, posting a 5–2 record and securing a promotion to the sekitori ranks by being promoted to the jūryō division. After steadily climbing the ranks, Toshinofuji found himself among the top contenders for the championship at the July 2026 tournament, neck and neck with his stablemate Arashifuji. With an 11–4 record heading into the final day of the tournament, he qualified for a playoff to determine the champion (along with Shōnannoumi, Asasuiryū and Arashifuji). Toshinofuji won his first match against Arashifuji before losing to Shōnannoumi, who went on to win the championship.

When the banzuke for the September 2026 tournament was released, it was announced that Toshinofuji's performance would be sufficient for him to be promoted to the top makuuchi division. Upon his promotion, he mentioned that within his stable—which at the time had nine active sekitori—he received particular encouragement from stablemates Atamifuji, Hakunofuji, and Arashifuji.

== Fighting style ==
Toshinofuji 's most common kimarite, or winning technique, is yori-kiri ('force out'), and he prefers a migi-yotsu, or left hand outside, right hand inside grip on his opponent's mawashi.

== Career record ==
Toshinofuji Taisei
| Year | January Hatsu basho, Tokyo | March Haru basho, Osaka | May Natsu basho, Tokyo | July Nagoya basho, Nagoya | September Aki basho, Tokyo | November Kyūshū basho, Fukuoka |
|---|---|---|---|---|---|---|
| 2024 | x | (Maezumō) | West Jonokuchi #3; 6–1–P | East Jonidan #25; 7–0; Champion | West Sandanme #28; 6–1 | East Makushita #47; 5–2 |
| 2025 | East Makushita #28; 2–5 | East Makushita #45; 5–2 | West Makushita #28; 4–3 | East Makushita #21; 5–2 | East Makushita #10; 5–2 | West Makushita #5; 4–3 |
| 2026 | West Makushita #2; 5–2 | West Jūryō #11; 10–5 | West Jūryō #7; 9–6 | West Jūryō #4; 11–4–PP | West Maegashira #16; 9–6 | East Maegashira #13; 8–7 |
Record given as wins–losses–absences Top division champion Top division runner-up Retired Non-participation Jūryō Lower divisions Sanshō key: F=Fighting spirit; O=Outstanding performance; T=Technique Also shown: ★=Kinboshi; P=Playoff(s); Divisions: Makuuchi — Jūryō — Makushita — Sandanme — Jonidan — Jonokuchi Makuuchi ranks: Yokozuna — Ōzeki — Sekiwake — Komusubi — Maegashira

== See also ==
- Glossary of sumo terms
- List of active sumo wrestlers
- List of Mongolian sumo wrestlers
- List of non-Japanese sumo wrestlers
