= Fujiseiun Tatsuki =

Japanese professional sumo wrestler

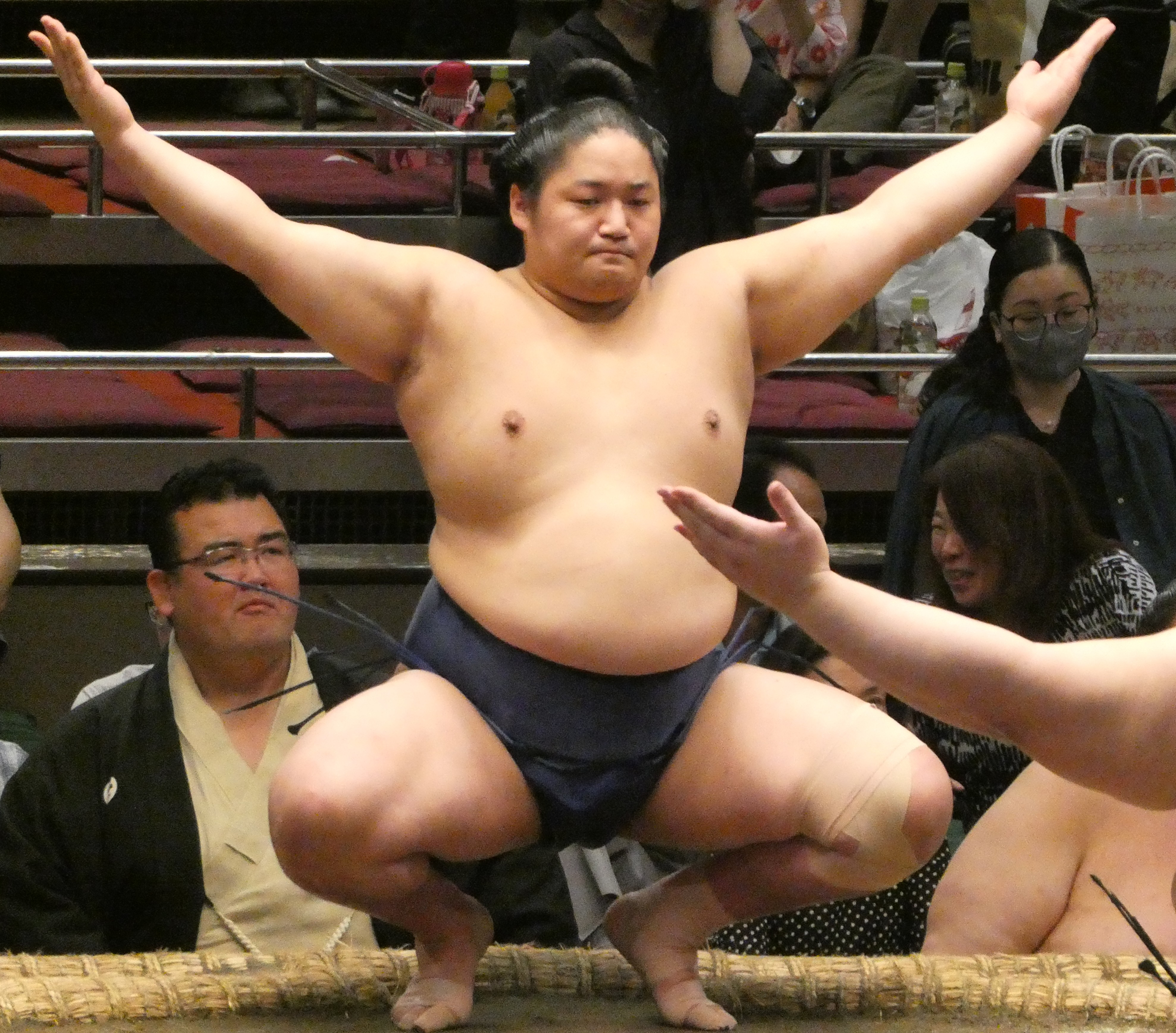
- Fujiseiun in September 2024

Personal information
- Native name: 藤青雲 龍輝
- Born: Tatsuki Higashi; December 5, 1997 (age 28) Kumamoto, Kumamoto Prefecture, Japan
- Height: 1.85 m (6 ft 1 in)
- Weight: 149 kg (328 lb; 23.5 st)

Sport
- Sport: Sumo
- Rank: see below
- University team: Meiji University
- Heya: Fujishima
- Debut: March 2021
- Highest rank: Maegashira 2 (November 2026)
- Championships: 1 (Makushita); 2 (Sandanme); 1 (Jonokuchi)
- Special Prizes: 1 (Fighting Spirit)
- Gold Stars: 1 (Hōshōryū)
- Updated on November 12, 2026

Fujiseiun Tatsuki (Japanese: 藤青雲 龍輝; born December 5, 1997 as Tatsuki Higashi (東 龍輝, Higashi Tatsuki)) is a Japanese professional sumo wrestler from Kumamoto. Wrestling for Fujishima stable, his highest rank is maegashira 2. He has one kinboshi, or gold star, for defeating a yokozuna-ranked opponent as a maegashira.

== Early life ==
Higashi is one of five siblings, with three younger brothers and one older sister. His parents are farmers and own an orchard where they grow mandarins. Higashi began practicing sumo in elementary school, while attending elementary school. Between fourth and sixth grade, however, he stopped to focus on baseball. When he started middle school, he joined the judo club. In high school, he enrolled at Buntoku High School before going on to Meiji University, where he once again joined the sumo club. During his college years, he ranked among the top 32 wrestlers in Japan at the National Sports Festival sumo competition. In his third year, he reached the quarterfinals of the National Student Sumo Championship in the under-135-kg weight class. In his fourth year, he reached the round of 16 in the College Selection Tournament in Usa, Ōita, as well as the round of 32 in the National Sports Festival. After graduating in 2020, he joined Toppan for a short time. Although he had initially planned to compete in corporate tournaments, the COVID-19 pandemic led to the cancellation of all events, including practice sessions. Higashi then decided to turn professional. Thanks to his connections with Yamawake (the former maegashira Buyūzan), a Meiji University alumnus, he was recruited to Fujishima stable. Higashi was given the shikona (ring name) Fujiseiun (藤青雲), a name inspired by the expression Seiun no Kokorozashi (青雲の志), which means "having the ambition to achieve glory and success".

== Early career ==
Fujiseiun made his debut at the March 2021 tournament, which was, however, marked by the cancellation of matches for new recruits as part of COVID-19 safety measures. As a one-time exception, the Japan Sumo Association ruled during that tournament that all maezumo would be eligible to compete in the jonokuchi division starting with the May tournament. Unable to compete, Fujisieun and the other new recruits held their introduction ceremony during the May tournament—an extraordinary decision.

During the jonokuchi competition, he and his stablemate Suguro (the future Fujitoshi) had a perfect tournament, racking up seven consecutive victories, with the championship ultimately decided in a playoff. Fujiseiun won the match by oshitaoshi (frontal push down). At the next tournament, in July, Fujiseiun also won all of his jonidan matches, advancing to a playoff against Osanai, which he lost by makiotoshi (twist down). In September, he continued his streak of perfect tournament performances by winning the sandanme championship and racking up 21 consecutive victories in official competition. Fujiseiun spent more than a year in the makushita division without particularly standing out until the March 2023 tournament, when his barely positive record as makushita #2 earned him a promotion to the jūryō division. This promotion made Fujiseiun the first Meiji University alumnus to reach sekitori status in 23 years, the first since Buyūzan, his coach at Fujishima stable. Fujiseiun's career in the jūryō division was limited to a single tournament, in which he posted a 9–6 record at the July tournament. In September, he was forced to withdraw from all competition following an injury sustained during practice on June 16. Diagnosed with a torn anterior cruciate ligament in his left knee, Fujiseiun underwent surgery that sidelined him for the remainder of the year, resulting in a significant drop in the rankings.

When the season resumed in January, Fujiseiun had been relegated to the sandanme division, where he went on to win the championship. After the March tournament, Fujiseiun entered the May tournament with a chance to regain his former status. During the tournament, he won all of his bouts, securing his return to the jūryō division for July. After competing in nine tournaments in this division, Fujiseiun reached the top rank in the division for the January 2026 tournament. He had a very strong showing in that tournament, posting a 11–4 record. On that occasion, it was announced that he would be promoted to makuuchi, the highest division of professional sumo, for the March tournament. Notably, this promotion came at the same time as that of his stablemate Fujiryōga. This promotion made the two wrestlers the first pair of stablemates to be simultaneously promoted to the top division in 15 years–a first since Myōgiryū and Sadanoumi (Sakaigawa stable) for the November 2011 tournament. Fujiseiun is also the sixth sumo wrestler from Meiji University to reach the maegashira rank.

== Makuuchi ==
In his inaugural tournament in the division, Fujiseiun won 10 matches, qualifying him to receive the special prize for Fighting Spirit.

On the fifth day of the November 2026 tournament, Fujiseiun stood out when he earned his first kinboshi by defeating yokozuna Hōshōryū.

== Fighting style ==
Fujiseiun's most common kimarite, or winning technique, is yorikiri ('force out'), and he prefers a migi-yotsu, or left hand outside, right hand inside grip on his opponent's mawashi. However, it was noted that he possessed excellent technique in pushing fighting.

== Career record ==
Fujiseiun Tatsuki
Year	January Hatsu basho, Tokyo	March Haru basho, Osaka	May Natsu basho, Tokyo	July Nagoya basho, Nagoya	September Aki basho, Tokyo	November Kyūshū basho, Fukuoka
2021	x	(Maezumō)	East Jonokuchi #27; 7–0–P; Champion	East Jonidan #15; 7–0–P	East Sandanme #21; 7–0; Champion	West Makushita #17; 3–4
2022	East Makushita #24; 6–1	West Makushita #8; 3–4	East Makushita #11; 4–3	East Makushita #8; 5–2	East Makushita #5; 4–3	West Makushita #2; 3–4
2023	West Makushita #5; 5–2	East Makushita #2; 4–3	East Jūryō #13; 9–6	East Jūryō #6; Sat out due to injury 0–0–15	East Makushita #5; Sat out due to injury 0–0–7	East Makushita #46; Sat out due to injury 0–0–7
2024	West Sandanme #26; 7–0; Champion	West Makushita #14; 4–3	East Makushita #11; 7–0; Champion	East Jūryō #14; 9–6	West Jūryō #10; 7–8	West Jūryō #10; 9–6
2025	East Jūryō #8; 8–7	West Jūryō #5; 9–6	West Jūryō #2; 4–11	West Jūryō #8; 9–6	West Jūryō #5; 10–5	West Jūryō #1; 8–7
2026	West Jūryō #1; 11–4	West Maegashira #13; 10–5; F	West Maegashira #6; 7–8	West Maegashira #6; 7–8	East Maegashira #7; 9–6	West Maegashira #2; 7–8 ★
Record given as wins–losses–absences Top division champion Top division runner-up Retired Non-participation Jūryō Lower divisions Sanshō key: F=Fighting spirit; O=Outstanding performance; T=Technique Also shown: ★=Kinboshi; P=Playoff(s); Divisions: Makuuchi — Jūryō — Makushita — Sandanme — Jonidan — Jonokuchi Makuuchi ranks: Yokozuna — Ōzeki — Sekiwake — Komusubi — Maegashira

== See also ==
- Glossary of sumo terms
- List of active sumo wrestlers
- List of active gold star earners
- List of active special prize winners
- List of sumo record holders
