= Arashifuji Kanato =

Japanese professional sumo wrestler (born 2004)

Personal information
- Native name: 嵐富士 奏凪人
- Born: Kanato Matsui; 12 October 2004 (age 22) Umi, Fukuoka, Japan
- Height: 1.72 m (5 ft 7 1/2 in)
- Weight: 123 kg (271 lb; 19.4 st)

Sport
- Sport: Sumo
- Rank: See below
- Heya: Miyagino → Isegahama
- Debut: March 2024
- Highest rank: Maegashira 16 (November 2026)
- Updated on October 26, 2026

Arashifuji Kanato (Japanese: 嵐富士 奏凪人; born 12 October 2004 as Kanato Matsui (松井 奏凪人, Matsui Kanato)) is a Japanese professional sumo wrestler from Fukuoka, Japan. He is a member of Isegahama stable. He made his debut in March 2024 and reached the second-highest jūryō division in July 2026.

== Early life and sumo background ==
Matsui is from Umi, Fukuoka. His first major public appearance was during his junior high years; he appeared on the December 2018 season of obstacle course TV show, Sasuke (also known as "Ninja Warrior"). He attended Tottori Jōhoku High School where he trained in sumo with future stablemate Hakunofuji. During his time there, he participated in the Inter-High School Sumo Championship; his team won the championship, and he finished second place in the individual rankings. He stayed for one year after graduation working as a sumo coach. During his time as a coach he also wrestled for the corporate sumo team of Noda-gumi Co., Ltd. (株式会社野田組), a metal-working company represented by the father of his former classmate and future stablemate Hakunofuji. He competed in the National Sports Festival of Japan in October 2023, scoring among the top 8 adults and qualifying himself for makushita tsukedashi.

== Career ==
Matsui joined Miyagino stable (headed by the 69th yokozuna Hakuhō) in February 2024, joining fellow Tottori Jōhoku High School graduates Hakunofuji, Hokuseihō, and Ishiura. He adopted his family name, Matsui, as his ring name. He made his professional debut at the March 2024 tournament ranked at the bottom of the third-highest makushita division. He was the first wrestler to receive this placement since the rules for makushita tsukedashi were revised in September 2023. For much of his career in makushita, he served as an attendant for Yoshinofuji. He steadily climbed the ranks, posting twelve winning records over fourteen tournaments in makushita to earn promotion to the jūryō division.

Shortly after Matsui's debut tournament, Miyagino stable was closed due to an abuse scandal. All wrestlers at Miyagino were transferred to Isegahama stable. He continued to receive coaching from Hakuhō at Isegahama stable until Hakuhō's departure from the Japan Sumo Association in June 2025. Matsui's ring name was changed to Arashifuji (嵐富士) for the January 2026 tournament. The change coincided with 7 other former Miyagino stable wrestlers who all adopted new ring names to include the fuji (富士) characters customary among Isegahama wrestlers. The first character, arashi (嵐), means 'storm'. Head coach Isegahama (former 73rd yokozuna Terunofuji) indicated that the new name reflects a hope that Arashifuji will "stir up a storm in the ring".

Arashifuji made his sekitori debut in the 2026 Nagoya Basho at the rank of jūryō 13 east, bringing the total number of sekitori from Isegahama stable to 9. He opened the tournament with seven straight wins before losing on day 8 to Nishinoryu by isamiashi (accidental step-out). Arashifuji went on to win the next three matches, entering day 12 as the sole leader with a 10–1 record. Ultimately, he placed runner-up with an 11–4–P record after a 4-way playoff, facing and losing to stablemate Toshinofuji who himself lost to jūryō champion Shōnannoumi.

== Career record ==
Arashifuji Kanato
Year	January Hatsu basho, Tokyo	March Haru basho, Osaka	May Natsu basho, Tokyo	July Nagoya basho, Nagoya	September Aki basho, Tokyo	November Kyūshū basho, Fukuoka
2024	x	Makushita tsukedashi #60; 5–2	East Makushita #41; 4–2–1	West Makushita #31; 4–3	West Makushita #23; 4–3	East Makushita #17; 5–2
2025	East Makushita #8; 2–5	East Makushita #25; 4–3	West Makushita #19; 4–3	East Makushita #14; 4–3	East Makushita #9; 3–4	West Makushita #11; 4–3
2026	West Makushita #9; 4–3	East Makushita #7; 5–2	East Makushita #2; 5–2	East Jūryō #13; 11–4–P	West Jūryō #5; 10–5	East Maegashira #16; 7–8
Record given as wins–losses–absences Top division champion Top division runner-up Retired Non-participation Jūryō Lower divisions Sanshō key: F=Fighting spirit; O=Outstanding performance; T=Technique Also shown: ★=Kinboshi; P=Playoff(s); Divisions: Makuuchi — Jūryō — Makushita — Sandanme — Jonidan — Jonokuchi Makuuchi ranks: Yokozuna — Ōzeki — Sekiwake — Komusubi — Maegashira

== See also ==
- Glossary of sumo terms
- List of active sumo wrestlers
