= 2026 Chiba flood =

Natural disaster in Japan

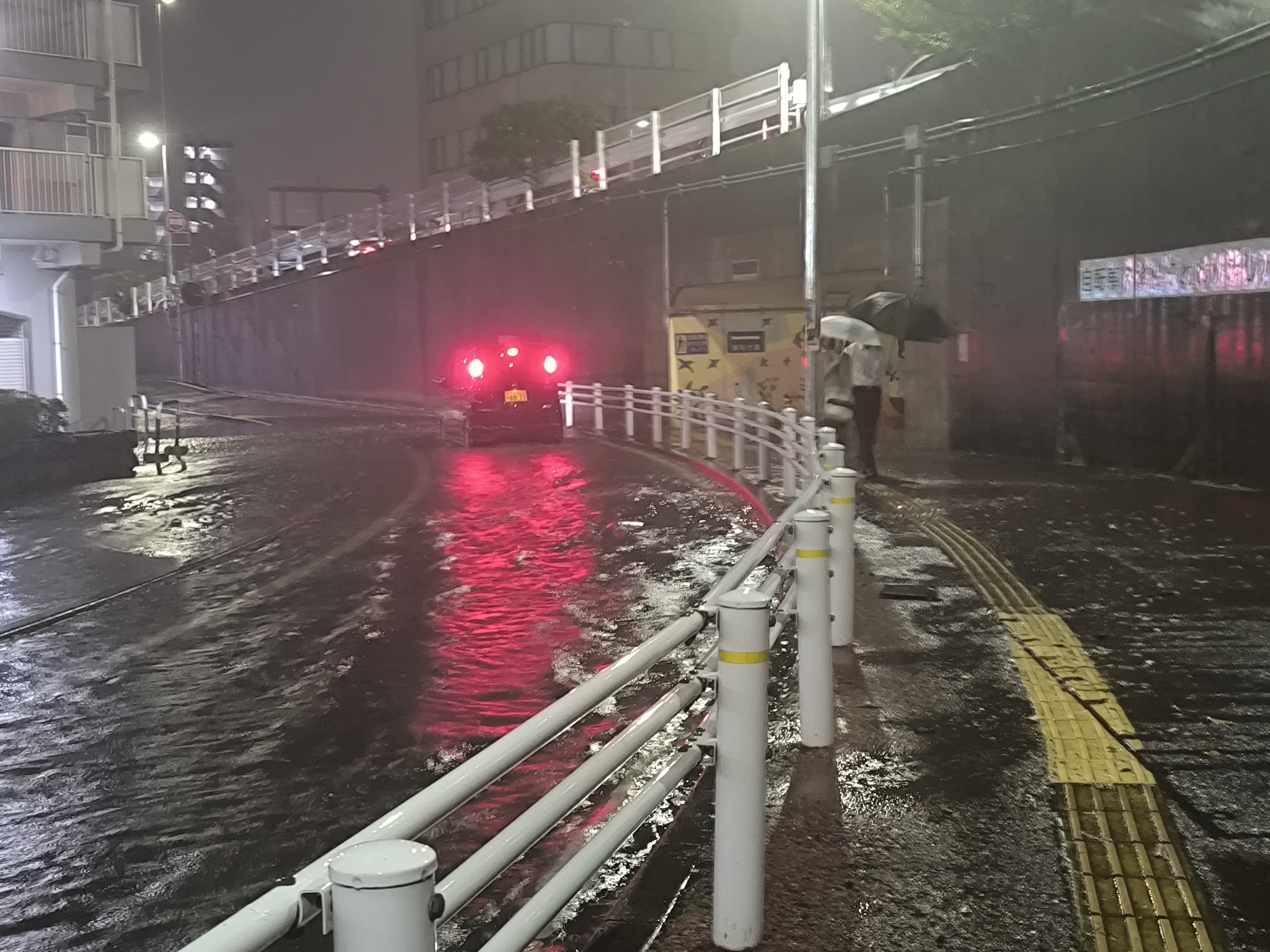
- Heavy rain in August 2026, Chiba City
- Date: August 13–14, 2026
- Duration: 1 day
- Location: Chiba Prefecture
- Cause: Record torrential rainfall
- Deaths: At least 13
- Injuries: At least 30

On August 13, 2026, heavy rainfall from a prolonged rainband occurred across the Kantō region of Japan. The precipitation was focused mainly in Chiba prefecture, causing widespread flooding, landslides and at least 13 deaths and 30 injuries reported as of 18 August 2026. The event was officially designated the August 2026 Chiba Heavy Rains (令和8年8月千葉豪雨) on August 14, 2026, by the Japan Meteorological Agency.

== Weather conditions ==
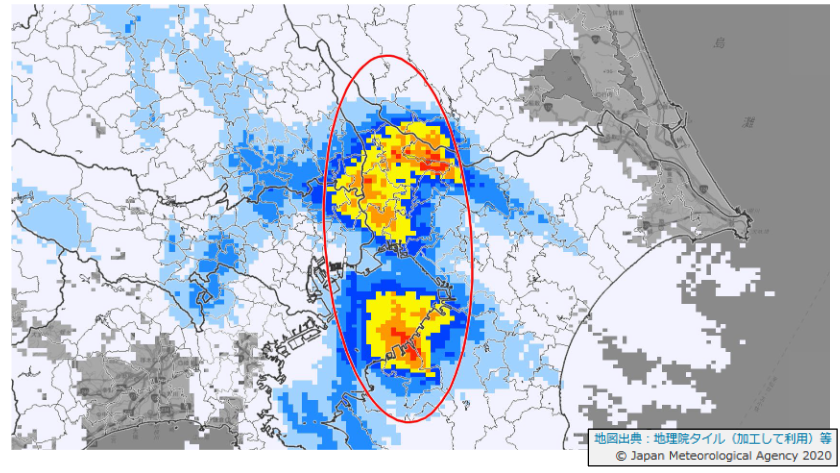
August 13, 2026 17:50 3-hour precipitation

A Level 5 warning was issued by the Japan Meteorological Agency to over 22 cities and towns, indicating a life-threatening situation. A level 5 warning had never been issued in Chiba prefecture. This was subsequently downgraded to a level 4 warning on 14 August. A total of 115 mm of rain in one hour was reported in Chiba city on 13 August with 351 mm recorded at Chiba Station in 24 hours. It was the wettest August in 60 years.

== Impact ==
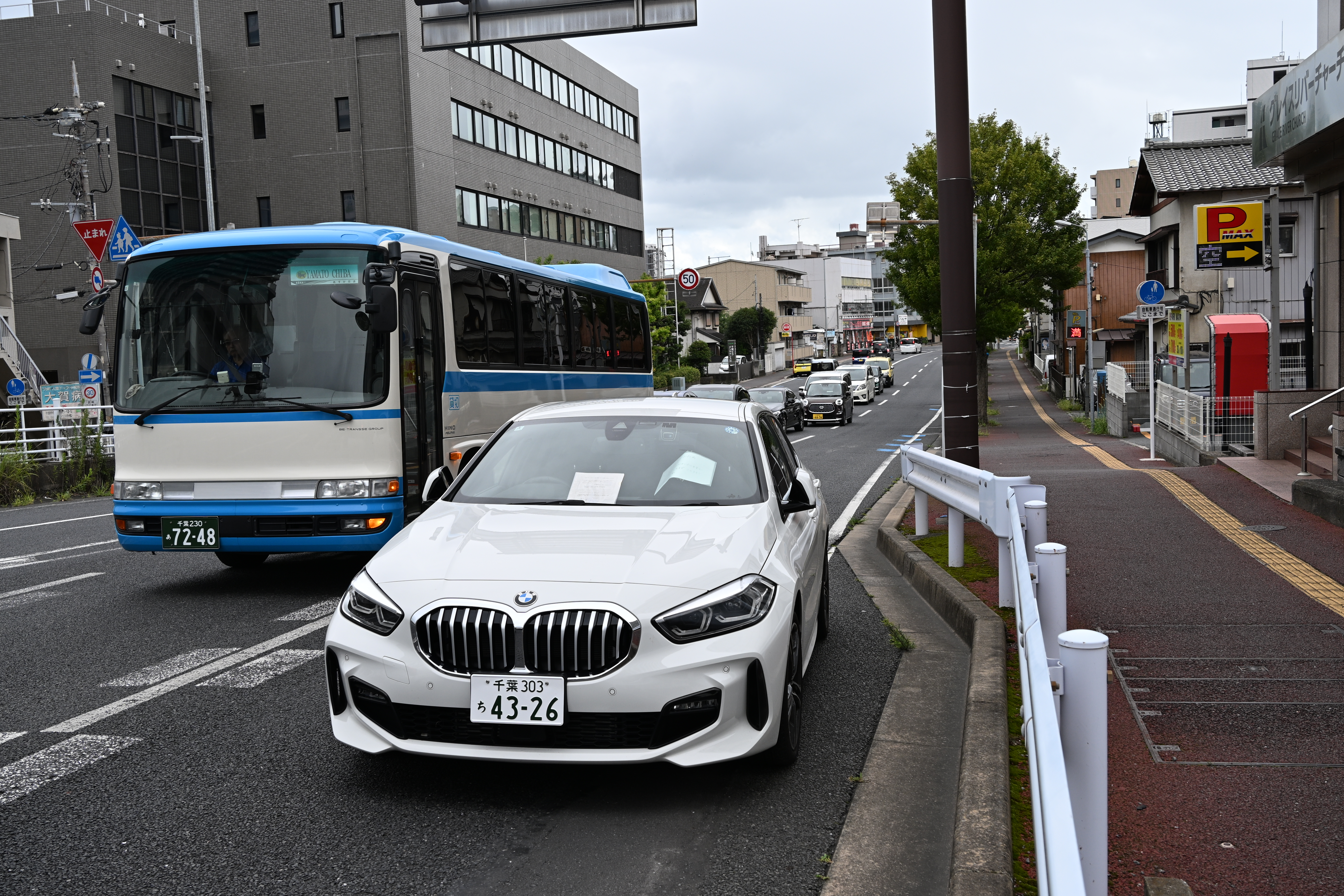
A passenger car stranded and abandoned on National Route 126

At least 400,000 people were ordered to evacuate. Initial disruption to both rail and flight transport was reported on Thursday, with 7,000 stranded at Narita airport and hundreds at Chiba station. Flights resumed from Narita airport on Friday, with partial rail resuming also. However, rail service disruption continued into Friday, with suspension on the JR Keiyo, Kururi, and Uchibō lines.

Electricity outages were seen in Chiba due to flooding at Soga substation, with outages lasting until the morning of the 15th August. Over 68,000 homes were left without power.

Over 70 homes were partially destroyed and over 1,000 were flooded during the flooding. 3 properties collapsed.

Around 2,500 cars were abandoned during the events, with many requiring recovery. 600 vehicles were still left requiring recovery on 18th August. The local government launched a project alongside central government to remove the remaining vehicles; however, they noted identifying car owners was challenging. Many car owners were left to deal with repair costs themselves, having not taken out physical damage insurance.

The rains and subsequent flooding were responsible for at least 13 deaths in Chiba prefecture, more than the 12 reported deaths following Typhoon Hagibis in October 2019. Of the 13 people reported dead across Chiba in August 2019, three were found in submerged vehicles.

Operations were cancelled at Chiba University Hospital due to damage; as of 17 August, they were unable to clean and sterilise surgical instruments due to flooding in the hospital basement. There was a possibility of a radioactive waste leak from the National Institutes for Quantum Science and Technology, however this posed no environmental risk.

== Response ==
Shelters were set up at both Narita airport and the Chiba prefectural government building, with over 200 evacuation centres set up in total. The Japanese Army was called in to help evacuate at least 4,000 stranded people.

Volunteers helped to clear flooded homes, with efforts continuing on 18th August.

In October 2026, the Japan Sumo Association announced a donation of 10 million yen to support reconstruction efforts in the prefecture, with a portion of the funds having been raised through public donations during the September sumo tournament in Tokyo.

== Cause ==
The cause of the flooding was the large volume of rainfall, which overwhelmed the Chiba city sewage system.
