= Asakōryū Takuma =

Japanese Sumo Wrestler

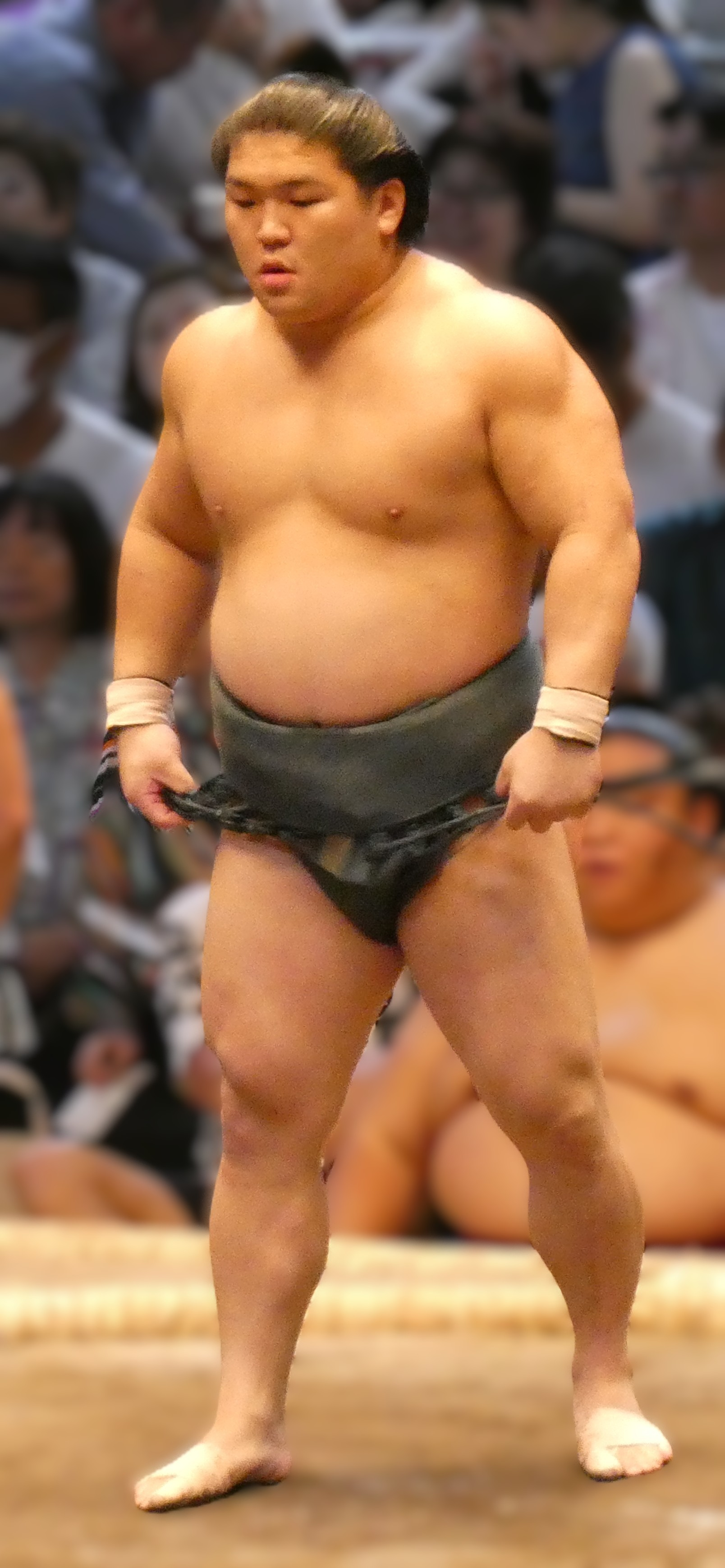

Personal information
- Native name: 朝紅龍 琢馬
- Born: Ishizaki Takuma (石崎 拓馬); September 24, 1998 (age 28) Shijonawate, Osaka, Japan
- Height: 1.78 m (5 ft 10 in)
- Weight: 125 kg (276 lb; 19.7 st)

Sport
- Sport: Sumo
- Rank: see below
- University team: Nippon Sport Science University
- Heya: Takasago
- Debut: May 2021
- Highest rank: Maegashira 7 (May 2026)
- Championships: 1 (Sandanme)
- Updated on April 27, 2026

Asakōryū Takuma (Japanese: 朝紅龍 琢馬) (born September 24, 1998) is a Japanese professional sumo wrestler from Shijonawate, Osaka. He made his debut in May 2021 and currently wrestles for Takasago stable. He reached the juryo division in September 2023. His highest rank as of May 2026 is Maegashira 7.

He is the older brother of Asasuiryū, a sumo wrestler from the same heya.

== Early life ==
Ishizaki began sumo wrestling during his third year at Kusunoki Elementary School in Shijonawate, Osaka. In addition to sumo wrestling, he practiced karate during his time in elementary school. Ishizaki went on to attend Meitoku Gijuku Junior & Senior High School and in his third year of junior high school he won the group championship at the prefectural tournament and took third place in the All-Japan Junior High School Sumo Tournament. After graduating high school, Ishizaki enrolled at Nippon Sport Science University's Faculty of Sport Science where he studied martial arts. In his first year at the school, Ishizaki won the East Japan Student Sumo Championship 115 kg weight class, and in his second year, he made the top 16 for the All Japan Sumo Championship. During his fourth year, he served as the captain of the sumo club and achieved third place at the National Student Sumo Championship. After graduating, Ishizaki opted to go pro and joined Takasago stable because the stablemaster (former sekiwake Asasekiryu) was an alumnus of Ishizaki's high school.

== Career ==
Due to Ishizaki's amateur accomplishments, he was granted sandanme tsukedashi status which allowed him to make his debut at the bottom of the sandanme division. He made his professional debut in May 2021 and won the sandanme championship with a perfect 7–0 record in his first tournament. He was promoted to makushita for the following July tournament where he won his first six matches before losing to Hokuseihō on the 13th day to finish with a 6–1 record. Ishizaki was promoted to a career-best makushita 1 rank for the January 2023 tournament, however, he finished with a poor 2–5 record and was unable to capitalize on a jūryō promotion. In July 2023, he finished with a 5–2 record at the rank of makushita 5 and was promoted to jūryō for the following September 2023 tournament. Upon promotion to jūryō, Ishizaki was given the shikona Asakōryū (朝紅龍). He finished with a 7–8 record in his first tournament as a sekitori, but bounced back with a 9–6 record in November 2023. After scoring 11 wins in September 2024, Asakōryū earned promotion to makuuchi for the first time. He ended his debut tournament with a losing record and was demoted to jūryō, though he immediately earned a return to the top division.

During the 2025 May tournament, Asakōryū was listed as a potential recipient of the special prize for Fighting spirit, conditional on him achieving an eleventh victory on the final day of the tournament. Asakōryū lost to Endō and did not win the award. This would end up being the final match of Endō's career. In July 2025, Asakōryū's brother, who also wrestled under the ring name Ishizaki, was promoted to the jūryō division making the two wrestlers the twenty-fourth pair of brothers to reach the sekitori ranks in sumo history.

At the May 2026 tournament, Asakōryū was fighting at a career-high rank of maegashira 7. On Day 6, he suffered an injury in his match against former ōzeki Shōdai. Asakōryū withdrew from the tournament on Day 7 to finish with a record of 3–4–8. Because he already had three wins, he was able to avoid demotion to the jūryō division.

When the banzuke for the September 2026 tournament was released, it was announced that Asakōryū's brother, Asasuiryū, was promoted in the makuuchi division. The two brothers became the fourteenth pair of brothers to compete simultaneously in the top division in the history of the sport. They both finished the tournament with winning records.

In November 20206, Asakōryū, who had suffered nine consecutive losses from the second day, withdrew due to pain in his knees and lower back, something he had been struggling with since before the tournament.

== Fighting style ==
Asakōryū is proficient in both yotsu-sumo (grappling) and oshi-sumo (pushing and thrusting) techniques. His most often used winning kimarite is oshidashi (push out), followed by yorikiri (force out).

== Career record ==
Asakōryū Takuma
Year	January Hatsu basho, Tokyo	March Haru basho, Osaka	May Natsu basho, Tokyo	July Nagoya basho, Nagoya	September Aki basho, Tokyo	November Kyūshū basho, Fukuoka
2021	x	x	Sandanme tsukedashi #100; 7–0; Champion	West Makushita #56; 6–1	East Makushita #25; 5–2	West Makushita #15; 3–4
2022	East Makushita #23; 1–3–3	East Makushita #51; 4–3	East Makushita #40; 5–2	East Makushita #26; 5–2	West Makushita #16; 5–2	East Makushita #8; 5–2
2023	West Makushita #1; 2–5	West Makushita #7; 3–4	East Makushita #11; 5–2	East Makushita #5; 5–2	West Jūryō #13; 7–8	West Jūryō #13; 9–6
2024	East Jūryō #9; 8–7	East Jūryō #8; 9–6	West Jūryō #4; 7–8	West Jūryō #4; 6–9	East Jūryō #8; 11–4	East Maegashira #17; 6–9
2025	West Jūryō #2; 9–6	East Maegashira #16; 6–9	East Maegashira #17; 10–5	West Maegashira #12; 6–9	West Maegashira #14; 6–9	West Maegashira #17; 8–7
2026	West Maegashira #15; 9–6	East Maegashira #12; 9–6	West Maegashira #7; 3–4–8	West Maegashira #16; 9–6	East Maegashira #13; 9–6	West Maegashira #9; 1–9–5
Record given as wins–losses–absences Top division champion Top division runner-up Retired Non-participation Jūryō Lower divisions Sanshō key: F=Fighting spirit; O=Outstanding performance; T=Technique Also shown: ★=Kinboshi; P=Playoff(s); Divisions: Makuuchi — Jūryō — Makushita — Sandanme — Jonidan — Jonokuchi Makuuchi ranks: Yokozuna — Ōzeki — Sekiwake — Komusubi — Maegashira

== See also ==
- Glossary of sumo terms
- List of active sumo wrestlers
