= Kotoeihō Hiroki =

Japanese sumo wrestler (born 2003)

Personal information
- Native name: 琴栄峰 央起
- Born: Taiki Tebakari; July 8, 2003 (age 23) Edogawa, Tokyo, Japan
- Height: 1.84 m (6 ft 1/2 in)
- Weight: 142 kg (313 lb; 22.4 st)

Sport
- Sport: Sumo
- Rank: see below
- Heya: Sadogatake
- Debut: January 2022
- Highest rank: Maegashira 1 (September 2026)
- Championships: 1 Jonidan; 1 Jonokuchi
- Special Prizes: Fighting Spirit (1)
- Updated on August 31, 2026

Kotoeihō Hiroki (Japanese: 琴栄峰 央起; born July 8, 2003 as Taiki Tebakari (手計 太希, Tebakari Taiki)) is a Japanese professional sumo wrestler from Kashiwa, Chiba. He wrestles for Sadogatake stable and is the younger brother of stablemate Kotoshōhō.

== Career ==
Kotoeihō began his sumo career at the age of 5 with the Kashiwa City Junior Sumo Club. After participating in the Wanpaku Sumo National Tournament in the fifth and sixth grade he was recruited by the coach of the Saitama Sakae High School sumo club along with his older brother Toshiki (Kotoshoho). He began living in the Saitama Sakae High School sumo club dormitory when he entered junior high. While attending Saitama Municipal Omiya Nishi Junior High School, he placed second in the Hakuho Cup in his third year and also won the Kanazawa Tournament. He joined the Sadogatake stable before he graduated high school, and made his professional debut in the January 2022 tournament. He adopted the shikona Kototebakari (琴手計) upon his debut.

In his first tournament in March 2022, he won all seven bouts and defeated Kotokenryu in a deciding match to win the Jonokuchi division. He won all seven bouts in the May tournament before defeating Hanafusa in the deciding match to win the Jonidan division. In the July tournament, he was promoted to the Sandanme division, but suffered his first professional loss in his second match, bringing his winning streak to an end after 15 matches. After winning his fifth match, he was forced to withdraw from the tournament due to an infection from COVID-19. In the September tournament, he recorded six wins and a loss, and was promoted to the Makushita division for the November tournament.

In the March 2023 tournament, he finished with 3 wins and 4 losses as the 17th ranked rikishi in the west makushita division, his first losing record since his debut. He got kachi-koshi in three consecutive tournaments from May to September, and in November, he was promoted to his highest ranking of 5th in the east makushita division. He suffered his fourth loss in the fifth match, and ended up with a losing record for his second make-koshi.

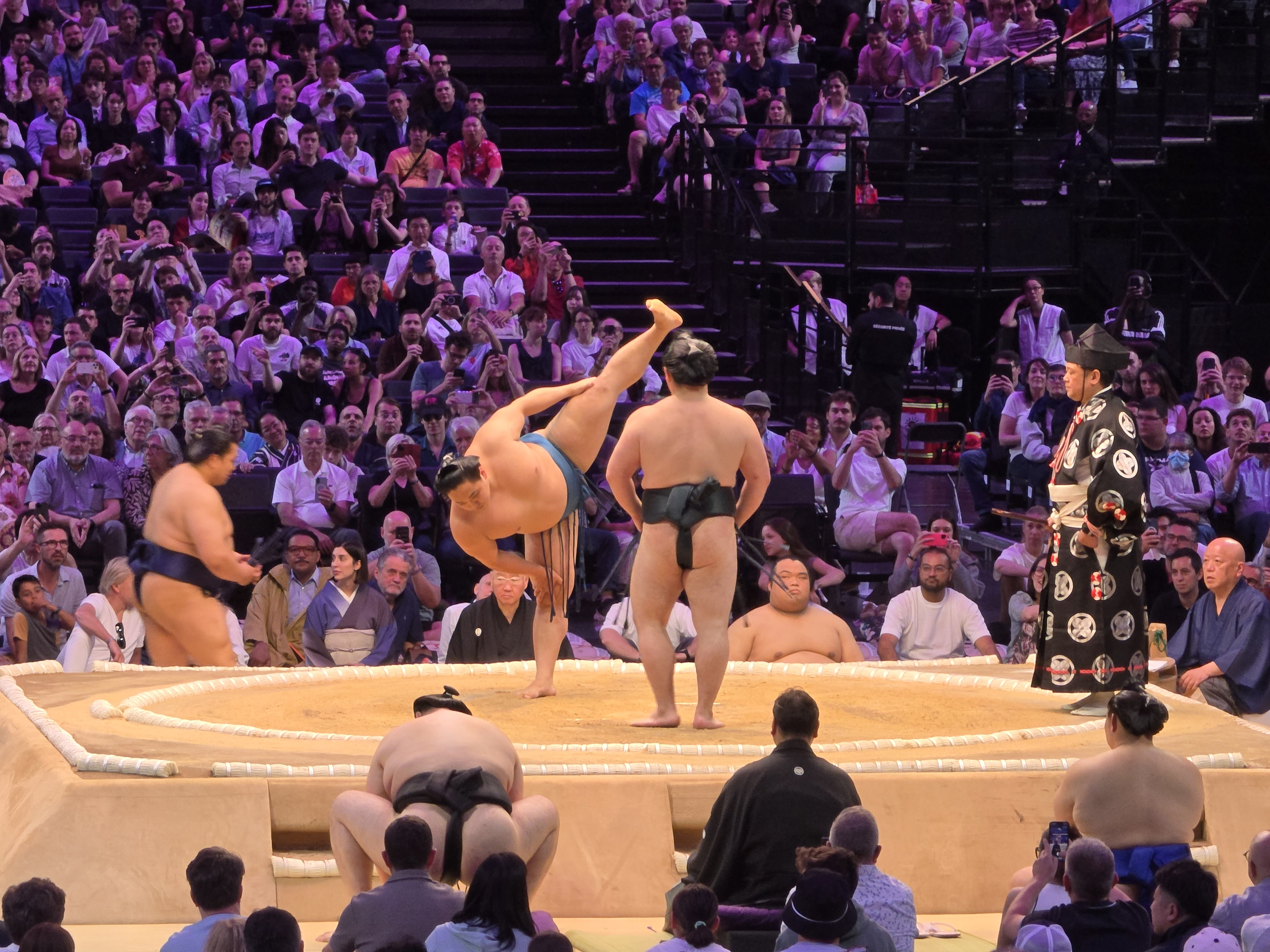
Kotoeihō excites audiences with his high-reaching shiko stomps. Pictured here at the 2026 Paris Grand Sumo Exhibition.

In 2024, he got kachi-koshi in two consecutive tournaments in January and March, and in the May tournament, he reached his highest rank of 2nd as East Makushita, but lost four matches in a row from the first bout, and finished with a record of 2 wins and 5 losses. In the July tournament, he got kachi-koshi, and in the September tournament, he was ranked 5th as West Makushita. It was his third time reaching the top 5 within the division. He finished the tournament with a record of 5 wins and 2 losses, and it was reported that his promotion to the Juryo division was inevitable. On September 25, the Japan Sumo Association held a meeting for the November tournament and it was decided that he would be promoted to the juryo division. It was also announced that he would be changing his shikona from Kototebakari to Kotoeihō, combining the characters "Koto" from his master's shikona, "Ei" from his alma mater, and "Ho" from his brother's shikona, which contains the same character as the character, "Mine", which conveys the meaning of aiming higher. Kotoeihō and his brother, Kotoshōhō, are the 22nd pair of brothers in history to be sekitori. He ended the November tournament with a losing record of 7 wins and 8 losses. During a morning practice on December 30, in an interview with Sports Hochi, he chose "luck" as the kanji for 2024, and stated, "I hope to be able to move up through my own ability next year. My goal is to reach the makuuchi division."

Kotoeihō made his debut in the makuuchi division in the July 2025 tournament. Pointing to his own shikona on the ranking list, he said with a smile, "I've always admired the top ranking since I was little, so I'm happy that I can be there too." Regarding the possibility of him and his brother Kotoshōhō entering the ring together, he commented, "That's something I've always aimed for, so I'm happy. I feel a sense of urgency that I can finally stand on the ring where my brother has fought."

Before the final day of the 2026 July tournament, it was announced that Kotoeihō could win his very first special prize for Fighting Spirit if he won his last match. Kotoeihō won against Takerufuji and earned the award.

Kotoeihō withdrew from the 2026 November tournament after the second day, citing a cervical disc herniation requiring four weeks of rest. Despite the recovery time, he eventually joined back later on.

== Career record ==
Kotoeihō Hiroki
Year	January Hatsu basho, Tokyo	March Haru basho, Osaka	May Natsu basho, Tokyo	July Nagoya basho, Nagoya	September Aki basho, Tokyo	November Kyūshū basho, Fukuoka
2022	(Maezumō)	East Jonokuchi #10; 7–0; Champion	East Jonidan #21; 7–0; Champion	East Sandanme #27; 4–2–1	West Sandanme #13; 6–1	East Makushita #37; 5–2
2023	West Makushita #22; 4–3	West Makushita #17; 3–4	East Makushita #23; 4–3	East Makushita #18; 5–2	East Makushita #9; 4–3	East Makushita #5; 3–4
2024	West Makushita #8; 4–3	East Makushita #6; 5–2	East Makushita #2; 2–5	West Makushita #8; 4–3	West Makushita #5; 5–2	West Jūryō #13; 7–8
2025	West Jūryō #13; 10–5	West Jūryō #7; 7–8	West Jūryō #7; 11–4	East Maegashira #17; 6–9	East Jūryō #2; 8–7	East Jūryō #2; 9–6
2026	East Jūryō #1; 8–7	West Maegashira #17; 9–6	East Maegashira #13; 10–5	East Maegashira #7; 11–4; F	West Maegashira #1; 5–10	West Maegashira #6; 7–2–6
Record given as wins–losses–absences Top division champion Top division runner-up Retired Non-participation Jūryō Lower divisions Sanshō key: F=Fighting spirit; O=Outstanding performance; T=Technique Also shown: ★=Kinboshi; P=Playoff(s); Divisions: Makuuchi — Jūryō — Makushita — Sandanme — Jonidan — Jonokuchi Makuuchi ranks: Yokozuna — Ōzeki — Sekiwake — Komusubi — Maegashira

== See also ==
- Glossary of sumo terms
- List of active sumo wrestlers
- List of non-Japanese sumo wrestlers
- List of active special prize winners
