= 2026 Paris sumo tournament =

Professional sumo exhibition tour held in Paris in 2026

Paris Sumo Tournament
- 2026
- Inside the arena on the first day

Tournament information
- Sport: Sumo
- Location: Paris, France
- Dates: 13 June 2026–14 June 2026
- Administrator: David Rothschild
- Tournament format: Single-elimination tournament
- Host: Japan Sumo Association
- Venue: Accor Arena
- Purse: A whole Wagyu cow worth of meat

Final positions
- Champion: (Japan) Kotozakura
- Runner-up: (Mongolia) Hōshōryū

The 2026 Paris sumo tournament (French: Tournoi de Paris de sumo), promoted in Japan as Ōzumō Pari kōen (Japanese: パリ相撲大会; Paris sumo exhibition) was a sumo competition held exceptionally in Paris, France, on June 13 and 14. The event is a joint effort between the Japan Sumo Association, the governing body of professional sumo in Japan, and David Rothschild, a promoter of sports and cultural events. The event is the first one organized by the Japan Sumo Association on French soil in about 30 years, being the third overall held in Paris and the first since 1995.

The event took the form of a tour (known as jungyō in Japan), designed to showcase the traditional arts associated with professional sumo, which remain deeply rooted in Japanese culture and the traditional arts. As the highlight of the event, a single-elimination tournament was organized to determine the winner among the 41 rikishi (or wrestlers) from the makuuchi division—the highest professional division in sumo—who were participating in the event. The tournament consisted of two rounds, the winners of each day's matches faced off in the grand final on the last day. The tournament was won by ōzeki Kotozakura, the winner of the first day, who defeated yokozuna Hōshōryū, the winner of the second day.

Described as "exceptional", the event had a strong cultural focus, with numerous side events such as conferences, exhibitions, and dance performances, and with the French media relaying the rituals, traditions, and symbolism of the sport.

== Background and history ==
In early 2025, it was announced that the Japan Sumo Association would return to France for an international tour for the first time in 30 years. The tour was part of a broader effort to revive competitions abroad, with the first event being a five-day tournament scheduled at the Royal Albert Hall in London in 2025.

France has historically strong, long-standing ties not only with Japan but also with sumo. In 1986, France had already hosted a three-day sumo tour, the first of its kind, that also marked the Japan Sumo Association's first-ever tour of Europe. Jacques Chirac, who was known as a sumo enthusiast and was then Prime Minister, was also credited with having been instrumental in bringing the Japan Sumo Association to France for the first time in 1986—again at the Paris-Bercy arena—an event that culminated in a cultural program called "The Tokyo Season in Paris" (La saison de Tokyo à Paris), focusing on the arts, traditions, crafts, and everyday life in Japan. Thirty-two wrestlers competed, with yokozuna Chiyonofuji emerging victorious from the tournament. The second tour of France took place in 1995, under the presidency of Jacques Chirac, featuring high-profile sumo wrestlers such as Akebono and Takanohana. In fact, many Japanese who participated as wrestlers at the time went on to become executives of the association and returned to France to help organize the tournament, such as Nakadachi (the former Oginishiki) and Mihogaseki (the former Tochisakae).

Historically, sumo wrestlers had already gone on tours in the 20th century, at a time when the Japan Sumo Association did not yet exist as such. In 1910, the landscape of sumo's governing bodies was different, and the now-defunct Kyoto-sumo association was the first to organize a tour to London for the Japan–British Exhibition in White City, London. During that exhibition, a group of wrestlers led by yokozuna Ōikari had already begun a tour of Europe, starting in London.

== Organization ==
Organizing the event took about ten years of negotiations and several trips to Japan over the course of a year and a half of preparation.

To meet the specific requirements of the Japan Sumo Association, special logistical arrangements were made for the tournament in order to recreate the traditional setting in which professional sumo is held. The organizers had to send a sample of the soil used to build the ring (called dohyō) to Japan and to avoid disrupting the wrestlers traditional topknots (called chonmage), Japanese officials from the association tested the tap water to determine whether it would be suitable for their shampoos, checking in particular for its calcium content, without which they would have had to use bottled water. Finally, the costumes and ceremonial attire of the wrestlers, referees, and judges were the subject of particular care, especially since during the last tour in Paris in 1995, a fire in a warehouse at the airport had destroyed these precious items—an event that had been experienced as a source of trauma by the organizers. The roof suspended above the ring also had to be imported from Japan. Due to the size and weight of the wrestlers, the restrooms at Accor Arena and the Japanese delegation's hotel had to be reinforced. To accommodate the traditional setting of the matches, soil samples were sent to France so that the tournament organizers could select a similar type of soil to build the dohyō (sumo ring). 200 kilograms of Guérande fleur de sel salt, a purification element used in sumo rituals, was also ordered from Le Croisic.

An initial delegation traveled to Paris from Japan in February 2025, accompanied by sumo wrestlers Tochitaikai and Tochikodai, to verify that all the equipment to be used by the wrestlers was the correct size. This first visit was also intended as an initial public relations effort, and the wrestlers were able to visit the Eiffel Tower and the Arc de Triomphe.

For safety reasons, the delegation of association staff also traveled on two different planes. This is because the two highest-ranked wrestlers cannot travel together, so as to ensure the continuity of the rankings in the event of an accident. A first delegation of 130 people set out on June 9, led by yokozuna Hōshōryū, while the second group, led by yokozuna Ōnosato, departed on June 10.

Unlike the event in London the previous year, the Paris event was conceived as a genuine tour featuring demonstrations of traditional arts associated with professional sumo (such as topknot tying, traditional drumming and sumo folk songs), whereas the tournament held at the Royal Albert Hall had focused on highlighting the return of an international sumo event—a true phenomenon after a 30-year hiatus—and had promoted it as a full-fledged tournament. For the Japan Sumo Association, the event was an opportunity to expand its audience to include French-speaking viewers. The sport's image could also benefit from the tour after a decade of suffering from the various scandals that have plagued the sport.

At the same time, the event organizers wanted to give the tournament a more cultural focus, which led to the simultaneous organization of several events, notably at the Japanese Culture House of Paris, which hosted a conference attended by sumo wrestlers Ōshōma and Ichiyamamoto, as well as film screenings and a photo exhibition.

== Roster ==
The Paris tour is based on the makuuchi division rankings for the May 2026 tournament (honbasho), widely known in sumo as Natsu basho (夏場所, "Summer tournament"), which took place from May 10 to 24 of this year. The tournament rankings were announced on April 27. Any promotion to the makuuchi division at that time guaranteed the presence of the wrestler in question on the tour, while any demotion to the jūryō division (the second-highest professional division) meant the wrestler would not participate.

The Paris tournament took place during a period marked by several injuries, particularly among the top-ranked wrestlers, with yokozuna Ōnosato and ōzeki Aonishiki sitting out from the May tournament preceding the Paris tour, and yokozuna Hōshōryū, and ōzeki Kotozakura being forced to withdraw during the tournament due to injury. When the tour was announced, it wasn't yet certain that any of these major wrestlers would be able to participate. For his part, Aonishiki, who was kadoban for the May tournament, was certain to be demoted to the rank of sekiwake for the July tournament following his absence due to injury. The only participant absent from the tour, former ōzeki Asanoyama, had to withdraw from the Paris performance due to a sprained left ankle that also had forced him to withdraw from the May tournament starting on the twelfth day.

The rankings of the wrestlers competing in the Paris tournament were as follows:

2026 Natsu basho - Makuuchi rankings
East		Rank	West	
(Mongolia)	Hōshōryū	Y	(Japan)	Ōnosato
(Japan)	Kotozakura	O	(Ukraine)	Aonishiki
(Mongolia)	Kirishima	O		
(Japan)	Atamifuji	S	(Japan)	Kotoshōhō
(Japan)	Wakatakakage	K	(Japan)	Takayasu
(Japan)	Fujinokawa	M1	(Japan)	Takanoshō
(Japan)	Yoshinofuji	M2	(Japan)	Ichiyamamoto
(Japan)	Hiradoumi	M3	(Japan)	Ōhō
(Japan)	Daieishō	M4	(Japan)	Gōnoyama
(Japan)	Wakamotoharu	M5	(Japan)	Shōdai
(Japan)	Churanoumi	M6	(Japan)	Fujiseiun
(Mongolia)	Chiyoshōma	M7	(Japan)	Asakōryū
(Mongolia)	Ōshōma	M8	(Mongolia)	Asahakuryū
(Japan)	Abi	M9	(Japan)	Nishikifuji
(Japan)	Asanoyama	M10	(Japan)	Hakunofuji
(Japan)	Ura	M11	(Kazakhstan)	Kinbōzan
(Ukraine)	Shishi	M12	(Japan)	Tokihayate
(Japan)	Kotoeihō	M13	(Mongolia)	Tamawashi
(Japan)	Mitakeumi	M14	(Russia)	Rōga
(Japan)	Tobizaru	M15	(Japan)	Ōshōumi
(Japan)	Wakanoshō	M16	(Japan)	Ryūden
(Japan)	Fujiryōga	M17		

Legend
Name
Nationality	Shikona
	Wrestler(s) absent due to injury

== Tournament summary ==
Colorful nobori (banners) displaying the names of the tournament participants on display in front of the Accor Arena in Bercy.

The event took the form of a jungyō tour, with wins and losses not counting toward the banzuke (rankings) as they do in major tournaments, known as honbasho. Since the results of the matches did not count toward the rankings for the upcoming tournament, it is widely accepted that, as with all matches held during tours, these matches were exhibition contests intended for entertainment rather than carefully prepared and seriously contested bouts.

Like all tour competitions, the Paris tournament took the form of a competition among the members of the makuuchi division, the highest of the six divisions in professional sumo. From an organizational standpoint, the tournament consisted of six rounds, the first of which involved only the 18 lowest-ranked wrestlers on the banzuke, who had to compete against each other to advance in the tournament and face the remaining wrestlers in the round of 32.

The two days of the tournament were a success, with a full house throughout the entire event. Among the spectators, French judoka Teddy Riner was notably in attendance on the second day of the tournament.

On the first day, neither of the two yokozuna made it to the final: Ōnosato was eliminated in the third round, and Hōshōryū lost in the semifinals. However, two ōzeki faced off in the final of the first day, with Kirishima taking on Kotozakura, the latter emerging victorious. On the second day, Hōshōryū advanced to the semifinals and defeated komusubi Takayasu to qualify for the grand final. In the grand final on the last day, ōzeki Kotozakura, winner of the first day, was crowned the winner of the competition after defeating yokozuna Hōshōryū, winner of the second day, by yorikiri. This victory was seen as a breath of fresh air for the ōzeki after several months of struggling without achieving any concrete results.

== Matches ==
=== Day 1 ===
Matches scheduled on June 13

Last 18
M13e	Kotoeihō (JAP)
M12w	Tokihayate (JAP)
M17e	Fujiryōga (JAP)
M8e	Ōshōma (MGL)
M8w	Asahakuryū (MGL)
M16w	Ryūden (JAP)
M15e	Tobizaru (JAP)
M10w	Hakunofuji (JAP)
M11e	Ura (JAP)
M14w	Rōga (RUS)
M14e	Mitakeumi (JAP)
M11w	Kinbōzan (KAZ)
M9w	Nishikifuji (JAP)
M15w	Ōshōumi (JAP)
M16e	Wakanoshō (JAP)
M9e	Abi (JAP)
M12e	Shishi (UKR)
M13w	Tamawashi (MGL)

Round of 32
Y1e	Hōshōryū (MGL)
M13e	Kotoeihō (JAP)
M4w	Gōnoyama (JAP)
M4e	Daieishō (JAP)
K1w	Takayasu (JAP)
M8e	Ōshōma (MGL)
M16w	Ryūden (JAP)
K1e	Wakatakakage (JAP)
O2e	Kirishima (MGL)
M15e	Tobizaru (JAP)
M6w	Fujiseiun (JAP)
M2e	Yoshinofuji (JAP)
M11e	Ura (JAP)
O1w	Aonishiki (UKR)
M2w	Ichiyamamoto (JAP)
M6e	Churanoumi (JAP)
O1e	Kotozakura (JAP)
M11w	Kinbōzan (KAZ)
M5w	Shōdai (JAP)
M3e	Hiradoumi (JAP)
M9w	Nishikifuji (JAP)
S1e	Atamifuji (JAP)
M1w	Takanoshō (JAP)
M7e	Chiyoshōma (MGL)
S1w	Kotoshōhō (JAP)
M9e	Abi (JAP)
M7w	Asakōryū (JAP)
M1e	Fujinokawa (JAP)
M13w	Tamawashi (MGL)
Y1w	Ōnosato (JAP)
M3w	Ōhō (JAP)
M5e	Wakamotoharu (JAP)

Round of 16
Y1e	Hōshōryū (MGL)
M4w	Gōnoyama (JAP)
K1w	Takayasu (JAP)
K1e	Wakatakakage (JAP)
O2e	Kirishima (MGL)
M6w	Fujiseiun (JAP)
M6e	Churanoumi (JAP)
O1w	Aonishiki (UKR)
O1e	Kotozakura (JAP)
M3e	Hiradoumi (JAP)
M7e	Chiyoshōma (MGL)
S1e	Atamifuji (JAP)
M9e	Abi (JAP)
M1e	Fujinokawa (JAP)
M5e	Wakamotoharu (JAP)
Y1w	Ōnosato (JAP)

Quarter-finals
Y1e	Hōshōryū (MGL)
K1w	Takayasu (JAP)
O2e	Kirishima (MGL)
O1w	Aonishiki (UKR)
O1e	Kotozakura (JAP)
M7e	Chiyoshōma (MGL)
M9e	Abi (JAP) (Note: After a rematch following a mono-ii decision.)
M5e	Wakamotoharu (JAP)

Semi-finals
Y1e	Hōshōryū (JAP)
O2e	Kirishima (MGL)
O1e	Kotozakura (JAP)
M9e	Abi (JAP)

Final
O2e	Kirishima (MGL)
O1e	Kotozakura (JAP)

=== Day 2 ===
Matches scheduled on June 14

Last 18
M13e	Kotoeihō (JAP)
M12e	Shishi (UKR)
M8e	Ōshōma (MGL)
M16e	Wakanoshō (JAP)
M15w	Ōshōumi (JAP)
M9e	Abi (JAP)
M11e	Ura (JAP)
M14e	Mitakeumi (JAP)
M14w	Rōga (RUS)
M11w	Kinbōzan (KAZ)
M9w	Nishikifuji (JAP)
M15e	Tobizaru (JAP)
M16w	Ryūden (JAP)
M10w	Hakunofuji (JAP)
M8w	Asahakuryū (MGL)
M17e	Fujiryōga (JAP)
M12w	Tokihayate (JAP)
M13w	Tamawashi (MGL)

Round of 32
Y1e	Hōshōryū (MGL)
M13e	Kotoeihō (JAP)
M4w	Gōnoyama (JAP)
M3w	Ōhō (JAP)
M1e	Fujinokawa (JAP)
M7e	Chiyoshōma (MGL)
M8e	Ōshōma (MGL)
S1e	Atamifuji (JAP)
S1w	Kotoshōhō (JAP)
M9e	Abi (JAP)
M6w	Fujiseiun (JAP)
M1w	Takanoshō (JAP)
M3e	Hiradoumi (JAP)
M6e	Churanoumi (JAP)
M11e	Ura (JAP)
O1e	Kotozakura (JAP)
O1w	Aonishiki (UKR)
M14w	Rōga (RUS)
M5w	Shōdai (JAP)
M2w	Ichiyamamoto (JAP)
M2e	Yoshinofuji (JAP)
M7w	Asakōryū (JAP)
M15e	Tobizaru (JAP)
K1e	Wakatakakage (JAP)
O2e	Kirishima (MGL)
M16w	Ryūden (JAP)
M17e	Fujiryōga (JAP)
K1w	Takayasu (JAP)
M4e	Daieishō (JAP)
M5e	Wakamotoharu (JAP)
M13w	Tamawashi (MGL)
Y1w	Ōnosato (JAP)

Round of 16
Y1e	Hōshōryū (MGL)
M4w	Gōnoyama (JAP)
M7e	Chiyoshōma (MGL)
S1e	Atamifuji (JAP)
S1w	Kotoshōhō (JAP)
M6w	Fujiseiun (JAP)
M3e	Hiradoumi (JAP)
O1e	Kotozakura (JAP)
O1w	Aonishiki (UKR)
M5w	Shōdai (JAP)
M2e	Yoshinofuji (JAP)
M15e	Tobizaru (JAP)
O2e	Kirishima (MGL)
K1w	Takayasu (JAP)
M4e	Daieishō (JAP)
Y1w	Ōnosato (JAP)

Quarter-finals
Y1e	Hōshōryū (MGL)
S1e	Atamifuji (JAP)
M6w	Fujiseiun (JAP)
O1e	Kotozakura (JAP)
O1w	Aonishiki (UKR)
M15e	Tobizaru (JAP)
K1w	Takayasu (JAP)
M4e	Daieishō (JAP)

Semi-finals
Y1e	Hōshōryū (MGL)
O1e	Kotozakura (JAP)
M15e	Tobizaru (JAP)
K1w	Takayasu (JAP)

Final
Y1e	Hōshōryū (MGL)
K1w	Takayasu (JAP)

=== Grand final ===
Grand Final held on the last day of the tournament

Finals
Y1e	Hōshōryū (MGL)
O1e	Kotozakura (JAP)
