= Fujinokawa =

Fujinokawa may refer to:

- Fujinokawa Takeo (born 1946), sumo wrestler, former sekiwake
- Fujinokawa Seigō (born 2005), sumo wrestler, son of former maegashira Ōikari
