= Nishikido =

Nishikido may refer to:

- Mitoizumi Masayuki
- Nishikido stable
- Ryo Nishikido
