= Fujinishiki Akira =

Sumo wrestler (1937–2003)

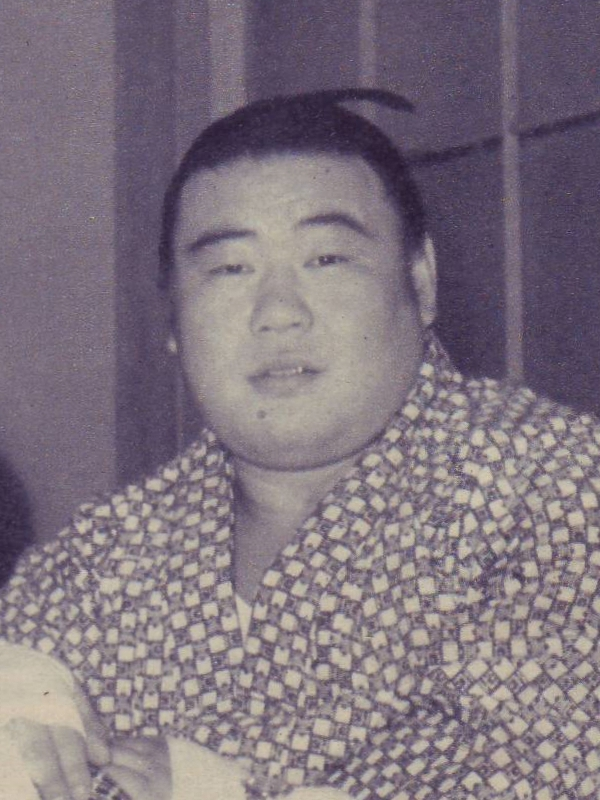

Personal information
- Native name: 富士錦 猛光
- Born: Akira Watanabe; 18 March 1937 Yamanashi, Japan
- Died: 17 December 2003 (aged 66)
- Height: 1.75 m (5 ft 9 in)
- Weight: 136 kg (300 lb)

Sport
- Sport: Sumo
- Retired: November, 1968
- Heya: Takasago
- Record: 576-560-5
- Debut: March, 1953
- Highest rank: Komusubi (March, 1960)
- Elder name: Wakamatsu
- Championships: 1 (Makuuchi); 1 (Makushita)
- Special Prizes: Outstanding Performance (2); Fighting Spirit (4); Technique (1)
- Gold Stars: 7 Tochinoumi (3); Kashiwado (2); Wakanohana I Sadanoyama
- Updated on June 2020

Fujinishiki Akira (born Akira Watanabe, also known as Akira Ichimiya, 18 March 1937 – 17 December 2003) was a sumo wrestler from Kofu, Yamanashi, Japan. His highest rank was komusubi, which he held on ten occasions. He won the top makuuchi division tournament championship or yūshō in 1964 and was runner-up in two other tournaments. He won seven special prizes and seven gold stars for defeating yokozuna. After his retirement in 1968 he was an elder of the Japan Sumo Association and was the head coach of Takasago stable from 1988 until shortly before his retirement from the Sumo Association in 2002. He died of liver disease in 2003.

== Career ==
Making his debut in 1953, he wrestled for Takasago stable, home of then yokozuna Azumafuji to whom the "Fuji" part of his shikona referred. He first entered the top makuuchi division in 1959 and was runner-up in two tournaments that year, winning a special prize for Fighting Spirit in each. His highest rank was komusubi, which he first reached in 1960. He spent a total of ten tournaments at that rank, the last coming in 1967, but never managed to earn promotion to sekiwake. He never managed to win more than eight bouts as a komusubi but was somewhat unlucky not be promoted after two consecutive 8–7 records at the rank in 1961, and he was regarded as certainly being of sekiwake level in ability. He holds the modern record for most tournaments at komusubi without reaching sekiwake.

The highlight of his career came in July 1964 when he took the top division championship or yūshō with a 14–1 record. He was ranked as a maegashira at the time and did not meet any ōzeki or yokozuna during the tournament. He defeated sekiwake Kitanofuji on the final day, avoiding the need for a playoff with ōzeki Yutakayama. He was perhaps fortunate that yokozuna Taihō, who won four championships in that year alone, dropped out after five days.

His tsukebito or personal attendant was Hawaiian born Takamiyama, later to become the first foreigner to win a championship, and Fujinishiki was one of the wrestlers who helped introduce him to sumo and Japanese culture. His mentorship of Takamiyama continued as a coach after his retirement from the ring.

== Retirement from sumo ==
Following his retirement as an active wrestler in November 1968 he stayed at Takasago stable as a coach under the elder name of Nishiiwa. In 1988, he became head of the stable, following the death of former yokozuna Asashio Tarō III. He coached Konishiki, Mitoizumi and Senshuyama amongst others. He also served on the Japan Sumo Association's board of directors. However, after his wrestler Tōki was involved in a car accident that killed a pedestrian in December 2000, he was punished by a demotion and a reduction in salary. In February 2002, in failing health, he passed on ownership of the stable to former ōzeki Asashio Tarō IV, who merged his Wakamatsu stable with Takasago's. He let his former wrestler Mitoizumi use the old Takasago premises to launch Nishikido stable. He remained as a coach under the Wakamatsu name until his retirement the following month upon reaching 65, and continued to attend training sessions after that. He died of liver disease in December 2003.

== Fighting style ==
He specialized in pushing and thrusting techniques (tsuki/oshi) and was known for his strong tachi-ai or initial charge.

== Personal life ==
His eldest son Shōichi, born in 1969, is a professional wrestler. His second eldest son Akihiro was once the personal manager of yokozuna Asashoryu (who was criticized for failing to attend Fujinishiki's funeral). It was Akihiro who was initially reported to have been punched by Asashoryu in a drunken brawl at a dance club in January 2010, although it soon emerged it was the manager of the club and this led to the yokozuna's enforced retirement.

He was seen in the 1967 James Bond film You Only Live Twice, fighting in a bout against Kotozakura.

== Career record ==
- The Kyushu tournament was first held in 1957, and the Nagoya tournament in 1958.

Fujinishiki Akira
Year	January Hatsu basho, Tokyo	March Haru basho, Osaka	May Natsu basho, Tokyo	July Nagoya basho, Nagoya	September Aki basho, Tokyo	November Kyūshū basho, Fukuoka
1953	x	Shinjo; 3–0	West Jonidan #26; 5–3	Not held	East Jonidan #10; 4–4	Not held
1954	East Jonidan #5; 5–3	West Sandanme #50; 4–4	East Sandanme #48; 4–4	Not held	West Sandanme #44; 6–2	Not held
1955	East Sandanme #29; 5–3	East Sandanme #8; 4–4	East Sandanme #3; 3–5	Not held	West Sandanme #5; 5–3	Not held
1956	East Makushita #53; 5–3	West Makushita #43; 6–2	East Makushita #35; 6–2	Not held	West Makushita #24; 7–1–P; Champion	Not held
1957	West Makushita #6; 2–6	East Makushita #15; 7–1	East Makushita #3; 3–5	Not held	East Makushita #8; 4–4	East Makushita #8; 5–3
1958	West Makushita #4; 6–2	West Jūryō #24; 8–7	East Jūryō #23; 11–4–P	West Jūryō #14; 8–7	West Jūryō #10; 11–4	West Jūryō #2; 11–4
1959	East Maegashira #18; 5–10	East Jūryō #3; 12–3	West Maegashira #18; 9–6	West Maegashira #14; 12–3; F	West Maegashira #3; 4–11	East Maegashira #11; 12–3; F
1960	East Maegashira #2; 9–6	West Komusubi #1; 7–8	West Maegashira #2; 5–10	West Maegashira #6; 5–10 ★	East Maegashira #7; 6–9	East Maegashira #11; 11–4
1961	East Maegashira #4; 10–5; F	West Komusubi #2; 8–7	East Komusubi; 7–8	East Maegashira #1; 9–6	East Komusubi #1; 8–7	East Komusubi #1; 8–7
1962	West Komusubi #1; 4–11	East Maegashira #5; 7–8	West Maegashira #4; 4–11	West Maegashira #10; 9–6	East Maegashira #5; 8–7	West Maegashira #1; 4–11
1963	West Maegashira #7; 11–4	East Maegashira #1; 8–7; O	West Komusubi #1; 4–11	West Maegashira #3; 9–6; O	West Komusubi #1; 2–8–5	West Maegashira #7; 8–7
1964	West Maegashira #3; 7–8	West Maegashira #3; 4–11	West Maegashira #5; 5–10	West Maegashira #9; 14–1; FT	East Komusubi #1; 4–11	West Maegashira #4; 6–9 ★
1965	East Maegashira #6; 8–7	West Maegashira #3; 5–10	West Maegashira #5; 6–9	West Maegashira #7; 10–5	East Maegashira #3; 7–8 ★★	West Maegashira #3; 8–7
1966	East Maegashira #3; 8–7	West Maegashira #2; 6–9 ★	West Maegashira #3; 9–6 ★	East Maegashira #1; 6–9	West Maegashira #3; 7–8	West Maegashira #3; 10–5
1967	West Komusubi #2; 6–9	East Maegashira #2; 8–7 ★	East Maegashira #1; 2–13	West Maegashira #5; 7–8	West Maegashira #6; 5–10	East Maegashira #9; 8–7
1968	East Maegashira #7; 8–7	West Maegashira #5; 5–10	West Maegashira #8; 7–8	East Maegashira #9; 6–9	East Maegashira #12; 8–7	West Maegashira #9; Retired; 1–14
Record given as wins–losses–absences Top division champion Top division runner-up Retired Lower divisions Non-participation Sanshō key: F=Fighting spirit; O=Outstanding performance; T=Technique Also shown: ★=Kinboshi; P=Playoff(s); Divisions: Makuuchi — Jūryō — Makushita — Sandanme — Jonidan — Jonokuchi Makuuchi ranks: Yokozuna — Ōzeki — Sekiwake — Komusubi — Maegashira

== See also ==
- Glossary of sumo terms
- List of past sumo wrestlers
- List of sumo tournament top division champions
- List of sumo tournament top division runners-up
- List of komusubi
