= Ōshōumi Seiya =

Sumo wrestler

Personal information
- Native name: 欧勝海 成矢
- Born: Seiya Fukasawa; May 12, 2001 (age 25) Tsubata, Ishikawa, Japan
- Height: 1.84 m (6 ft 1/2 in)
- Weight: 148 kg (326 lb; 23.3 st)

Sport
- Sport: Sumo
- Rank: see below
- Heya: Naruto
- Debut: March 2020
- Highest rank: Maegashira 11 (March 2026)
- Championships: 1 Sandanme; 1 Jonidan
- Updated on February 24, 2026

Ōshōumi Seiya (Japanese: 欧勝海 成矢; born May 12, 2001 as Seiya Fukasawa (深沢 成矢, Fukasawa Seiya)) is a Japanese professional sumo wrestler from Ishikawa Prefecture. His highest rank is maegashira 11. He wrestles for Naruto stable.

== Early life and career ==
Ōshōumi Seiya was born on 12 May, 2001, in Tsubata, Ishikawa is the second of three brothers. He attended Tsubata Town Youth Sumo School, and was invited to Niigata Prefectural Marine High School by Ōnosato. He considered attending university, but he instead decided to join the Naruto stable.

== Professional career ==
Ōshōumi made his sumo debut in the March 2020 tournament. In the November tournament that year, he faced his stablemate Osuzuki in a deciding match and won by yorikiri to secure the championship in the jonidan division. He then advanced through the sandanme division was promoted to makushita in the March 2021 tournament. In his second makushita tournament in May that year, he withdrew midway through due to a left ankle injury, marking his first losing record since his debut. After his absence, in the July tournament following his absence, he changed his shikona to "Ōshōumi". After changing his name, he maintained a winning record in two consecutive tournaments. However, in the November tournament of the same year, when he was ranked at his highest rank of west makushita (7th), after winning his first bout, he was forced to withdraw from the second bout. He returned and won his fifth bout, but was forced to withdraw for the final match.

He also withdrew from the second bout of the following January 2022 tournament, and subsequently underwent surgery to fully recover, missing two consecutive tournaments. After returning from labrum surgery in the July tournament that year, he was ranked at west jonidan (6th) and won four consecutive bouts from the first bout, but was forced to withdraw from the fifth bout after a member of the Naruto stable was found to have been infected with COVID-19. In the September tournament, when he returned to sandanme, he won all seven bouts as the 78th ranked wrestler in east sandanme, winning the championship. He continued to win after returning to the makushita division in November 2022.

=== Jūryō promotion ===
In the November 2023 tournament he finished with a record of 4 wins and 3 losses as the second ranked wrestler in the west makushita division. At the ranking meeting held after the tournament, it was decided that he would be promoted to the jūryō division in the January 2024 tournament.

At the press conference announcing his promotion to the jūryō division, he reflected on the three and a half years since his debut, saying, "It seemed long, but it was short," and expressed his enthusiasm, saying, "I'm still behind (Ōnosato), so I want to catch up quickly." When he heard that his mother would be hospitalized for eye surgery during the November 2023 tournament, he became determined, saying, "I have to decide (my promotion) now."

On the 14th day of the January 2024 tournament, he achieved his first winning record as a sekitori. When he achieved his winning record, he commented, "Before the tournament, I said, 'I want to win more matches than I lose, so I want to cheer up my hometown,' so I'm glad that I was able to achieve that. I'm glad that this performance will help me in the next tournament." and that he was glad to obtain a winning record to cheer up his hometown, who had been stricken by the 2024 Noto earthquake three weeks prior. In the following tournament, he rose to his highest rank of jūryō 11. However, on the 14th day he was defeated by Shirokuma with an uwatenage throw, marking his first losing record in 11 tournaments. He also lost on the final day, finishing with a record of 6 wins and 9 losses.

In the May tournament, he suffered three straight losses at the beginning of the tournament and had a record of 2 wins and 8 losses on the 10th day. He lost again the next day, falling to nine losses. After a comeback with three straight wins from day 12, he lost on the final day, finishing with a record of 5 wins and 10 losses, resulting in a demotion to the makushita division after three tournaments in the jūryō division.

In the July tournament, he was ranked makushita 3, where he finished with a record of 5–2. At the ranking meeting on the 31st of that month, he was promoted again to the jūryō division. In the September tournament, he ranked at jūryō 14, but on the 13th day he was confirmed to have a losing record. On the final day, he lost to Wakaikari (later Fujinokawa), finishing with a record of 6–9, putting him at risk of demotion to makushita. Immediately after the tournament, he served as the flag bearer for the makuuchi victory parade for his childhood friend, Ōnosato, and that he was happy and honored to do so. However, he clinched the lowest rank of jūryō, 14 west, for the November tournament. In the November tournament, he was tied for first place in the jūryō division with a record of 9 wins and 1 loss at the end of the 10th day, but withdrew from the tournament on the 11th day. He returned on the 14th day and finished with a record of 10 wins, 3 losses, and 2 absences.

In the January 2025 tournament, he rose five ranks to ninth in the west jūryō division. He had a strong 6–2 record until the middle of the tournament, but suffered four straight losses from day nine, bringing his record to 6–6. However, he won three straight matches from the thirteenth day to finish with a 9–6 record. In the March tournament, he achieved his highest ranking of fourth in the west jūryō division. After a win on the first day, he was on a 2–2 record. On the fifth day, he injured his foot in a bout against Mitoryū. He received a medical certificate stating that he had a sprained Lisfranc joint in his left leg, which would require two-weeks to recover. After his absence in the May tournament, he returned to the top of the west jūryō division and had three consecutive winning records. In the September tournament, he was ranked as the top west jūryō wrestler and had a 9–6 winning record. His nine wins raised the possibility of a promotion to the makuuchi division in the following November tournament.

=== Makuuchi promotion ===
Ōshōumi made his makuuchi division debut in the November 2025 tournament. This will be the first time a wrestler from Ishikawa Prefecture has made it to the top makuuchi division since Ōnosato in the January 2024 tournament. He won his first makuuchi bout, against Shonannoumi, but went on an eight-bout losing streak from day 2. He concluded the tournament with six straight wins, achieving a 7–8 record, giving him a chance to stay in the makuuchi division. At the Hatsu 2026 tournament, Ōshōumi had a very strong performance, being involved in the title race going into the final days of the tournament. Ōshōumi faced Atamifuji on the final day, with a victory awarding him a Fighting Spirit Prize and potentially forcing a four-way playoff for the championship. However, Atamifuji won the match, eliminating Ōshōumi from the title race and denying him a Fighting Spirit Prize.

During the July 2026 tournament, Ōshōumi was injured when he fell after his loss on the fourth day and had to be wheeled out in a wheelchair. The next day, it was confirmed to the press that Ōshōumi would withdraw from the remainder of the tournament after suffering a fractured fibula that required surgery. His absence makes a demotion to the makushita division highly likely for the September tournament. After sitting out a tournament, Ōshōumi announced that he would compete in the November tournament, having missed his first five days of it.

== Career record ==
Ōshōumi Seiya
Year	January Hatsu basho, Tokyo	March Haru basho, Osaka	May Natsu basho, Tokyo	July Nagoya basho, Nagoya	September Aki basho, Tokyo	November Kyūshū basho, Fukuoka
2020	x	(Maezumō)	West Jonokuchi #15; Tournament Cancelled; State of Emergency; 0–0–0	West Jonokuchi #15; 5–2	East Jonidan #79; 6–1	West Jonidan #6; 7–0; Champion
2021	East Sandanme #15; 5–2	East Makushita #53; 5–2	West Makushita #33; 2–2–3	East Makushita #52; 6–1	East Makushita #23; 6–1	West Makushita #7; 2–2–3
2022	East Makushita #21; 0–2–5	West Makushita #56; Sat out due to injury 0–0–7	East Sandanme #36; Sat out due to injury 0–0–7	West Jonidan #6; 4–0–3	East Sandanme #73; 7–0; Champion	East Makushita #54; 4–3
2023	West Makushita #45; 5–2	West Makushita #29; 5–2	East Makushita #22; 4–3	West Makushita #16; 4–3	West Makushita #11; 5–2	West Makushita #2; 4–3
2024	West Jūryō #13; 8–7	East Jūryō #11; 6–9	East Jūryō #13; 5–10	West Makushita #3; 5–2	West Jūryō #14; 6–9	West Jūryō #14; 10–3–2
2025	West Jūryō #9; 9–6	West Jūryō #4; 4–7–4	East Jūryō #9; 10–5	East Jūryō #3; 8–7	West Jūryō #1; 9–6	East Maegashira #16; 7–8
2026	West Maegashira #16; 10–5	West Maegashira #11; 5–10	West Maegashira #15; 4–11	West Jūryō #5; 0–5–10	East Makushita #2; Sat out due to injury 0–0–7	West Makushita #42; 2–0–5
Record given as wins–losses–absences Top division champion Top division runner-up Retired Non-participation Jūryō Lower divisions Sanshō key: F=Fighting spirit; O=Outstanding performance; T=Technique Also shown: ★=Kinboshi; P=Playoff(s); Divisions: Makuuchi — Jūryō — Makushita — Sandanme — Jonidan — Jonokuchi Makuuchi ranks: Yokozuna — Ōzeki — Sekiwake — Komusubi — Maegashira

== See also ==
- Glossary of sumo terms
- List of active sumo wrestlers
