= Naruto stable (2017) =

Organization of sumo wrestlers

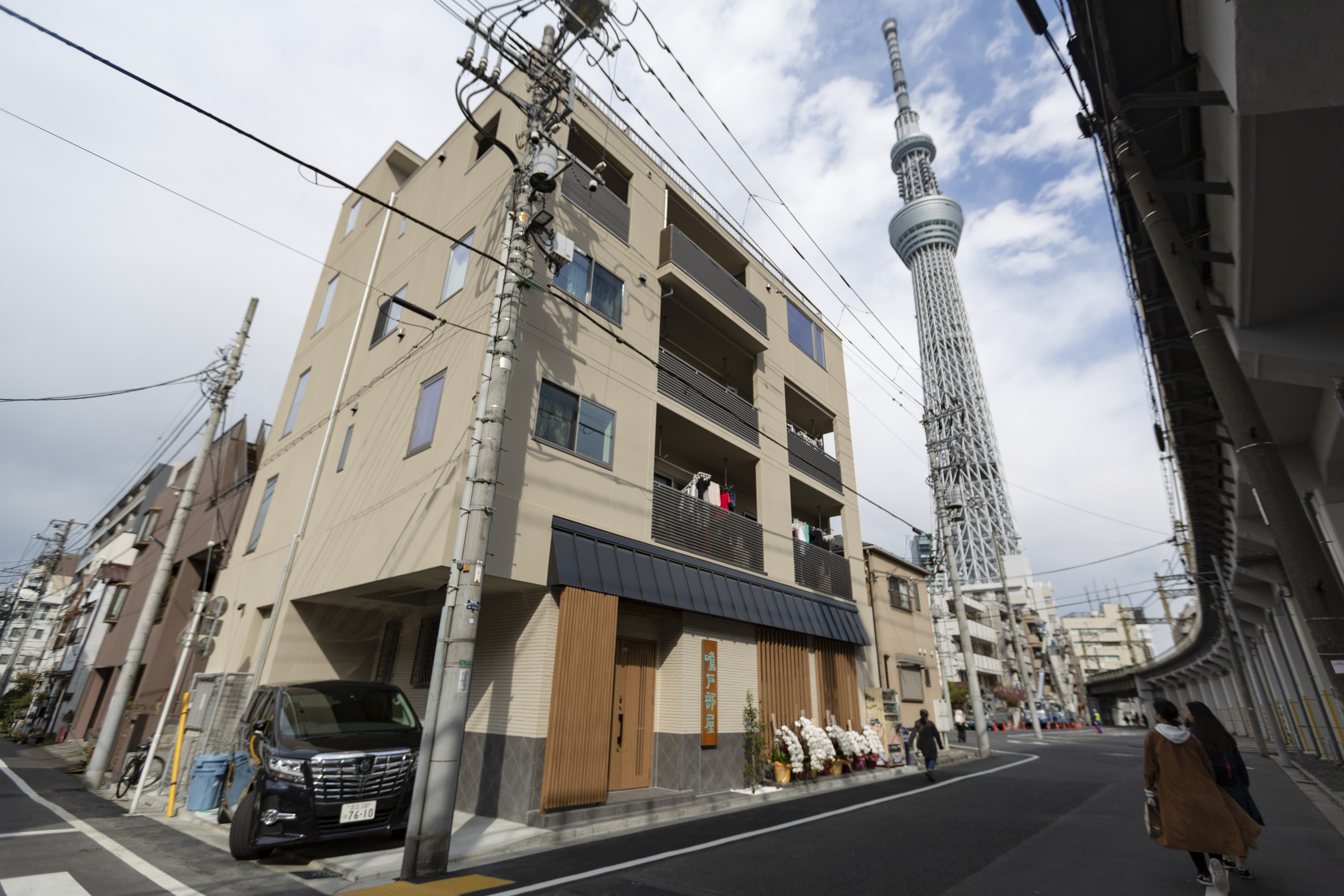
Naruto stable building

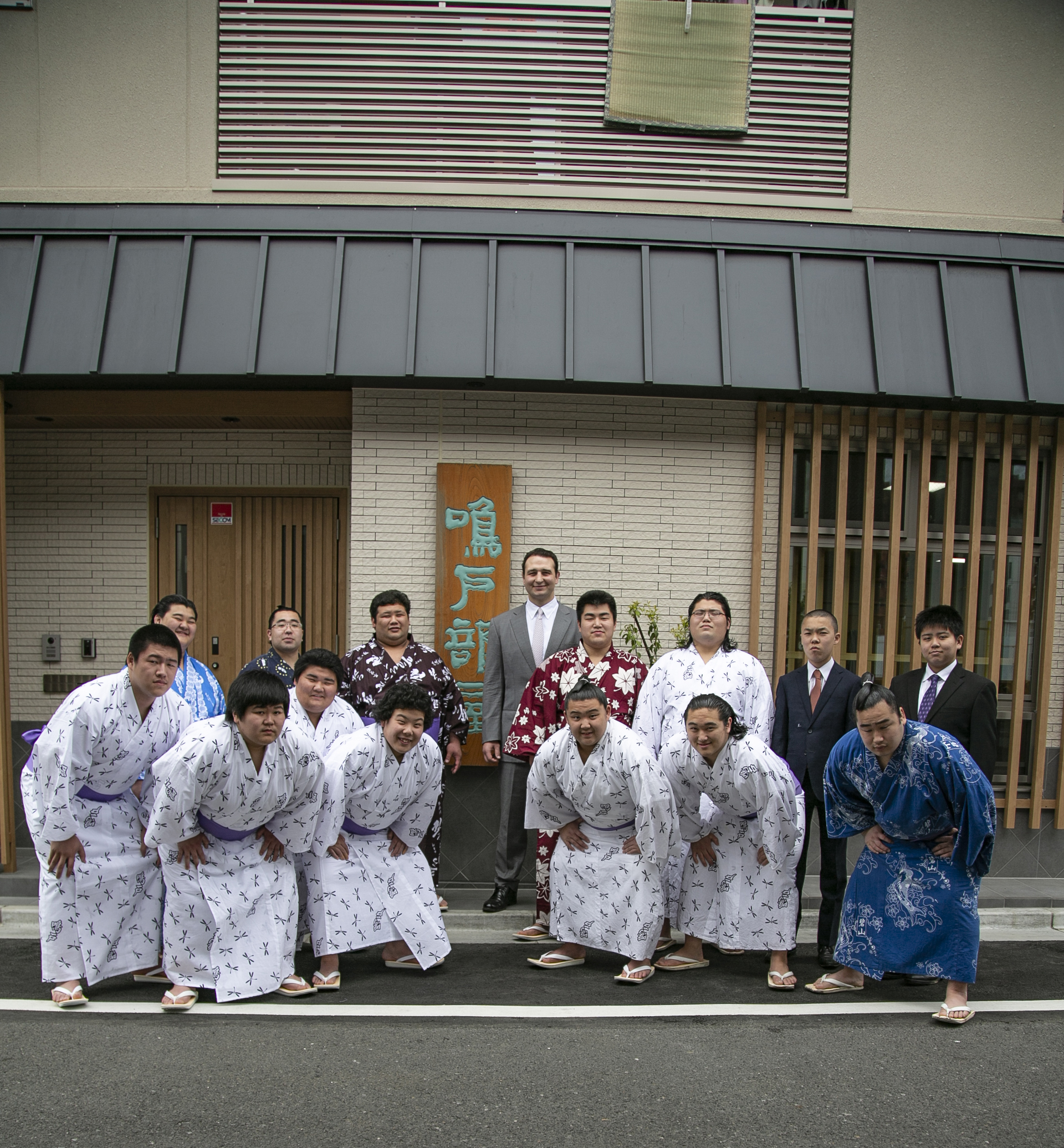
Sumo wrestlers of Naruto stable with owner Naruto Katsunori (formerly Kotoōshū)

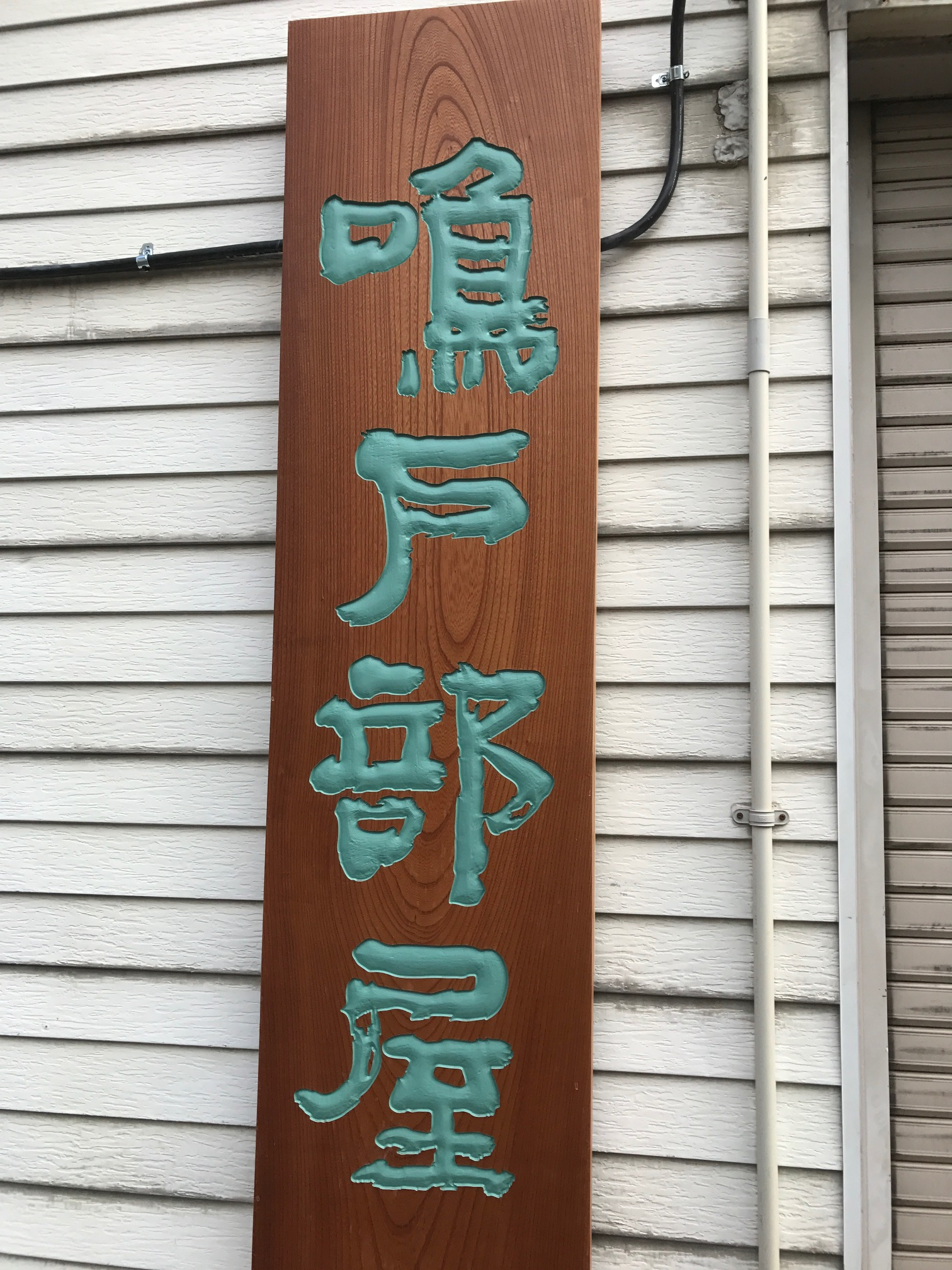
Naruto stable sign

Naruto stable (鳴戸部屋 Naruto-beya) is a stable of sumo wrestlers, part of the Nishonoseki ichimon or group of stables, and founded by former sumo wrestler Kotoōshū Katsunori on 1 April 2017.

As of May 2026, the stable has 13 active wrestlers.

== History ==
Naruto stable was established on 1 April 2017 by the Bulgarian-born former ōzeki Kotoōshū Katsunori, who branched out from Sadogatake stable. It is based in Sumida, Tokyo. One of the stable's early recruits was also a Bulgarian – former junior wrestling champion Ventsislav Katsarov (Torakio Daiki) who retired in April 2019 and returned to Bulgaria. The opening ceremony of the stable was attended by one hundred people including Kotoōshū's former stablemate Kotoshōgiku. Kotoōshū commented, "I want to nurture a wrestler who will eclipse me."

Kotoōshū became a naturalized Japanese citizen two months after his retirement in March 2014. His official name is Andō Karoyan. He is the first European-born stablemaster. He is also only the third foreign-born wrestler to open his own stable after Takamiyama and Musashimaru.

According to a report in May 2018, some wrestlers said that they chose Naruto stable because they had the most information when they searched the internet. Naruto stable is not related to Tagonoura stable which had the same name until 2013.

Naruto suspended one of his wrestlers (reported to be a 20-year-old sandanme-level wrestler) from the January 2019 tournament after it emerged he had choked a junior wrestler as a punishment. This is the first time the Compliance Committee and the Anti-Violence Provisions, which were established in December 2018, were applied. On 19 February 2019 an apology statement was posted on Naruto's official blog and the Twitter page of his stable: "To all of you who always support us. This time, I was very sorry for the trouble that occurred in the stable. We will reflect firmly and take the disposition of the Sumo Association seriously, and will provide guidance and supervision to prevent this from happening in the future."

In 2021 Naruto stable's top wrestler was Ōshōryū, a graduate of Kinki University who has progressed to near the top of the makushita division after debuting in May 2019. However, in September 2021 the stable recruited Nippon Sport Science University's Mongolian Ōshōma, who debuted the following November as a makushita tsukedashi entrant, and reached the jūryō division in May 2022, becoming the stable's first sekitori. In July 2025 Ōshōma became Naruto's first san'yaku-ranked wrestler.

== Ring name conventions ==
Several wrestlers at this stable have taken ring names or shikona which has the character 欧 (ō), meaning Europe, as the first character. This is the middle character of the shikona of the stable's founder, Kotoōshū (琴欧洲).

== Owners ==
- 2017–present: 15th Naruto Katsunori (iin, ōzeki Kotoōshū, born 1983)

== Notable active wrestlers ==
- Ōshōma (best rank komusubi, born 1997)
- Ōshōumi (best rank maegashira, born 2001)

== Referee ==
- Shikimori Komei (jonidan gyōji, real name Komei Hashimoto, born 2003)

== Usher ==
- Kenta (jonidan yobidashi, real name Kenta Maeda, born 2002)

== Hairdresser ==
- Tokoō (fifth class tokoyama, real name Baba Shiido, born 2006)

== Location ==
1 Chome-22-16 Mukōjima, Sumida-ku, Tōkyō-to 130–0003, Japan. It is nearby the Tokyo Skytree.

== See also ==
- List of sumo stables
- List of active sumo wrestlers
- List of past sumo wrestlers
- Glossary of sumo terms
