= Ōshōma Degi =

Mongolian sumo wrestler

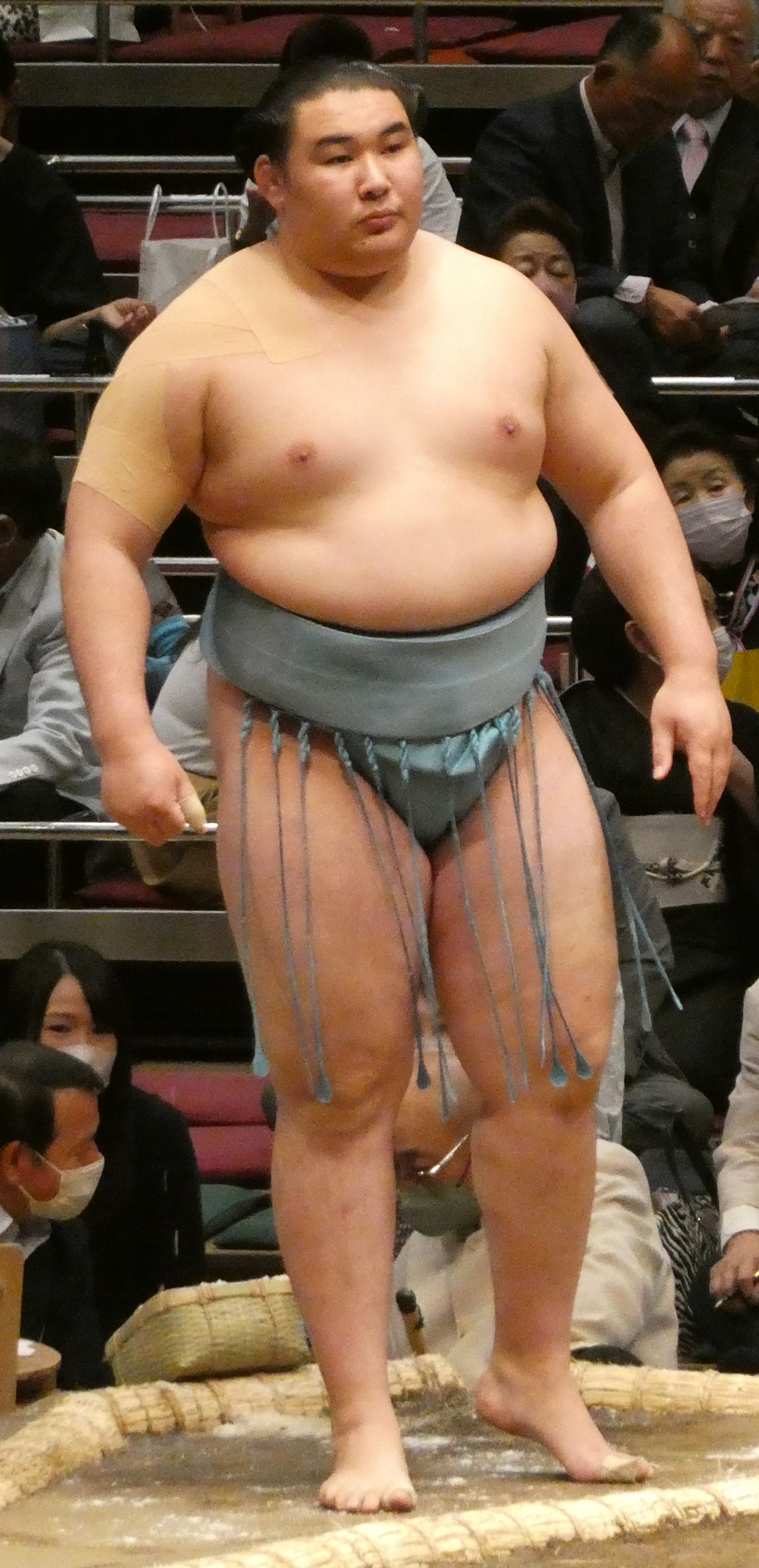
- Degi in 2023

Personal information
- Native name: 欧勝馬 出気
- Born: Pürevsürengiin Delgerbayar; April 9, 1997 (age 29) Töv Province, Mongolia
- Height: 1.90 m (6 ft 3 in)
- Weight: 166 kg (366 lb; 26.1 st)

Sport
- Sport: Sumo
- Rank: see below
- University team: Nippon Sport Science University
- Heya: Naruto
- Debut: November, 2021
- Highest rank: Komusubi 1 (July 2025)
- Championships: 2 (Jūryō, Makushita)
- Special Prizes: Fighting Spirit (1)
- Updated on 30 June 2025

Ōshōma Degi (Japanese: 欧勝馬 出気; born 9 April 1997 as Pürevsürengiin Delgerbayar (Mongolian: Пүрэвсүрэнгийн Дэлгэрбаяр)) is a Mongolian professional sumo wrestler from Töv Province. Wrestling for Naruto stable, he made his professional debut in November 2021, and became sekitori when he reached the jūryō division in July 2022.

== Early life and sumo background ==
Ōshōma was born among the nomadic populations of Mongolia. As a child, he grew up riding horses and taking care of sheep. Ōshōma began wrestling at the age of 14 and at the age of 16, with the help of yokozuna Asashōryū, he came in Japan at NSSU Kashiwa High School in Chiba prefecture along future yokozuna Hōshōryū. There, he won the National High School Championships. He then enrolled at Nippon Sport Science University and joined the university's sumo club. Between his second and third year, he won many tournaments including the National University Championships in Towada and the National Student Championships (openweight division); the National University Championships in Usa, the All-Japan University Championships and the National Student Championships in Kanazawa. In his fourth year, he became "student yokozuna" at the National Student Championships in Towada. That last championship granted him the makushita tsukedashi status. Upon graduation from college, he decided to turn pro and joined Naruto stable because its master, former ōzeki Kotoōshū, mentored him since his college days as training at a sumo stable is mandatory for foreign-born wrestlers to undergo the new apprentice examination.

== Career ==
=== Early career ===
He made his professional debut in September 2021 and was given the shikona, or ring name, "Ōshōma" (欧勝馬) to evoke both his master, with the kanji for Europe (欧), his hopes for success, with the kanji for victory (勝) and his nomadic past with the kanji meaning horse (馬). His shikona first name "Degi" (出喜) was chosen with the kanji for 'move away' (出) as it is phonetically reminiscent of part of his original first name: Delgerbayar.

His makushita tsukedashi allowed him to make his debut at the rank of makushita 15. Ōshōma, however, had to leave his stable as he lost his father in August 2021. Subsequently, and despite being officially listed as a wrestler, Ōshōma was granted a reprieve to attend his father's funeral and was listed as banzukegai in September 2021. Ōshōma shared the same recruit examination session as Kinbōzan, who began his career with the sandanme tsukedashi system. In May 2022, Ōshōma won the makushita championship with a prefect 7–0 record at the rank of makushita 8 with a win on Kitaharima on the last day. He was promoted to jūryō for the following July 2022 tournament, thus becoming the first sekitori raised by Kotoōshū.

During his jūryō debut, Ōshōma had to withdraw from Day 8 of the July 2022 tournament after a COVID-19 outbreak at Naruto stable and in September he broke his thumb during his first match. In November 2022, during his third tournament in jūryō, Ōshōma defeated Daiamami in a playoff on the final day to claim the jūryō championship. In December of the same year, he injured his shoulders during a training session. He subsequently performed poorly for half of 2023, citing recurrences of pain as a factor in his lack of performance. During his training, he often asked for advice from upper-division wrestler and makuuchi veteran Tamawashi, who is also from Mongolia.

In preparation for the September 2023 tournament, he changed the spelling of his shikona first name from 出喜 to 出気, with the same pronunciation, to use the kanji meaning 'energy' (気) to ward off his recent injuries which were penalizing him in his wrestling.

During the March 2024 tournament, Ōshōma (then at the rank of jūryō 4) recorded a tenth victory over Asakōryū on Day 14, creating speculation in the press about a potential promotion to sumo's top division for the first time.

=== Makuuchi promotion ===
Ōshōma's promotion to makuuchi was made official with the unveiling of the May 2024 tournament banzuke. At the press conference at his stable, Ōshōma expressed his regret at having taken 2 years to reach this level of competition after a professional debut marked by injuries. His promotion to makuuchi, however, makes Ōshōma the twenty-ninth Mongolian wrestler to reach the division for the first time, the latest being Mitoryū in 2022.

== Personal life ==
Ōshōma has been married since December 2024 to an air hostess from Aichi prefecture, after a one-and-a-half-year relationship. In February 2025, he revealed that he was the father of a daughter born on January 9 of the same year.

== Career record ==
Ōshōma Degi
Year	January Hatsu basho, Tokyo	March Haru basho, Osaka	May Natsu basho, Tokyo	July Nagoya basho, Nagoya	September Aki basho, Tokyo	November Kyūshū basho, Fukuoka
2021	x	x	x	x	x	Makushita tsukedashi #15; 4–3
2022	East Makushita #12; 5–2	West Makushita #4; 3–4	East Makushita #8; 7–0; Champion	East Jūryō #13; 5–3–7	East Jūryō #13; 8–7	West Jūryō #12; 11–4–P; Champion
2023	West Jūryō #3; 7–8	West Jūryō #4; 8–7	East Jūryō #4; 7–8	East Jūryō #4; 7–8	East Jūryō #4; 8–7	West Jūryō #3; 6–9
2024	West Jūryō #5; 8–7	West Jūryō #4; 11–4	West Maegashira #14; 10–5; F	East Maegashira #9; 7–8	West Maegashira #9; 10–5	West Maegashira #4; 4–11
2025	West Maegashira #9; 8–7	West Maegashira #8; 9–6	East Maegashira #6; 10–5	East Komusubi #1; 3–12	West Maegashira #7; 9–6	West Maegashira #4; 4–11
2026	East Maegashira #7; 7–8	East Maegashira #7; 6–9	East Maegashira #8; 8–7	West Maegashira #5; 7–8	West Maegashira #5; 6–9	East Maegashira #9 –
Record given as wins–losses–absences Top division champion Top division runner-up Retired Lower divisions Non-participation Sanshō key: F=Fighting spirit; O=Outstanding performance; T=Technique Also shown: ★=Kinboshi; P=Playoff(s); Divisions: Makuuchi — Jūryō — Makushita — Sandanme — Jonidan — Jonokuchi Makuuchi ranks: Yokozuna — Ōzeki — Sekiwake — Komusubi — Maegashira

== See also ==
- Glossary of sumo terms
- List of active sumo wrestlers
- List of Mongolian sumo wrestlers
- List of non-Japanese sumo wrestlers
- List of active special prize winners
- List of sumo second division champions
- List of komusubi
