= Ōikari Tsuyoshi =

Japanese sumo wrestler

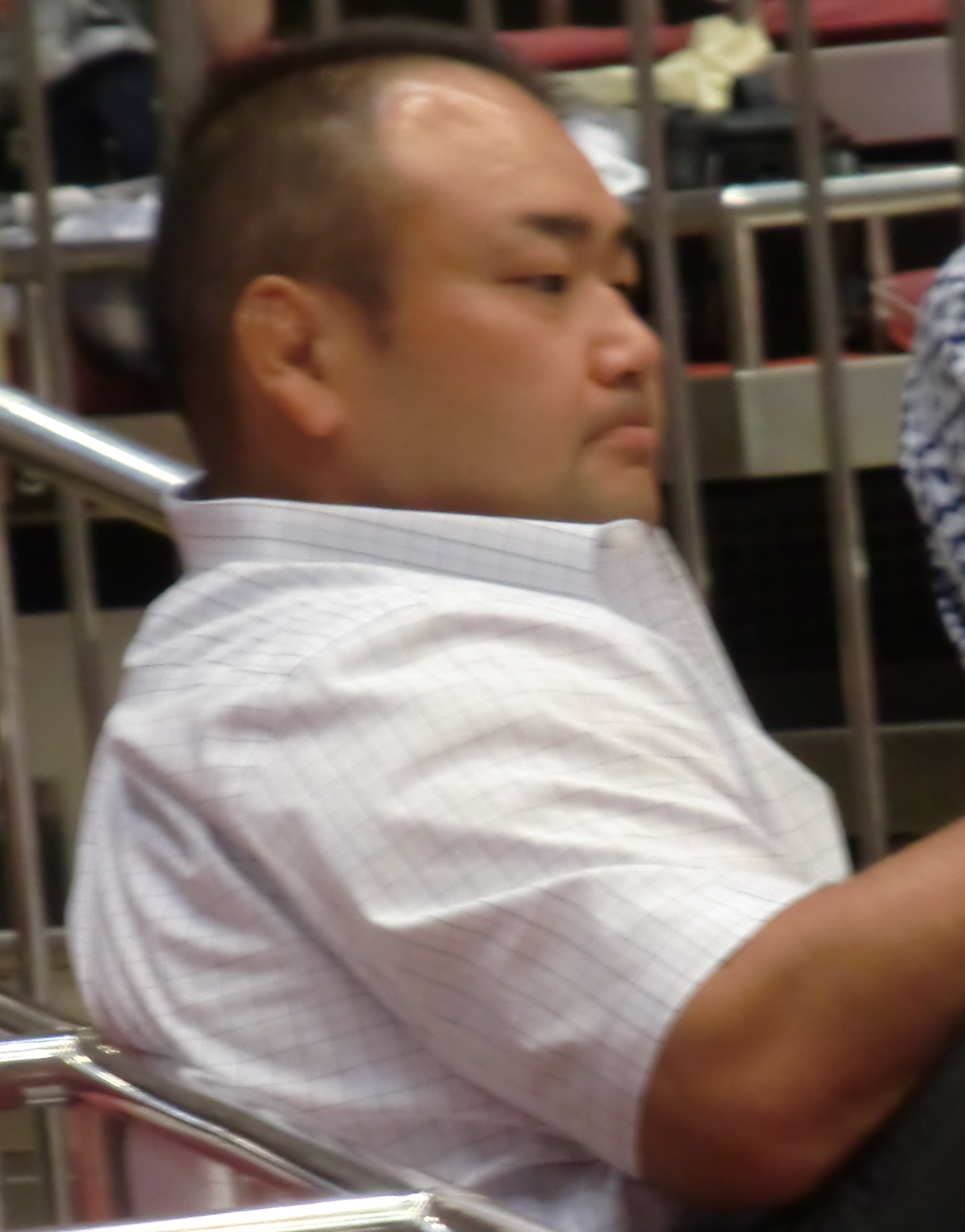

Personal information
- Native name: 大碇 剛
- Born: Tsuyoshi Saito; 16 June 1972 (age 54) Nishikyō-ku, Kyoto, Japan
- Height: 1.77 m (5 ft 9 1/2 in)
- Weight: 131 kg (289 lb)

Sport
- Sport: Sumo
- Retired: November 2004
- Heya: Isenoumi
- Record: 356–336–57
- Debut: March 1995
- Highest rank: Maegashira 11 (March, 2000)
- Elder name: Kabutoyama
- Championships: 2 (Jūryō)
- Updated on Sep. 2012

Ōikari Tsuyoshi (born 16 June 1972 as Tsuyoshi Saito) is a former sumo wrestler from Nishikyō, Kyoto, Japan. He made his professional debut in March 1995, and reached the top division in November 1998. His highest rank was maegashira 11. He retired in November 2004, and as of 2016 he is an elder in the Japan Sumo Association under the name Kabutoyama.

== Career ==
He was an amateur sumo wrestler at Doshisha University and upon turning professional in 1995 was given makushita tsukedashi status, allowing him to begin in the third makushita division. He joined Isenoumi stable, where another Doshisha University graduate, Tosanoumi, had joined the previous year. He was given the shikona of Ōikari (literally "large anchor") to potentially evoke the former Meiji era Ōzeki, Ōikari Montarō, who also wrestled in an older incarnation of Isenoumi stable. He was promoted to the jūryō division in May 1997, becoming the first sekitori from Kyoto Prefecture since the retirement of Daimonji in July 1973, and he was to win two jūryō division championships or yūshō in 1998 and 2001. He first reached the top makuuchi division in November 1998 but was demoted after only one tournament. He had two further stints the top division, a two tournament run in January and March 2000, and four tournaments from January until July 2002. His highest rank was maegashira 11 and he had an overall win/loss record in makuuchi of 45–60. He was demoted back to the makushita division in September 2004 and announced his retirement after the following tournament in November.

== Retirement from sumo ==
Ōikari's danpatsu-shiki or official retirement ceremony was held in the ground floor of the Ryōgoku Kokugikan on May 28, 2005, with 230 invited guests including former ōzeki Musōyama. He has remained in sumo as a coach at Isenoumi stable under the elder name of Kabutoyama Oyakata. He has worked as a trainer and instructor in the sumo school for new recruits.

== Fighting style ==
Ōikari was a pusher/thruster (tsuki/oshi) whose favourite techniques were oshi dashi (push out), tsuki otoshi (thrust over) and hiki otoshi (pull down).

== Personal life ==
Ōikari was married in March 2004. His elder son Seigō Saito (born 2005) joined Isenoumi stable in January 2023 under the shikona of Wakaikari and reached the jūryō division in November 2024. Upon his promotion to the top division in July 2025 he changed his ring name to Fujinokawa.

Ōikari's younger son, Chūgō Saito (born 2006), won a gold medal in Junior Sumo World Championships in 2023 as part of the Japan team. After a successful amateur career, Chūgō qualified as a sandanme tsukedashi, becoming the first professional sumo recruit to be able to access the revised form of this status since its reform in September 2023. Chūgō turned professional in December 2024, joining Isenoumi stable. After passing sumo's physical examination the following month it was decided that Chūgō's shikona would be Ikarigata, taking the kanji characters from both his father and brother.

== Career record ==
Ōikari Tsuyoshi
| Year | January Hatsu basho, Tokyo | March Haru basho, Osaka | May Natsu basho, Tokyo | July Nagoya basho, Nagoya | September Aki basho, Tokyo | November Kyūshū basho, Fukuoka |
|---|---|---|---|---|---|---|
| 1995 | x | Makushita tsukedashi #60; 6–1 | East Makushita #31; 3–4 | West Makushita #46; 6–1 | East Makushita #21; 3–4 | West Makushita #28; 4–3 |
| 1996 | West Makushita #20; 5–2 | East Makushita #10; 5–2 | East Makushita #5; 5–2 | East Makushita #1; 3–4 | West Makushita #5; 3–4 | West Makushita #9; 5–2 |
| 1997 | East Makushita #3; 5–2 | West Makushita #1; 6–1–P | East Jūryō #12; 7–8 | West Jūryō #13; 9–6 | West Jūryō #7; 2–3–10 | West Makushita #2; Sat out due to injury 0–0–7 |
| 1998 | West Makushita #2; 4–3 | West Jūryō #13; 8–7 | West Jūryō #9; 10–5–PP; Champion | West Jūryō #2; 8–7 | West Jūryō #1; 9–6 | West Maegashira #15; 5–10 |
| 1999 | East Jūryō #4; 7–8 | West Jūryō #5; 8–7 | East Jūryō #4; 7–8 | East Jūryō #6; 8–7 | West Jūryō #4; 9–6 | East Jūryō #2; 11–4–P |
| 2000 | West Maegashira #13; 8–7 | East Maegashira #11; 5–10 | East Jūryō #1; 7–8 | East Jūryō #2; 8–7 | West Jūryō #1; 7–8 | West Jūryō #2; 5–10 |
| 2001 | East Jūryō #7; 5–8–2 | East Jūryō #11; Sat out due to injury 0–0–15 | East Jūryō #11; 8–7 | East Jūryō #10; 9–6–P | West Jūryō #6; 9–6 | East Jūryō #3; 11–4; Champion |
| 2002 | West Maegashira #11; 7–8 | West Maegashira #12; 7–8 | East Maegashira #13; 6–9 | East Maegashira #15; 7–8 | West Jūryō #2; 4–11 | East Jūryō #9; 10–5 |
| 2003 | East Jūryō #3; 6–9 | West Jūryō #5; 5–2–8 | West Jūryō #9; 7–8 | East Jūryō #10; Sat out due to injury 0–0–15 | East Jūryō #10; 7–8 | West Jūryō #11; 11–4 |
| 2004 | East Jūryō #4; 9–6 | East Jūryō #1; 6–9 | West Jūryō #4; 3–12 | West Jūryō #10; 3–12 | East Makushita #6; 2–5 | West Makushita #17; Retired; 3–4 |
Record given as wins–losses–absences Top division champion Top division runner-up Retired Lower divisions Non-participation Sanshō key: F=Fighting spirit; O=Outstanding performance; T=Technique Also shown: ★=Kinboshi; P=Playoff(s); Divisions: Makuuchi — Jūryō — Makushita — Sandanme — Jonidan — Jonokuchi Makuuchi ranks: Yokozuna — Ōzeki — Sekiwake — Komusubi — Maegashira

== See also ==
- List of sumo tournament second division champions
- Glossary of sumo terms
- List of past sumo wrestlers
- List of sumo elders
