= Ōikari Montarō =

Japanese sumo wrestler

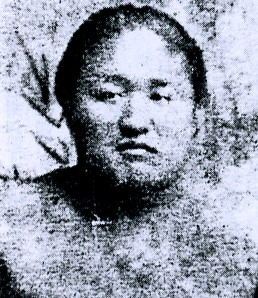

Personal information
- Native name: 大碇 紋太郎
- Born: Montarō Yoshida; February 22, 1869 Chita District, Owari Province, Japan
- Died: January 27, 1930 (aged 60)
- Height: 1.77 m (5 ft 9 1/2 in)
- Weight: 116 kg (256 lb)

Sport
- Sport: Sumo
- Retired: January, 1898
- Heya: Yamawake → Isenoumi
- Record: 69-48-16-5 draws/5 holds
- Debut: May, 1885
- Highest rank: Ōzeki (June, 1895)
- Updated on August, 2023

Ōikari Montarō (大碇 紋太郎; February 22, 1869 – January 27, 1930) was a Japanese professional sumo wrestler from Chita District, Owari Province (now Handa, Aichi Prefecture). Wrestling for the Tokyo-based Sumo Association, he made his debut in May 1885 at Isenoumi stable. He reached the makuuchi division in January 1893 and reached the rank of ōzeki in 1895.

Because he later wrestled for the Kyoto-based Sumo Association, he was awarded a yokozuna license by the Gōjō family in April 1899. However, since this yokozuna license was not issued by the Yoshida family, he is not recognized by the Japan Sumo Association as being on the list of official yokozuna. Although he retired from the Tokyo Sumo Association in 1898, his final retirement date is unknown.

== History ==
Before his professional career, Ōikari changed his name several times. One of his earliest names was Yoshida Montarō, which is accepted as his birth name, although some theories give his birth name as Takeuchi Montarō before he was adopted by a man named Yoshida Kahei. Later Ōikari also changed his name to Hibi Montarō after he was adopted by a man named Hibi Chosaburō. In 1884, he joined Yamawake stable but eventually left to join Isenoumi stable.

He rose steadily up the rankings and made his debut in san'yaku in 1894, where he put in a fine performance in the May tournament, being second only to tournament champion Asashio. This performance saw him promoted directly to the rank of sekiwake, where, following a second good performance, he was promoted to the rank of ōzeki. Ōikari was known for his tsuki and oshi techniques nicknamed dai ikari (大怒り), meaning 'great anger'. His skills were often highlighted by sports specialists and he received a lot of encouragement during this period. Ōikari held his rank for two tournaments, winning a majority of matches each time. For some obscure reason, however, he was demoted back to the rank of sekiwake for the June 1896 tournament. Angered, Ōikari deserted the Tokyo Sumo Association after the May 1896 tournament. He went to Kyoto and was welcomed by the local officials, being allowed to start a tournament in Kyoto directly at the rank of ōzeki because the Kyoto Sumo Association wanted to showcase him to promote its tournaments. In January 1898, he was persuaded by Master Ikazuchi (former yokozuna Umegatani I) to return to the Tokyo association, where he made his comeback as a maegashira. After a serious setback at his return tournament, Ōikari however decided to retire from the Tokyo Association for good and returned to Kyoto.

In Kyoto, he continued his ōzeki career with greater success. In April 1899, the Gōjō family decided to award him a yokozuna licence in recognition of his performances. He held the rank for more than 10 years. In 1910, he led a delegation of wrestlers from Kyoto to the Japan–British Exhibition in London, where he performed a ring entering ceremony. The event was the first full scale presentation of a sumo performance oversea. After the event, Ōikari and his group toured across Europe and in North America. The tour finally ended up in South America, more specifically in Argentina where Ōikari eventually stayed as his companions returned to Japan. Although the public in Kyoto were still awaiting his return, Ōikari gave his last news as he left for Venezuela. Although he chose to stay, Ōikari lost the job he had found and became a coolie worker. He ended his days as a dockyard worker in Chile.

It is often theorized that Ōikari never returned to Japan after his world tour, but author Masaru Nishi, who wrote Ōikari's biography, reports that Hajime Kawakami, who was sentenced to prison in 1933 for joining the Japanese Communist Party, saw an old man who resembled Ōikari at Tokyo's Kosuge Prison and would often listen to his stories and record them in his diary. The loss of the Kyoto-based sumo association's sole yokozuna is cited as the latest event to precipitate the association's downfall after a long decline since the Meiji Restoration.

In 2022, members of the local Tokai sumo history association discovered an obituary mentioning Ōikari (under his real name of Hibi Montarō) in the February 1930 issue of the Nippaku Shimbun, the second oldest Japanese newspaper in Brazil.

Ōikari was nicknamed okame (おかめ), after the traditional Japanese mask. In 1995, the Ōikari shikona, or ring name, was inherited by Ōikari Tsuyoshi, a wrestler from the current incarnation of Isenoumi stable.

== Tokyo career record ==
Ōikari Montarō
-	Spring	Summer
1889	Unknown	West Jūryō #8; 4–4
1890	West Jūryō #7; 3–4; 1d	Unknown
1891	West Jūryō #5; 2–5; 1d	West Jūryō #8; 6–3; 1h
1892	West Jūryō #2; 6–4	East Jūryō #3; 6–3
1893	East Maegashira #10; 4–2–2; 2h	East Maegashira #7; 7–2–1
1894	West Maegashira #2; 5–2–2; 1h	West Komusubi #1; 7–0–1; 1d-1h
1895	West Sekiwake #1; 7–2–1	West Ōzeki #1; 4–1–4; 1d
1896	West Haridashi Ōzeki; 5–3–2	West Haridashi Sekiwake; 2–6–1; 1d
1897	Unknown	Unknown
1898	East Haridashi Maegashira; Retired; 1–7–2	x
Record given as win-loss-absent Top Division Champion Retired Lower Divisions Key: d=Draw(s) (引分); h=Hold(s) (預り); nr=no result recorded Divisions: Makuuchi — Jūryō — Makushita — Sandanme — Jonidan — Jonokuchi Makuuchi ranks: Yokozuna (not ranked as such on banzuke until 1890); Ōzeki — Sekiwake — Komusubi — Maegashira

*Championships for the best record in a tournament were not recognized or awarded before the 1909 summer tournament and the above championships that are labelled "unofficial" are historically conferred. For more information see yūshō.

== See also ==
- Glossary of sumo terms
- List of past sumo wrestlers
- List of ōzeki
- Issei

== Sources ==
=== Further reading ===
- "『横綱「大碇」謎の最期河上肇の自伝に…』". Asahi Shimbun (21 November 2008): 35.
