= Mitoizumi Masayuki =

Japanese sumo wrestler (born 1962)

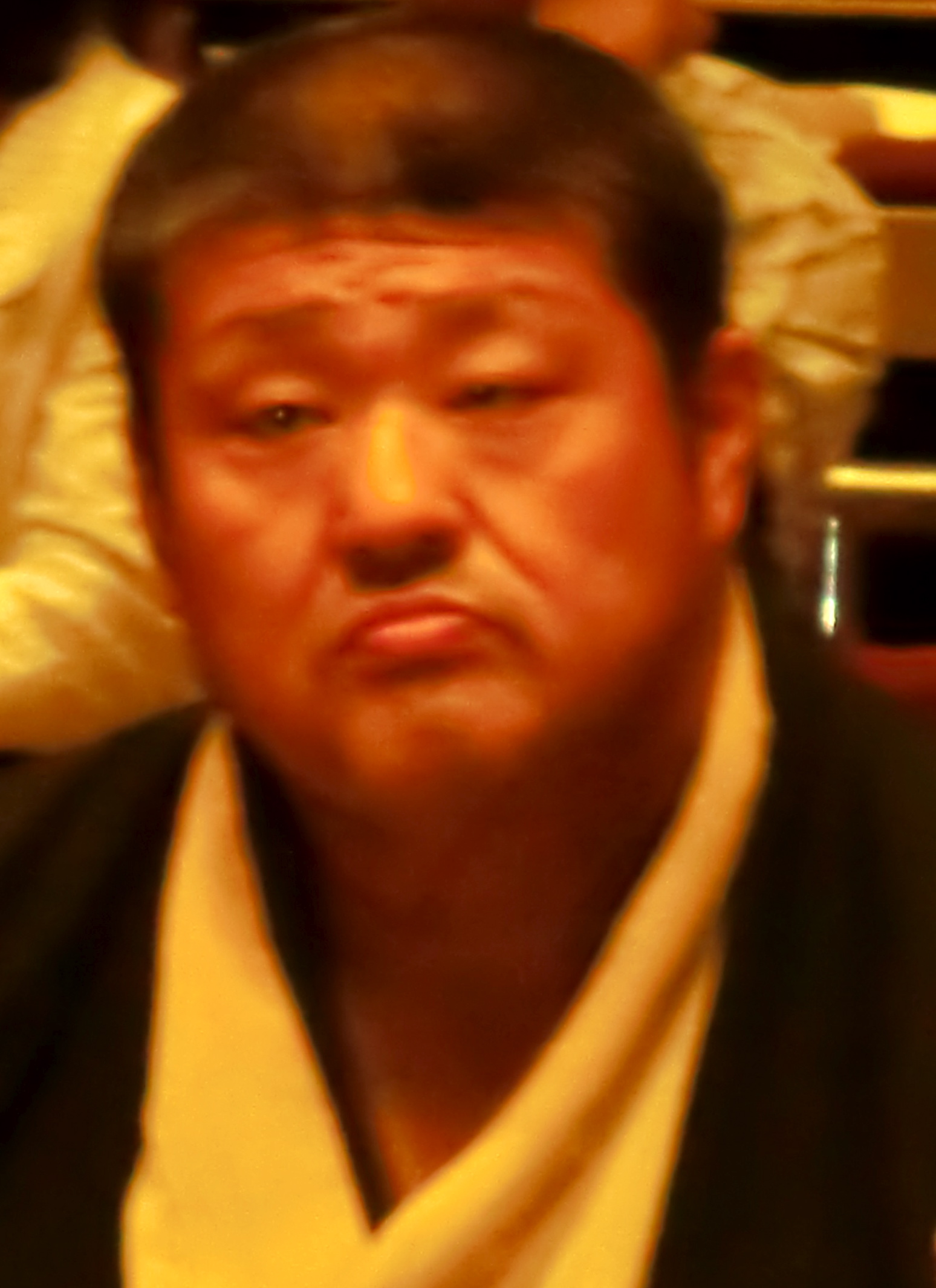

Personal information
- Native name: 水戸泉 眞幸
- Born: Masato Koizumi; 2 September 1962 (age 64) Mito, Ibaraki
- Height: 1.94 m (6 ft 4 1/2 in)
- Weight: 183 kg (403 lb)

Sport
- Sport: Sumo
- Retired: September, 2000
- Heya: Takasago
- Record: 807-766-162
- Debut: March, 1978
- Highest rank: Sekiwake (September, 1986)
- Elder name: Nishikido
- Championships: 1 (Makuuchi); 1 (Jūryō); 1 (Makushita)
- Special Prizes: Outstanding Performance (1); Fighting Spirit (6)
- Updated on August 2007

Mitoizumi Masayuki (born 2 September 1962 as Masato Koizumi) is a former sumo wrestler from Mito, Ibaraki, Japan. His professional career spanned 22 years, from 1978 until 2000. The highest rank he reached was sekiwake. He won over 800 career bouts and took the yūshō or championship in the top makuuchi division in 1992. Mitoizumi was nicknamed the "Salt Shaker", due to his habit of throwing enormous quantities of purifying salt onto the ring (dohyō) during the pre-match preliminaries. He is now a coach, and is known as Nishikido Oyakata.

== Career ==
Mitoizumi was discovered by Takamiyama, a famous Hawaiian born sumo wrestler, who met the 16-year-old and his brother at a department store where Takamiyama was making a personal appearance. He was persuaded to join Takasago stable and made his professional debut in March 1978. Initially fighting under his own surname of Koizumi, he switched to the shikona of Mitoizumi (reference to his birthplace) in 1981. He was troubled early in his career by illness and in 1982 he seriously injured his knee and was hospitalised for four months, causing him to miss tournaments and plunge down the rankings. This was just one of many injuries he would have to battle with over the course of his long career.

He made the breakthrough to the salaried sekitori ranks in May 1984 when he reached the jūryō division, in the same tournament in which Takamiyama announced his retirement. Mitoizumi was promoted to the top makuuchi division just two tournaments later in September 1984. However, he was to suffer more misfortune. Just before the May 1985 tournament he was involved in a motor accident, receiving cuts to his face; and was forced to sit out part of the tournament. After the next tournament, he was demoted back to jūryō. In September 1986, after he had managed to return to the top division and reach a new highest rank of sekiwake, he injured his knee again in a bout with ōzeki Ōnokuni and returned to the second division once more. It took him until January 1988 to fight his way back to the top division, but this time he was to remain there for the next eleven years.

Mitoizumi was ranked at sekiwake on several more occasions and won seven special prizes, but the highlight of his career came in July 1992, when he took the top division tournament championship for the only time. Ranked at maegashira 1, he took advantage of the absence of the top ranked wrestler at the time, ōzeki Akebono, and clinched the championship on the 14th day with a win over Takanonami. He finished on 13-2, two wins ahead of his nearest challengers Kirishima and Musashimaru.

Mitoizumi was never able to reach those heights again, but after his final appearance in the san'yaku ranks in November 1992 he remained in the top division until March 1999. He carried on fighting in the jūryō division until September 2000, when he finally announced his retirement at the age of 38, rather than be demoted to the third makushita division. He had been an active wrestler for more than 22 years. His tally of 807 career wins is the twelfth highest in sumo history. He never earned any kinboshi, as all his victories over yokozuna came when he was fighting at komusubi or sekiwake rank.

Mitoizumi's nickname of the "Salt Shaker" was given to him by British sumo fans who followed his matches on Channel 4 and in the exhibition at the Royal Albert Hall in 1991. It referred to his habit during the pre-match rituals (but only on the final throw) of grabbing a huge handful of purifying salt and flinging it high into the air. After his retirement his routine was taken up by maegashira Kitazakura.

== Retirement from sumo ==
Mitoizumi's official retirement ceremony (danpatsu-shiki) took place on 9 June 2001, with a record 470 patrons, wrestlers and coaches taking part in the hair-cutting ritual. He remained in the sumo world as a coach at Takasago stable under the elder name Nishikido Oyakata and he effectively led it during the illness of its head, former komusubi Fujinishiki. However, he lost out on the chance to succeed him, due to personal problems with his fiancée from whom he eventually split. Instead, control of Takasago stable passed to former ōzeki Asashio who merged it with Wakamatsu stable. As a result, in December 2002 Mitoizumi instead opened up his own training stable, or heya, Nishikido stable. The stable did not produce a sekitori until November 2017 when Mitoryū was promoted to jūryō. Unusually for the head of a stable, he remained single for many years, before marrying a soprano, Yukiko Ono, in February 2016. Nishikido also works as a judge of tournament bouts.

== Fighting style ==
Mitoizumi was not noted as a technician, and never won a Technique prize. His most common winning kimarite was overwhelmingly yori-kiri, a straightforward force out, which accounted for over half of his victories at sekitori level. However, due to his height and strength he also regularly employed kimedashi, or arm barring force out, a technique seldom seen today.

== Personal life ==
Mitoizumi's younger brother, Umenosato, was also a sumo wrestler at Takasago stable. He fought for 21 years from 1980 to 2001 but only made the jūryō division on one occasion in July 1993. He now works at Nishikido stable as a manager.

Mitoizumi is also known for his passion for painting, a hobby he has nurtured since an early age. Having first begun practicing by copying works by Osamu Tezuka, Tetsuya Chiba and Akio Chiba, he had initially envisaged a career as a mangaka. Having finally decided to become a professional wrestler, he was nevertheless introduced to oil painting by the wife of the then-master Takasago (former komusubi Fujinishiki).

== Career record ==
Mitoizumi Masayuki
Year	January Hatsu basho, Tokyo	March Haru basho, Osaka	May Natsu basho, Tokyo	July Nagoya basho, Nagoya	September Aki basho, Tokyo	November Kyūshū basho, Fukuoka
1978	x	(Maezumo)	West Jonokuchi #32; 5–1–1	East Jonidan #74; 4–3	East Jonidan #55; 3–4	West Jonidan #63; 4–3
1979	West Jonidan #46; 4–3	East Jonidan #24; 4–3	West Jonidan #10; 2–5	East Jonidan #35; 5–2	East Sandanme #88; 5–2	West Sandanme #57; 4–3
1980	West Sandanme #43; 5–2	East Sandanme #11; 1–1–5	West Sandanme #41; 3–4	West Sandanme #53; 5–2	West Sandanme #21; Sat out due to injury 0–0–7	West Sandanme #60; Sat out due to injury 0–0–7
1981	West Jonidan #14; 5–2	West Sandanme #70; Sat out due to injury 0–0–7	West Jonidan #31; 6–1	West Sandanme #61; 4–3	West Sandanme #47; 7–0–P	East Makushita #43; 4–3
1982	East Makushita #29; 6–1	West Makushita #5; 4–3	West Makushita #2; 2–5	West Makushita #12; 3–4	West Makushita #23; 3–4	East Makushita #32; 5–1–1
1983	East Makushita #18; Sat out due to injury 0–0–7	East Makushita #53; Sat out due to injury 0–0–7	East Sandanme #34; 6–1	East Makushita #51; 7–0–P	West Makushita #4; 3–4	East Makushita #12; 5–2
1984	East Makushita #5; 4–3	East Makushita #1; 7–0; Champion	West Jūryō #8; 9–6	East Jūryō #3; 11–4	West Maegashira #11; 7–8	East Maegashira #13; 8–7
1985	East Maegashira #10; 11–4; F	West Maegashira #1; 7–8	East Maegashira #2; 2–5–8	West Maegashira #14; 3–12	West Jūryō #8; 8–4–3	West Jūryō #6; 8–7
1986	East Jūryō #4; 11–4–P; Champion	West Maegashira #12; 12–3; F	West Maegashira #1; 6–9	East Maegashira #6; 10–5; F	West Sekiwake #1; 1–3–11	West Maegashira #7; Sat out due to injury 0–0–15
1987	West Maegashira #7; Sat out due to injury 0–0–15	West Jūryō #3; 6–9	West Jūryō #6; 8–7	West Jūryō #5; 5–10	East Jūryō #11; 10–5	West Jūryō #4; 9–6
1988	West Jūryō #2; 10–5	East Maegashira #13; 9–6	East Maegashira #8; 9–6; F	East Maegashira #2; 8–7	West Komusubi #1; 10–5; O	East Komusubi #1; 0–2–13
1989	West Maegashira #8; Sat out due to injury 0–0–15	West Maegashira #8; 9–6	East Maegashira #2; 8–7	West Komusubi #1; 7–8	West Maegashira #1; 9–6	East Komusubi #1; 11–4; F
1990	East Sekiwake #1; 7–8	East Komusubi #1; 2–9–4	East Maegashira #7; 8–7	West Maegashira #3; 6–9	East Maegashira #7; 5–10	East Maegashira #14; 8–7
1991	East Maegashira #11; 7–8	West Maegashira #13; 8–7	West Maegashira #12; 8–7	East Maegashira #9; 10–5	East Maegashira #2; 8–7	East Maegashira #2; 8–7
1992	East Maegashira #1; 8–7	West Komusubi #2; 8–7	West Komusubi #1; 7–8	West Maegashira #1; 13–2; F	West Sekiwake #2; 8–7	West Sekiwake #2; 1–12–2
1993	West Maegashira #10; 8–7	West Maegashira #7; 4–11	East Maegashira #14; 10–5	West Maegashira #5; 9–6	West Maegashira #1; 4–10–1	East Maegashira #11; Sat out due to injury 0–0–15
1994	East Maegashira #11; 8–7	West Maegashira #6; 4–11	East Maegashira #14; 8–7	East Maegashira #13; 8–7	West Maegashira #11; 7–8	West Maegashira #14; 8–7
1995	East Maegashira #13; 7–8	West Maegashira #15; 9–6	East Maegashira #7; 5–10	East Maegashira #13; 8–7	East Maegashira #9; 8–7	West Maegashira #2; 8–7
1996	West Maegashira #1; 3–12	East Maegashira #8; 7–8	East Maegashira #10; 9–6	West Maegashira #3; 4–11	East Maegashira #8; 8–7	West Maegashira #2; 4–11
1997	East Maegashira #8; 7–8	East Maegashira #10; 8–7	East Maegashira #5; 4–11	East Maegashira #10; 8–7	East Maegashira #6; 5–10	East Maegashira #11; 8–7
1998	East Maegashira #10; 6–9	West Maegashira #14; 9–6	East Maegashira #10; 6–9	East Maegashira #13; 8–7	East Maegashira #8; 5–10	West Maegashira #14; 8–7
1999	West Maegashira #11; 8–7	East Maegashira #10; 5–10	East Jūryō #1; 5–10	East Jūryō #7; 9–6	East Jūryō #4; 6–9	West Jūryō #6; 8–7
2000	East Jūryō #4; 8–7	West Jūryō #3; 5–9–1	West Jūryō #7; Sat out due to injury 0–0–15	West Jūryō #7; 5–8–2	West Jūryō #11; Retired; 1–12	x
Record given as wins–losses–absences Top division champion Top division runner-up Retired Lower divisions Non-participation Sanshō key: F=Fighting spirit; O=Outstanding performance; T=Technique Also shown: ★=Kinboshi; P=Playoff(s); Divisions: Makuuchi — Jūryō — Makushita — Sandanme — Jonidan — Jonokuchi Makuuchi ranks: Yokozuna — Ōzeki — Sekiwake — Komusubi — Maegashira

== See also ==
- Glossary of sumo terms
- List of past sumo wrestlers
- List of sumo elders
- List of sumo tournament top division champions
- List of sumo tournament top division runners-up
- List of sekiwake
