= Kadoban =

Kadoban (角番) is a Japanese term commonly interpreted to mean "in a corner". It may refer to:

- In the board game Go, a game whose loss may alter a player's handicap or decide a match: see Professional go handicaps
- In the sport of sumo, facing demotion from the rank of ōzeki: see Makuuchi
