= Daimonji Kenji =

Sumo wrestler

Personal information
- Native name: 大文字 研二
- Born: Kenji Tamura; 21 February 1940 (age 86) Shimogyō-ku, Kyōto, Japan
- Height: 1.82 m (5 ft 11 1/2 in)
- Weight: 106 kg (234 lb)

Sport
- Sport: Sumo
- Retired: July, 1973
- Heya: Nakamura → Nishonoseki
- Record: 598-579-15-1 (draw)
- Debut: March, 1956
- Highest rank: Maegashira 5 (January, 1970)
- Elder name: Nishiiwa
- Championships: 1 (Jūryō); 1 (Jonidan)
- Updated on June 2020

Daimonji Kenji (born 21 February 1940 as Kenji Tamura) is a former sumo wrestler from Kyōto, Japan. He made his professional debut in March 1956 and reached the top division in November 1966. His highest rank was maegashira 5. Upon retirement from active competition he became an elder in the Japan Sumo Association, under the name Nishiiwa. He coached at Taihō/Ōtake stable, until reaching the Sumo Association's mandatory retirement age of 65 in February 2005.

== Career record ==
- The Kyushu tournament was first held in 1957, and the Nagoya tournament in 1958.

Daimonji Kenji
Year	January Hatsu basho, Tokyo	March Haru basho, Osaka	May Natsu basho, Tokyo	July Nagoya basho, Nagoya	September Aki basho, Tokyo	November Kyūshū basho, Fukuoka
1956	x	(Maezumo)	West Jonokuchi #21; 5–3	Not held	West Jonidan #81; 6–2	Not held
1957	West Jonidan #36; 8–0; Champion	West Sandanme #71; 7–1–P	West Sandanme #29; 5–3	Not held	West Sandanme #11; 5–3	West Makushita #78; 1–1–6
1958	West Sandanme #10; 2–6	East Sandanme #17; 6–2	East Makushita #82; 4–4	East Makushita #78; 5–3	East Makushita #69; 2–6	East Sandanme #3; 6–2
1959	West Makushita #67; 4–4	East Makushita #65; 4–4	West Makushita #64; 4–4	East Makushita #61; 5–3	East Makushita #59; 4–4	West Makushita #57; 4–1–3
1960	West Makushita #55; 5–3	East Makushita #43; 5–3	East Makushita #31; 3–5	East Makushita #37; 6–1	East Makushita #20; 4–3	West Makushita #17; 3–4
1961	West Makushita #21; 4–3	West Makushita #15; 3–4	West Makushita #20; 3–4	East Makushita #23; 3–4	East Makushita #28; 3–4	West Makushita #33; 3–4
1962	East Makushita #37; 5–2	East Makushita #22; 6–1	East Makushita #6; 5–2	East Makushita #3; 5–2	East Makushita #2; 6–1	West Jūryō #14; 2–13
1963	West Makushita #6; 3–4	East Makushita #8; 3–4	East Makushita #10; 4–3	East Makushita #6; 6–1	East Makushita #1; 5–2	West Jūryō #17; 8–7
1964	East Jūryō #14; 8–7	East Jūryō #8; 6–5–4	East Jūryō #10; 5–10	West Jūryō #16; 8–7	West Jūryō #13; 10–5	East Jūryō #6; 3–12
1965	West Jūryō #16; 10–5	East Jūryō #8; 7–8	West Jūryō #9; 6–9	West Jūryō #12; 8–7	East Jūryō #10; 6–9	East Jūryō #14; 8–7
1966	West Jūryō #11; 8–7	East Jūryō #7; 6–9	West Jūryō #9; 10–5	West Jūryō #3; 6–9	East Jūryō #4; 12–3; Champion	West Maegashira #11; 8–7
1967	East Maegashira #8; 6–9	East Maegashira #11; 4–11	East Jūryō #8; 7–7–1draw	East Jūryō #8; 9–6	East Jūryō #3; 5–10	West Jūryō #9; 8–7
1968	East Jūryō #7; 8–7	West Jūryō #4; 9–6	East Jūryō #1; 8–7	East Jūryō #1; 5–10	East Jūryō #7; 7–8	East Jūryō #9; 7–8
1969	West Jūryō #9; 10–5	West Jūryō #3; 7–8	West Jūryō #4; 9–6	West Jūryō #1; 9–6	East Maegashira #9; 7–8	East Maegashira #10; 8–7
1970	West Maegashira #5; 4–11	West Maegashira #10; 6–9	West Jūryō #1; 6–9	West Jūryō #4; 7–8	East Jūryō #7; 9–6	West Jūryō #3; 7–8
1971	East Jūryō #5; 8–7	West Jūryō #2; 6–9	East Jūryō #7; 7–8	West Jūryō #8; 7–8	West Jūryō #10; 9–6	East Jūryō #4; 4–11
1972	West Jūryō #13; 9–6	West Jūryō #4; 6–9	West Jūryō #7; 8–7	West Jūryō #4; 7–8	West Jūryō #5; 6–9	West Jūryō #8; 8–7
1973	East Jūryō #6; 6–9	West Jūryō #12; 5–10	East Makushita #5; 4–3	West Makushita #3; Retired; 1–4–2		
Record given as wins–losses–absences Top division champion Top division runner-up Retired Lower divisions Non-participation Sanshō key: F=Fighting spirit; O=Outstanding performance; T=Technique Also shown: ★=Kinboshi; P=Playoff(s); Divisions: Makuuchi — Jūryō — Makushita — Sandanme — Jonidan — Jonokuchi Makuuchi ranks: Yokozuna — Ōzeki — Sekiwake — Komusubi — Maegashira

== See also ==
- Glossary of sumo terms
- List of past sumo wrestlers
- List of sumo tournament second division champions
