= Mitoryū Takayuki =

Mongolian sumo wrestler

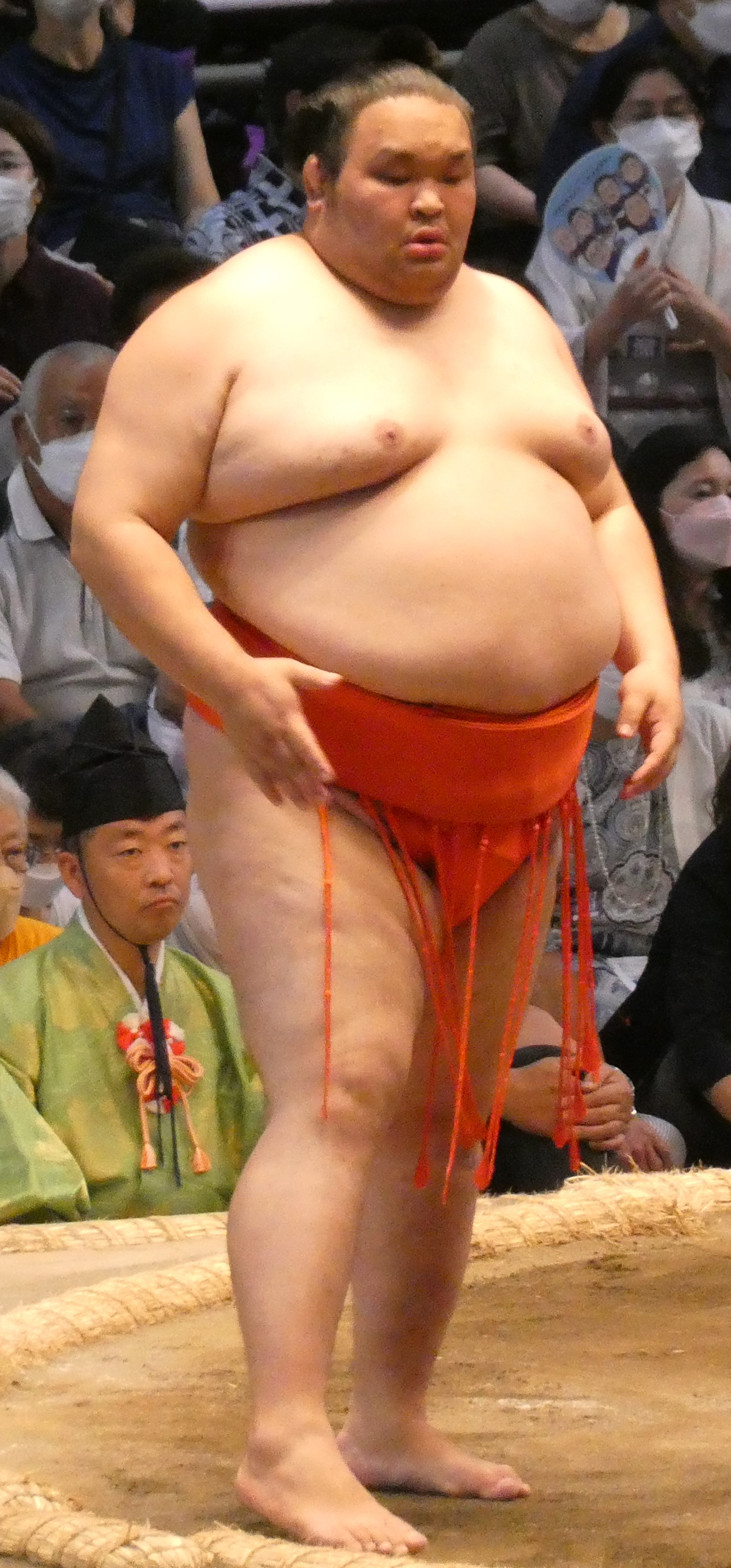
- Mitoryū in 2022

Personal information
- Native name: 水戸龍 聖之
- Born: Baasansuren Turbold; April 25, 1994 (age 32) Ulaanbaatar, Mongolia
- Height: 1.90 m (6 ft 3 in)
- Weight: 195 kg (430 lb; 30 st 10 lb)

Sport
- Sport: Sumo
- University team: Nihon University
- Retired: September 2025
- Heya: Nishikido
- Record: 332-332-42
- Debut: May 2017
- Highest rank: Maegashira 13 (May 2024)
- Championships: 2 (Jūryō)
- Updated on 19 September 2025

Mitoryū Takayuki (Japanese: 水戸龍 聖之; born April 25, 1994 as Baasansuren Turbold (Mongolian: Баасансүрэнгийн Төрболд)) is a Mongolian former professional sumo wrestler from Ulaanbaatar. He began his professional sumo career in 2017 at the age of twenty three. His highest rank was maegashira 13. He wrestled for Nishikido stable.

== Early life and education ==
Growing up in Mongolia Turbold was a great athlete participating in many different sports like judo, basketball, darts, and speed skating. He was especially good at speed skating having the ability to win at the district level. For high school Turbold studied abroad in Japan at Tottori Jōhoku High School, this is where he started training in sumo. After graduating from high school he entered Nihon University and their sumo club. In his third year at the university he won the All-Japan Sumo Championship giving him the title of amateur Yokozuna (the first foreigner to do so). The following year he served as the club captain, and won the National Student Sumo Championship and giving him the title of Student Yokozuna (also the first foreigner to do so).

== Career ==
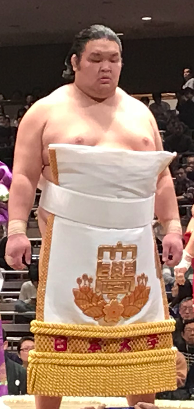
Mitoryu during his jūryō debut, January 2018

After graduating from university Turbold entered Nishikido stable, recruited by former sekiwake Mitoizumi. His amateur success granted him makushita tsukedashi status, allowing him skip the lower divisions and start at Makushita 15. He started his career with a makekoshi or losing record but quickly rebounded with three consecutive winning records. After this string of winning records he was given sekitori status by being promoted to the jūryō division. He was the first sekitori produced by his stable since its founding in 2002. He started off his jūryō debut with a winning 8–7, he followed this up with another winning record although he had to withdraw the last four days with he injury. The next tournament he was unable to achieve a winning record managing only a 6–9 record. He rebounded to with a 8–7 winning record the following tournament but suffered only his third losing record with a 7–8 finish. He rebounded yet again to get a 9–6 finish.

He reached jūryō 4 in January 2020. In July 2020 at the rank of jūryō 14 he produced a 10–5 record, losing a playoff for the yūshō or championship to Akua. He won his first jūryō championship in July 2021 with a 12-3 record, and reached jūryō 1 in the following September 2021 tournament, narrowly missing out on promotion to the top makuuchi division.

He was forced to sit out the January 2022 tournament after a member of Nishikido stable tested positive for COVID-19.

In September 2022 Mitoryū reached the top division for the first time at maegashira 16.

In August 2023, Mitoryū was the heaviest active sekitori wrestler at 201 kg (443 lb). Later in the year, at the November tournament, Mitoryū was involved in a match with Shimanoumi marked by a rare mizu-iri (water break), the first in the jūryō division in 24 years.

At the March 2024 tournament, Mitoryū won his second jūryō tournament with a 12–3 record, almost certainly earning him repromotion to sumo's top division. During his return to sumo's top division, he lost his match against one of the tournament leaders (Takarafuji) and had to limp off the ring after Takarafuji fell on his ankle. After the match, however, he insisted that he was not injured.

Mitoryū withdrew on Day 11 of the May 2024 tournament. It was reported that a few days earlier, he appeared to be favoring his left leg after inadvertently collapsing in his match against Takarafuji. His medical certificate with the Sumo Association stated that the withdrawal was due to osteoarthritis in both of his knees. With only two wins, he was demoted again to jūryō.

Mitoryū retired during the September 2025 tournament, after having lost four matches in a row ranked at jūryō 10 at the beginning of the previous tournament. At his retirement press conference on 20 September, Mitoryū said that his retirement was the result of "illness and injury." He said that his favorite match was his first in professional competition, when he had entered as a tsukedashi wrestler. He also told reporters about his view on the differences between amateur and professional sumo, suggesting in his experience that amateur wrestlers don't push themselves as hard and tend to relax more during a match after holding an opponent or grabbing one's mawashi. Mitoryū will have a retirement ceremony in February 2026, and while he is expected to continue living in Japan, he will not remain with the Japan Sumo Association. Mitoryū's retirement ceremony took place on February 1, 2026, with approximately 280 people participating in the cutting of his topknot.

== Fighting style ==
Mitoryū was a yotsu-sumo wrestler, preferring grappling techniques to pushing and thrusting. His most common winning technique was a straightforward yorikiri (frontal force out), representing about a quarter of his wins. A number of other victories came by way of oshidashi (frontal push out) and uwatenage (overarm throw). He used a migi-yotsu grip on the mawashi, with his right hand inside and left hand outside his opponent's arms.

== Career record ==
Mitoryū Takayuki
Year	January Hatsu basho, Tokyo	March Haru basho, Osaka	May Natsu basho, Tokyo	July Nagoya basho, Nagoya	September Aki basho, Tokyo	November Kyūshū basho, Fukuoka
2017	x	(Banzukegai)	Makushita tsukedashi #15; 3–4	West Makushita #23; 5–2	East Makushita #14; 6–1	East Makushita #4; 6–1
2018	East Jūryō #13; 8–7	West Jūryō #10; 8–4–3	West Jūryō #9; 6–9	West Jūryō #11; 8–7	West Jūryō #10; 7–8	East Jūryō #12; 9–6
2019	West Jūryō #9; 6–9	East Jūryō #12; 9–6	East Jūryō #9; 7–8	East Jūryō #9; 9–6	East Jūryō #6; 6–9	West Jūryō #9; 9–6
2020	West Jūryō #4; 6–9	East Jūryō #7; 4–11	West Jūryō #14; Tournament Cancelled; State of Emergency; 0–0–0	West Jūryō #14; 10–5–P	East Jūryō #8; 6–9	East Jūryō #11; 8–7
2021	West Jūryō #10; 8–7	East Jūryō #9; 5–10	West Jūryō #10; 9–6	West Jūryō #6; 12–3; Champion	East Jūryō #1; 2–7–6	East Jūryō #9; 8–7
2022	East Jūryō #7; Sat out due to COVID rules 0–1–14	East Jūryō #7; 10–5	East Jūryō #3; 7–8	West Jūryō #4; 9–6	East Maegashira #16; 5–10	West Jūryō #3; 9–6
2023	West Maegashira #15; 7–8	East Maegashira #17; 8–7	East Maegashira #16; 5–10	West Jūryō #2; 6–9	West Jūryō #3; 7–8	West Jūryō #4; 9–6
2024	West Jūryō #1; 7–8	West Jūryō #2; 12–3; Champion	East Maegashira #13; 2–9–4	West Jūryō #3; 6–9	West Jūryō #7; 6–7–2	East Jūryō #8; 7–8
2025	West Jūryō #8; 8–7	East Jūryō #6; 4–11	East Jūryō #12; 8–7	East Jūryō #10; 0–5–10	West Makushita #7; Retired; 0–0–3	x
Record given as wins–losses–absences Top division champion Top division runner-up Retired Lower divisions Non-participation Sanshō key: F=Fighting spirit; O=Outstanding performance; T=Technique Also shown: ★=Kinboshi; P=Playoff(s); Divisions: Makuuchi — Jūryō — Makushita — Sandanme — Jonidan — Jonokuchi Makuuchi ranks: Yokozuna — Ōzeki — Sekiwake — Komusubi — Maegashira

== See also ==
- Glossary of sumo terms
- List of past sumo wrestlers
- List of heaviest sumo wrestlers
- List of Mongolian sumo wrestlers
- List of non-Japanese sumo wrestlers
- List of sumo second division champions
