= Nishikido stable =

Organization of sumo wrestlers

Coordinates: 35.6975°N 139.7992°E

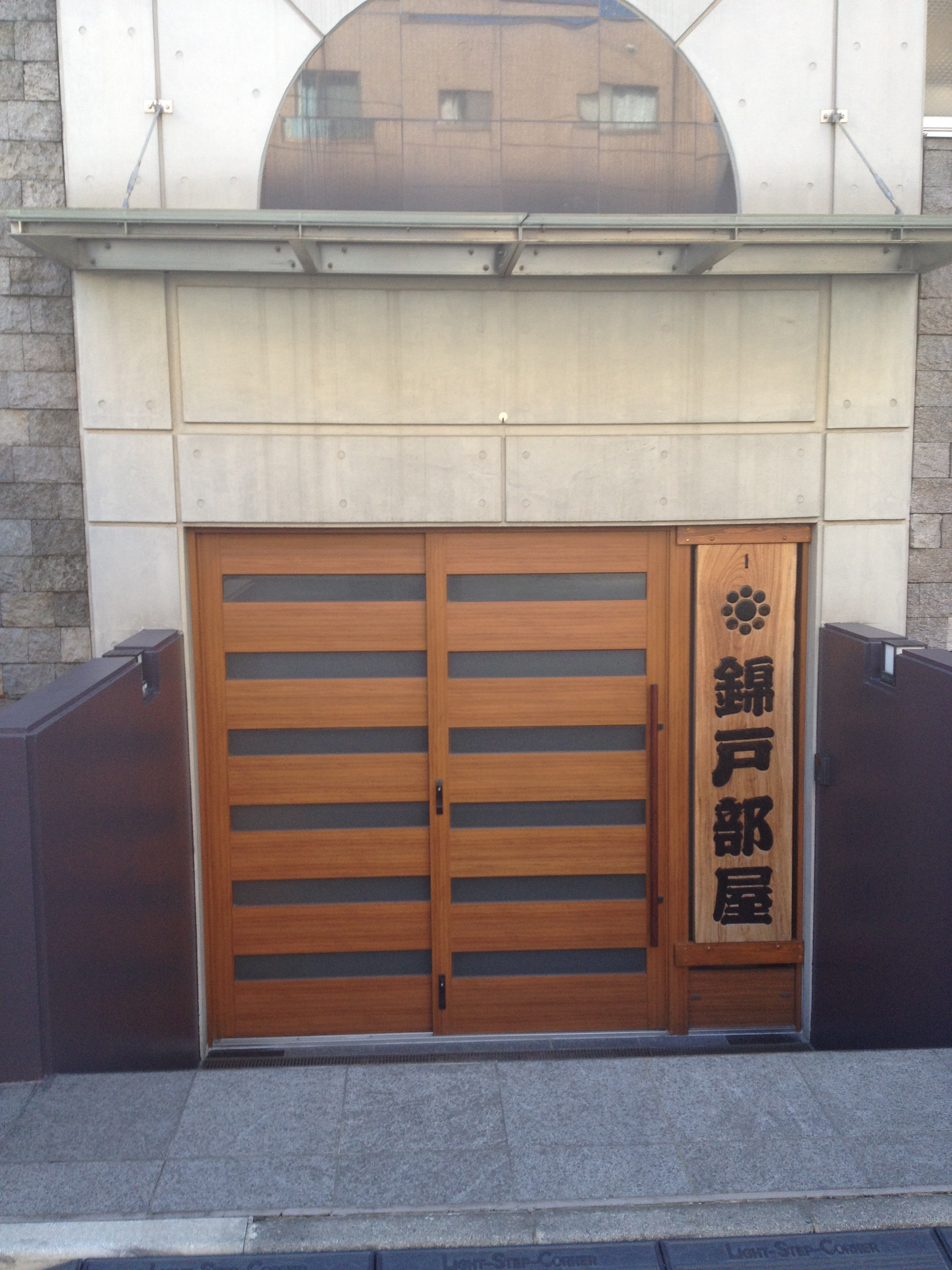
Front door of Nishikido stable in 2014

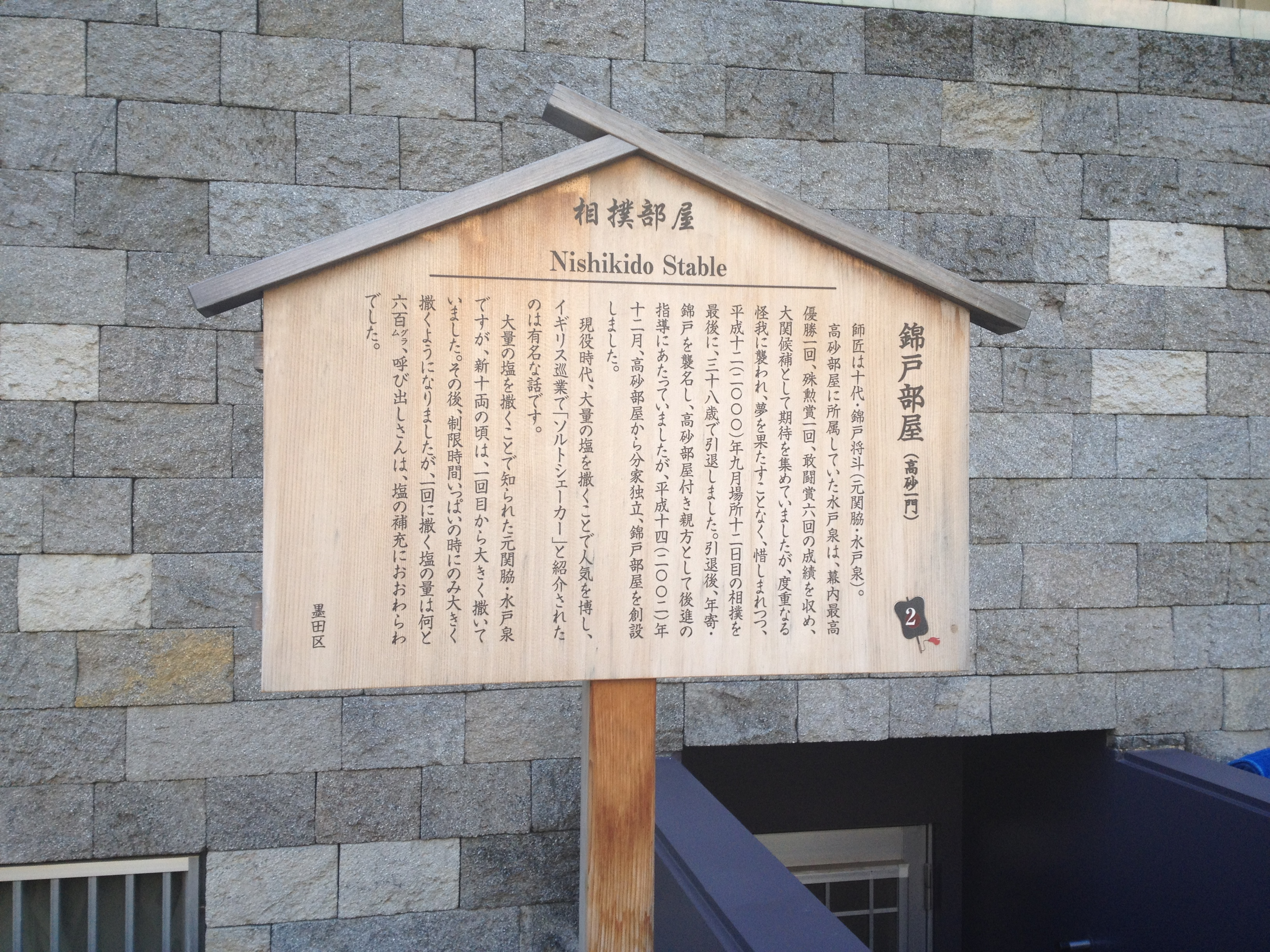
Board commemorating the history of Nishikido

Nishikido stable (Japanese: 錦戸部屋, Nishikido-beya) is a stable of sumo wrestlers, one of the Takasago group of stables. It was founded in 2002 by Mitoizumi of the Takasago stable.

It was home to the first Kazakh wrestler in professional sumo, Kazafuzan, who reached a career hig rank of makushita 10 in November 2008 and retired in September 2014. In 2015, the stable recruited Canadian Brodi Henderson of Victoria who competed as Homarenishiki, but he suddenly left sumo the following year. Several other wrestlers retired at the same time, leaving just five active wrestlers in the stable after July 2016. In 2017, the Mongolian Mitoryū (Turbold Baasansuren) joined as a makushita tsukedashi entrant from Nihon University, and he became the stable's first ever sekitori after the November 2017 tournament. (Another wrestler, Gokushindo, was ranked jūryō 13 for just one tournament in November 2018.) The retirement of Gokushindo after the May 2022 tournament left Mitoryū as the stable's only active wrestler (jonokuchi ranked Fujiizumi has not competed since September 2021).

In April 2025, Sendagawa (maegashira and top-division champion Tokushōryū) joined Nishikido stable as a coach.

As of May 2026, the stable has only 1 active wrestler.

== Owner ==
- 2002–present: 10th Nishikido (yakuin taigū iin, sekiwake Mitoizumi, born 1962)

== Coach ==
- Wakamatsu Takehiko (fuku-riji, maegashira Asanowaka, born 1969)
- Sendagawa Makoto (toshiyori, maegashira Tokushōryū, born 1986)

== Notable active wrestlers ==
- None

== Notable former wrestlers ==
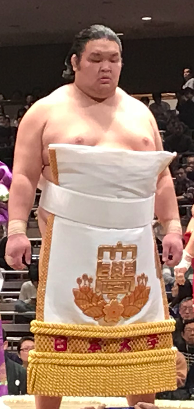
Mitoryū is the stable's first sekitori

- Mitoryū (maegashira 13, born 1994)
- Gokushindo (jūryō 13, born 1996)
- Kazafuzan (makushita 10, born 1984)

== Referee ==
- Kimura Kintarō (makushita gyōji, real name Hayate Matsunagai, born 1998)

== Usher ==
- Tsurutarō (sandanme yobidashi, real name Shintarō Honda, born 1994)

== Hairdresser ==
- Tokonaka (special class tokoyama, born 1960)

== Location and access ==
Tokyo, Sumida Ward, Kamezawa 1-16-1
3 minute walk from Toei Oedo Line Ryōgoku Station and 7 minute walk from Sōbu Line Ryōgoku Station
Adjacent to sister stable, Hakkaku

== See also ==
- List of sumo stables
- List of active sumo wrestlers
- List of past sumo wrestlers
- Glossary of sumo terms
