= Fujinokawa Seigō =

Japanese sumo wrestler

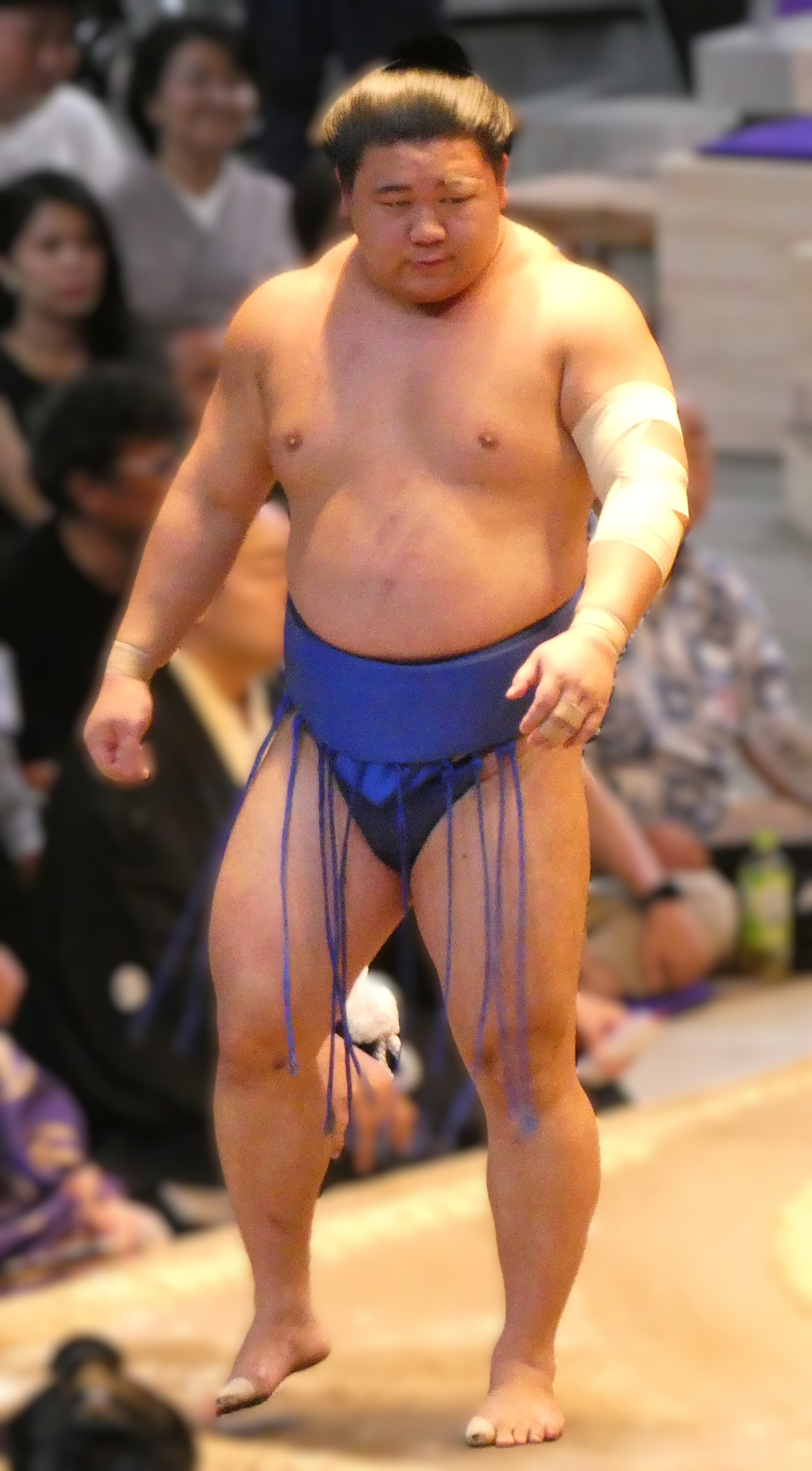

Personal information
- Native name: 藤ノ川 成剛
- Born: Seigō Saitō; February 22, 2005 (age 21) Edogawa, Tokyo, Japan
- Height: 1.77 m (5 ft 9 1/2 in)
- Weight: 125 kg (276 lb; 19.7 st)

Sport
- Sport: Sumo
- Rank: see below
- Heya: Isenoumi
- Debut: January 2023
- Highest rank: Sekiwake (September 2026)
- Championships: 1 (Sandanme)
- Special Prizes: Fighting Spirit (2); Technique (1); Outstanding Performance (1)
- Gold Stars: 4 Ōnosato (2); Hōshōryū (2)
- Updated on September 27, 2026

Fujinokawa Seigō (Japanese: 藤ノ川 成剛; born February 22, 2005 as Seigō Saitō (齋藤 成剛, Saitō Seigō)) is a Japanese professional sumo wrestler from Edogawa, Tokyo and wrestles for the Isenoumi stable. He is the son of former maegashira wrestler Ōikari, who also wrestled for the same stable. He has won four gold stars for defeating yokozuna opponents as a maegashira, has a special prize for Technique, Fighting Spirit and Outstanding Performance.

In July 2026, Fujinokawa tied the record for the most consecutive wins (four) against a yokozuna in the history of the sport, becoming the first to do so since the end of World War II. At that time, he had never lost a match against a yokozuna.

== Early career ==
Fujinokawa was born in Edogawa, Tokyo as the elder son of former makuuchi sumo wrestler Ōikari.

During his third year at Saitama Sakae High School, he captained the sumo club.

Due to his success in high school sumo, he received offers from several universities, but was advised by the tenth generation Koyama to enter sumo sooner, so he decided not to attend university but to join the Isenoumi stable.

== Professional career ==
On 11 December 2022, it was announced that he would join his father's former stable, Isenoumi, and make his professional sumo debut in the January 2023 tournament, instead of waiting until he graduated from high school. At the shinjo promotion ceremony, he entered the ring wearing the mawashi that his father had used during his active career, and changed his shikona from his real name, which he used during his amateur career, to "Wakaikari".

In the July 2023 tournament, he won all seven of his bouts and defeated Asahakuryu in the deciding match to win the sandanme division championship.

He was promoted to the makushita division in September 2023. In his seventh makushita tournament in September 2024, he finished with a record of four wins and three losses from makushita 2, and after the seventh match, his promotion to jūryō was considered a certainty. On 25 September, the Japan Sumo Association decided to promote Wakaikari for the November tournament. This is the 13th time in history that a father and son has been promoted to sekitori, and a first for the Isenoumi stable. At the press conference, he revealed that he was considering taking on his father's shikona "Ōikari" once he reached the makuuchi division.

In the November tournament, he entered as jūryō 13 east. He lost his first three matches before winning his fourth match by default against makushita Kamito. He then lost his following two matches to have a record of 1 win and 5 losses. He won his seventh bout against Chiyomaru, and then won four consecutive matches. He won his seventh match, but lost the remaining two days to finish with a record of 7 wins and 8 losses.

In the January 2025 tournament, he won four straight matches from day one, he then had his first loss before winning five straight matches, which put him in the running for the championship. On the eleventh day, he was injured after losing to his rival Shishi and was forced to withdraw for the first time in his career due to a distal rupture of the left biceps tendon. He finished with a record of 9 wins, 3 losses and 3 absences.

In the March 2025 tournament, he was ranked jūryō 9 east, and had a winning record of 8 wins and 7 losses. In the May tournament, he was ranked jūryō 5 east, he finished with an excellent record of 12 wins and 3 losses despite being one win short of the champion Kusano.

When the rankings for the July 2025 tournament were revealed on June 30, his debut in the top makuuchi division was confirmed, and it was announced that he would change his shikona from Wakaikari to Fujinokawa, the traditional shikona of the Isenoumi stable. He is the sixth wrestler to use the name "Fujinokawa"; this marks the first time in nine tournaments since the January 2024 tournament that a wrestler with a shikona ending in "kawa" that is not derived from his real name has returned to the rankings. On the third day, he pushed out Hidenoumi to win his first makuuchi match. He continued to win, and on the 13th day, with a record of 7 wins and 5 losses, he was given a walkover victory when his opponent, Takerufuji, withdrew from the tournament. He also won his last two matches to finish with ten wins and five losses and was awarded the Kanto-sho (Fighting Spirit Prize).

At the March 2026 tournament, Fujinokawa, having reached a career-high rank of Maegashira 2, won his first Kinboshi on Day 3 when he defeated Yokozuna Ōnosato by hikiotoshi. He won his second Kinboshi the next day when he defeated Yokozuna Hōshōryū by hatakikomi, handing the Yokozuna his first defeat of the tournament. By defeating Ōhō on the final day of the tournament to secure a winning record, Fujinokawa was awarded the first Technique Prize of his career. Fujinokawa then withdrew from the Spring Tour due to a neck injury.

On the second day of the July 2026 tournament, Fujinokawa defeated Ōnosato for the second time in a row, earning him a third kinboshi and maintaining a perfect record against the yokozuna with two wins in two matches. The next day, Fujinokawa repeated the feat against Hōshōryū, earning his fourth kinboshi. This victory marked the continuation of his perfect record against the two yokozuna of the time, as he had never lost a match to them. This performance also puts Fujinokawa on par with the three other instances in sumo history in which a wrestler has won four consecutive bouts against yokozuna, and marks it the first time since the end of World War II—a first since Musashiyama won a fourth consecutive victories over five tournaments against yokozuna Miyagiyama at the 1931 January tournament. Before the final day of the tournament, it was announced that Fujinokawa could win his very first special prize for Outstanding Performance if he won his last match and score a positive record. Fujinokawa won against Fujiseiun and received the award.

During the September 2026 tournament, Fujinokawa stood out by remaining among the wrestlers in contention for the championship. During the tournament, he also defeated all the wrestlers ranked as ōzeki. On the final day, it was announced that Fujinokawa would receive an unconditional special prize for Fighting Spirit.

== Career record ==
Fujinokawa Seigō
Year	January Hatsu basho, Tokyo	March Haru basho, Osaka	May Natsu basho, Tokyo	July Nagoya basho, Nagoya	September Aki basho, Tokyo	November Kyūshū basho, Fukuoka
2023	(Maezumō)	East Jonokuchi #13; 6–1	East Jonidan #33; 5–2	East Sandanme #86; 7–0–P; Champion	West Makushita #55; 5–2	East Makushita #35; 6–1
2024	East Makushita #15; 4–3	East Makushita #10; 4–3	West Makushita #6; 4–3	West Makushita #5; 4–3	West Makushita #2; 4–3	East Jūryō #13; 7–8
2025	East Jūryō #13; 9–3–3	East Jūryō #9; 8–7	West Jūryō #5; 12–3	West Maegashira #14; 10–5; F	West Maegashira #9; 6–9	East Maegashira #12; 9–6
2026	West Maegashira #7; 10–5	East Maegashira #2; 8–7; T★★	East Maegashira #1; 7–8	East Maegashira #1; 8–7; O★★	West Sekiwake #1; 11–4; F	East Sekiwake #1; 7–8
Record given as wins–losses–absences Top division champion Top division runner-up Retired Non-participation Jūryō Lower divisions Sanshō key: F=Fighting spirit; O=Outstanding performance; T=Technique Also shown: ★=Kinboshi; P=Playoff(s); Divisions: Makuuchi — Jūryō — Makushita — Sandanme — Jonidan — Jonokuchi Makuuchi ranks: Yokozuna — Ōzeki — Sekiwake — Komusubi — Maegashira

== See also ==
- Glossary of sumo terms
- List of active sumo wrestlers
- List of active gold star earners
- List of active special prize winners
- List of sumo top division runners-up
- List of sekiwake
