= Hakuhō Cup =

Annual school sumo competition in Japan

Hakuhō Cup 白鵬杯
- Hakuhō Cup logo representing Hakuhō's shiranui ring-entering ceremony style
- Status: Active
- Genre: Sports competition
- Frequency: Annually
- Venue: 1: Ryōgoku Kokugikan (2010-2025); 2: Toyota Arena Tokyo (2026-)
- Locations: 1: Sumida, Tokyo; Japan; 2: Aomi, Tokyo; Japan
- Years active: 15–16
- Founder: Hakuhō Shō
- Participants: Elementary, middle and junior high school students
- Major events: Sumo matches
- Sponsors: JCI Tokyo; SANKYO Co., Ltd.
- Website: in Japanese hakuho-cup.com

The Hakuhō Cup (Japanese: 白鵬杯, Hepburn: Hakuhō-hai) is a sumo competition for elementary and middle school students held every year in Japan.

== Origin ==
The Hakuhō Cup is one of the largest and most prestigious junior sumo event in the Japanese amateur calendar. Its origins are actually in the Asashōryū Cup. The Wanpaku National Championship is an all-Japanese event, and Asashōryū wished to allow Mongolian kids on the dohyō in the Kokugikan. The first Asashōryū Cup was held in August 2009, in the Kokugikan. At the time, no individual competitions were held, and in total 12 teams of 5 wrestlers per team, each consisting of boys aged 8 to 12, competed in a team competition. The event was largely won by the Mongolian delegation, who scored a no-defeats. The competition was however a mixed success with only 1,000 people in the audience instead of the advertised 7,000. Asashōryū, who wanted to make this an annual event, was forced to retire a few months later, and the event was never repeated.

Hakuhō was then the only yokozuna and established his own event in 2010. The Hakuhō Cup in its current form is an event for boys from first to ninth grade. Around 1,300 boys attended the 2020 event, hailing from Asian countries, such as China, Hong Kong, Mongolia, South Korea, Taiwan, Thailand and Japan but also from the Brazil, Georgia, Poland, Ukraine and the USA.

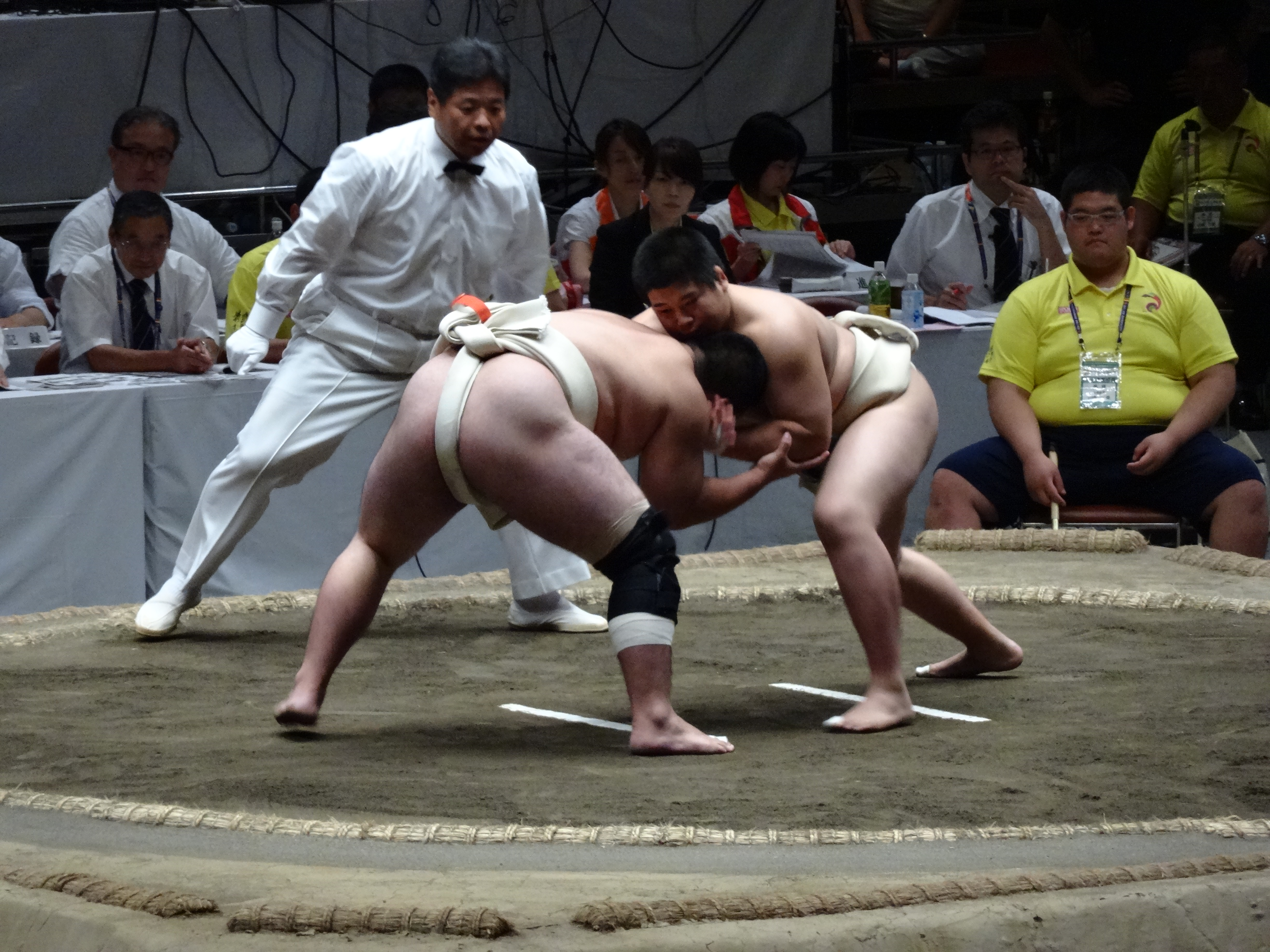
Amateur tournaments are regularly held in the Ryōgoku Kokugikan

Since 2014, the event is produced by Osamu Suzuki, an experienced screenwriter. The tournament is a popular event with lectures by former professional wrestlers between competitions. The Hakuhō Cup is also a place where it is not uncommon to come across professional wrestlers, whether they are retired or active, who come to encourage their son or to participate in the organization by refereeing or in some other capacity. All the members of the former Miyagino stable were involved in the event. Since the event has grown into a prestigious amateur competition, many participants have had successful careers in sumo, and include sekitori like makuuchi-ranked wrestlers Ōnoshō, Ura, Kotozakura and Hakunofuji.

Hakuhō announced in August 2025 that the 2026 event would move to a new arena, the Toyota Arena Tokyo, following his departure from the Japan Sumo Association. It will be the first Hakuhō Cup held outside of the Ryōgoku Kokugikan. It will also be the first to hold a competition for females, as women were not allowed to participate in matches at the Kokugikan.

== Organization ==
The tournament is a private event, and only clubs that have received an invitation may take part. The event is an amateur sumo competition. Competitors are between 5 and 15 years old, and are divided into 7 divisions (ranging from first grade to sixth grade and junior high school). An eighth category, combining participants from the first seven to form groups that will compete for the team title, is also its own division. Like in professional sumo, the most deserving young wrestlers are entitled to special awards modelled on the sanshō prizes. Another prize, the Osamu Suzuki Award, is also awarded. Each wrestler competing in his division must win to advance in the competition.

The event is recognized as an organizational challenge, with participants coming from all over the world and from all over Japan. Organizing accommodation is particularly complicated. The tournament also takes place in the middle of the school year.

During the period of the event, it is common for stables to open their doors to students to train and eat with professional wrestlers.

== Previous events ==
Results only began to be published in 2016

=== 2010-2013 ===
In 2010, the first Hakuhō Cup took place in the Ohama Sumo Hall of Sakai, Osaka Prefecture. The event gathered around 750 elementary and junior high school students. Among them, 8 amateurs from Mongolia participated to a sumo event for the first time. The original event should have taken place in Mongolia in June, but the travel was cancelled and the event postponed due to the scandals that erupted within the Japan Sumo Association at the time. Professional wrestlers Ōnoshō Fumiya participated in the event and his Aomori team won the team competition of that year. Makuuchi wrestler Ura Kazuki also attended the event. The Hakuho Cup then took place in December 2011 in Osaka.

The following year, the Hakuhō Cup took place in April 2012 in Ōsaki, Miyagi Prefecture to entertain the children after the earthquake that devastated the prefecture. The location was also chosen as Hakuhō is also a tourism ambassador for the city and he felt it was also his responsibility to help the reconstruction effort. Only elementary and junior high school students from the Tōhoku region were allowed to participate in the tournament.

In 2013, the event was held on February 11 and, for the first time, took place in Tokyo at the Ariake Colosseum. The tournament was marked by the victory of the two children of Tokitsukaze stablemaster (Tokitsuumi Masahiro). His first son, Hiroichi Sakamoto, won the fourth-grade division, and his second son, Masamasa, won the first-grade division. In the same tournament, Kamatani Masakatsu (son of Sadogatake stablemaster Kotonowaka Terumasa) came third in the junior high school division.

=== 2014 ===
The event was held at the Ryōgoku Kokugikan in Tokyo on February, 2. Around 566 elementary and junior high school students from Japan, Mongolia, South Korea and China took part in the tournament. For the first time, the event was produced by screenwriter Osamu Suzuki who also designed a prize that was set to be awarded to the most memorable wrestler. The prize, taking the shape of a championship belt, went to Kaishin Nakanishi (from Wakayama Sumo School), who finished second in the individual competition in the first-grade division. Among future sekitori, Rōga Tokiyoshi placed 8th in the individual junior high school division.

=== 2015 ===
The event was held at the Ryōgoku Kokugikan in Tokyo on February, 1. Some 800 children from eight countries participated in the tournament. Among the participants, Kotomitsuki Keiji's son participated. It was the first public appearance of Kotomitsuki since his dismissal by the Association. That year, the individual championship (junior high school) was won by Kawazoe Keita, who later joined Miyagino stable under the name Kihō, using the makushita tsukedashi system to reflects his other successes.

=== 2016 ===
The event was held at the Ryōgoku Kokugikan in Tokyo on January, 31. The sponsor of that year's event was ōzeki Kotoshogiku who was the first Japanese wrestler to win a January tournament in ten years that year. The individual championship (junior high school) of that year was won by Nakamura Daiki who later joined Nishonoseki stable under the shikona Ōnosato in 2023. Among the thousand participants, Hakuhō own son took part for the first time in the event. For the first time, a Mongolian won the Outstanding Performance prize.

=== 2017 ===
The event was held at the Ryōgoku Kokugikan in Tokyo on January, 29. The sponsor of that year's event was Yokozuna Kakuryū. A record number of more than 1,200 people gathered from Japan, Mongolia and the USA. Hakuhō's son, eight-year-old Mahato, participated in the second-grade division of the individual tournament but was eliminated in the first round, as he was in 2016. It was also the first time a Mongolian won the Fighting Spirit prize.

=== 2018 ===
The event was held at the Ryōgoku Kokugikan in Tokyo on February, 13. Around 1,300 elementary and junior high school students from eight countries and regions, including Mongolia, Taiwan and Hong Kong, gathered for the event. That year, the individual championship (junior high school division) was won by Shingo Mukainakano, who later joined Miyagino stable.

=== 2019 ===
The event was held at the Ryōgoku Kokugikan in Tokyo on February, 11. On this edition, 54 teams and 1,194 participants from eight countries, including Japan, China and Mongolia, took part to the event. The sponsor of that year's event was Yokozuna Kisenosato. That year, the individual championship (junior high school division) was won by Tetsuya Ochiai, who later joined Miyagino stable. In the fourth-grade individual competition, one match attracted particular attention after the underdog defeated after a thrilling match an opponent twice his weight. The winning wrestler, Kōsei Motomura, was awarded the competition's Technique Prize and then joined Sadogatake stable in April 2024, becoming the first wrestler since the end of the Second World War to be under 1.60 m (5 ft 3 in) tall.

=== 2020 ===
The event was held at the Ryōgoku Kokugikan in Tokyo on February 2. A record number of more than 1,100 entrants from 14 countries participated to the event with 142 teams competing in the team division. This record makes the 10th edition of the Hakuhō Cup the largest sumo tournament in history. For the first time, a team of 5 Brazilians participated to the event. At the occasion of the ten years of the event, the Hakuhō Cup was sponsored by two yokozuna: Kisenosato and Harumafuji. It was also the first public appearance of Harumafuji to an event linked to the Japan Sumo Association since his retirement and the first time the three yokozuna publicly met together since Harumafuji and Kisenosato retired. Olympics Minister Seiko Hashimoto also gave a speech for the opening ceremony. The Chinese team, which was scheduled to participate, was unable to come to Japan due to the spread of pneumonia caused by the new coronavirus.

=== 2021 ===
The 11th Hakuhō Cup was cancelled due to the spread of coronavirus.

=== 2022 ===
After taking a year off because of pandemic-related situations, the 12th Hakuhō Cup took place on April 3 in the Ōta-city General Gymnasium in Tokyo, a venue chosen at the last minute to comply with COVID-19 protocols. Because of coronavirus protocols, the number of people in the venue, divided into morning and afternoon sessions for each grade, was kept to a minimum and general public admission was cancelled. The tournament was however streamed on YouTube. About 2,000 people attended, including 600 contestants. Former ōzeki Kotoōshū served as sponsor for this edition.

=== 2023 ===
The event was held at the Ryōgoku Kokugikan in Tokyo on February 12. Over 122 teams with a total of 920 wrestlers were invited to compete. The event had been scaled down due to the COVID-19 pandemic, but returned to normal for the first time in three years. In addition to first to third-graders from all over Japan, children from seven countries (Mongolia, Hong Kong, Taiwan, Thailand, the US, Australia, and Ukraine) also gathered. For the first time, a "Toddler division" was introduced to allow really young kids to compete. During the competition, Uriah Ulima Kamahao Luamanu of Hawaii won a bronze medal in the elementary school fifth-grade division. By doing so, he became the first-ever Hakuhō Cup medalist from the United States, and also the first wrestler from outside of Japan or Mongolia to reach the podium in any classification during the 13-year history of the event.

=== 2024 ===
The 2024 edition of the Hakuhō Cup was held at the Ryōgoku Kokugikan on 12 February. A total of 1,100 people took part in the competition, with athletes from nine different foreign countries (Thailand, Brazil, Taiwan, Ukraine, Mongolia, Georgia, Poland, the USA and South Korea). Exceptionally, a children's group from Ishikawa Prefecture was invited to take part as an honorary group, to entertain the children after the 2024 Noto earthquake. Hiroto, son of former ōzeki Kotoshōgiku competed in the toddler division team competition and his club (Kashiwa Sumo Boy's Club) won the tournament. Former junior high school division winner Ōnosato also attended the event as a spectator, having come to cheer on Ibata Yūki (a wrestler also from Tsubata, Ishikawa). Yuki then went on to win the individual Junior High competition.

=== 2025 ===
As a result of the Hokuseihō's scandal and retirement and the closure of Miyagino stable, the event was initially assumed to be cancelled due to the disciplinary punishment meted out to stablemaster Miyagino (former yokozuna Hakuhō), the latter also mentioning in the press at the time of the scandal that he didn't consider it appropriate to hold the tournament. Encouraged by the children's clubs and friends, Miyagino and his tutor Isegahama (former yokozuna Asahifuji) announced in December 2024 that they would be organizing the fifteenth edition of the event. Due to the late announcement of the organization, it was expected that many international clubs would not be able to make the trip. However, it was announced that Ukrainian clubs had been invited. Finally, clubs on the Noto Peninsula were also honored after the earthquake that struck at the beginning of the previous year.

Around 1,100 children took part in this year's competition and a total of fifteen countries (the largest number since the beginnings of the Hakuhō Cup) were represented, with Kyrgyzstan being represented for the first time. The Georgian delegation was led by former komusubi Kokkai, President of the Georgian Sumo Federation. Unusually, that year's Junior High competition was won by a freshman, Mongolian Temujin Chilgun, a rare achievement for a nationwide competition and the first time in the history of the Hakuhō Cup that a non-third-year student won the division.

=== 2026 ===
Organized for the first time since Hakuhō's definitive departure from the Sumo Association, the 2026 edition of the Hakuhō Cup was scheduled to be held at the Toyota Arena in Tokyo on February 7 and 8. For the first time, women will be allowed to compete in existing categories, and new divisions (senior high school, university, and adult professional) will be introduced. The International Sumo Federation is also involved in the event for the first time, becoming its official sponsor.

== Competition results ==
Year		Category	Results	Country	Shikona	Ref
5th	2015	team	(gold) Nakadomari Dojo	Japan		
5th	2015	team	(silver) Kawakami Dojo	Japan		
5th	2015	team	(bronze) Iruma Dojo	Japan		
5th	2015	junior high	(gold) Kawazoe Keita	Japan	Hananofuji	
5th	2015	junior high	(silver) Yūta Takahashi	Japan	Shirokuma	
5th	2015	junior high	(bronze) Mikiya Ishioka	Japan	Takerufuji	
6th	2016	team	(gold) Mongolian delegation	Mongolia		
6th	2016	team	(silver) Kawakami Dojo A	Japan		
6th	2016	team	(bronze) Aso Iwashita Sumo Dojo A	Japan		
6th	2016	6th grade	(gold) Kawazoe Fūma	Japan		
6th	2016	6th grade	(silver) Fujita Kazushō	Japan		
6th	2016	6th grade	(bronze) Hamaguchi Hayato	Japan		
6th	2016	junior high	(gold) Nakamura Daiki	Japan	Ōnosato	
6th	2016	junior high	(silver) Kawabuchi Kazuto	Japan	Kawabuchi	
6th	2016	junior high	(bronze) Osanai Ryū	Japan		
7th	2017	team	(gold) Kawakami Dojo A	Japan		
7th	2017	team	(silver) Mongolian delegation	Mongolia		
7th	2017	team	(bronze) Nakadomari Dojo	Japan		
7th	2017	6th grade	(gold) Narita Rikido	Japan		
7th	2017	6th grade	(silver) Ikumei Tomoyuki	Japan		
7th	2017	6th grade	(bronze) Nishida Kenshin	Japan	Nishida	
7th	2017	junior high	(gold) Kawabuchi Kazuyoshi	Japan		
7th	2017	junior high	(silver) Kazuya Tsuchiya	Japan		
7th	2017	junior high	(bronze) Kageyama Yoshinaka	Japan		
8th	2018	team	(gold) Kawakami Dojo A	Japan		
8th	2018	team	(silver) Kashiwa Sumo Boy's Club	Japan		
8th	2018	team	(bronze) Arita Boy's Sumo Club	Japan		
8th	2018	6th grade	(gold) Masami Tada	Japan		
8th	2018	6th grade	(silver) Ōte Kisei	Japan		
8th	2018	6th grade	(bronze) Yamashita Kaisuke	Japan		
8th	2018	junior high	(gold) Mukainakano Shingo	Japan	Mienofuji	
8th	2018	junior high	(silver) Ezure Kazuki	Japan		
8th	2018	junior high	(bronze) Shirokami Osamu	Japan		
9th	2019	team	(gold) Terada Dojo A	Japan		
9th	2019	team	(silver) Sumiyō Sumo club	Japan		
9th	2019	team	(bronze) Mongolian delegation	Mongolia		
9th	2019	6th grade	(gold) Jōichirō Kaifuku	Japan		
9th	2019	6th grade	(silver) Nakanishi Takeshin	Japan		
9th	2019	6th grade	(bronze) Hayashi Itaru	Japan		
9th	2019	junior high	(gold) Ochiai Tetsuya	Japan	Hakunofuji	
9th	2019	junior high	(silver) Tebakari Taiki	Japan	Kotoeihō	
9th	2019	junior high	(bronze) Yoshii Kō	Japan	Tokifudō	
10th	2020	team	(gold) Terada Dojo A	Japan		
10th	2020	team	(silver) Ashikita Treasure Sumo Club	Japan		
10th	2020	team	(bronze) Yaizu Boys Club	Japan		
10th	2020	6th grade	(gold) Yamashita Masakiyo	Japan		
10th	2020	6th grade	(silver) Shigemura Kōnosuke	Japan		
10th	2020	6th grade	(bronze) Anai Shōta	Japan		
10th	2020	junior high	(gold) Altangerel Sosorkhu	Mongolia		
10th	2020	junior high	(silver) Altankhuyag Bayarbold	Mongolia		
10th	2020	junior high	(bronze) Shinozaki Sōta	Japan		
11th	2021	Cancelled				
12th	2022	team	(gold) Komatsuryū Dojo	Japan		
12th	2022	team	(silver) Kashiwa Sumo Boy's Club	Japan		
12th	2022	team	(bronze) Kawasaki Club	Japan		
12th	2022	6th grade	(gold) Katatana Kyōnyō	Japan		
12th	2022	6th grade	(silver) Kai Yōta	Japan		
12th	2022	6th grade	(bronze) Ozawa Kaitō	Japan		
12th	2022	junior high	(gold) Nishide Daiki	Japan		
12th	2022	junior high	(silver) Kodama Hayato	Japan		
12th	2022	junior high	(bronze) Tamiya Aiki	Japan		
13th	2023	team	(gold) Kashiwa Shōki Boy's Club	Japan		
13th	2023	team	(silver) Tomobe Sagami Junior Group	Japan		
13th	2023	team	(bronze) Mongolian delegation	Mongolia		
13th	2023	6th grade	(gold) Sugama Soshin	Japan		
13th	2023	6th grade	(silver) Sasaki Haruki	Japan		
13th	2023	6th grade	(bronze) Hasegawa Kazuyuki	Japan		
13th	2023	junior high	(gold) Kazuma Nishimura	Japan		
13th	2023	junior high	(silver) Kuraoka Yūta	Japan		
13th	2023	junior high	(bronze) Hasegawa Kazuhirō	Japan		
14th	2024	team	(gold) Komatsuryū Dōjō	Japan		
14th	2024	team	(silver) Kashiwa Sumo Boy's Club	Japan		
14th	2024	team	(bronze) Kansai Sumo Club (K. S. C.)	Japan		
14th	2024	6th grade	(gold) Sasaki Yōki	Japan		
14th	2024	6th grade	(silver) Okayama Yūya	Japan		
14th	2024	6th grade	(bronze) Toyama Hiroto	Japan		
14th	2024	junior high	(gold) Ibata Yūki	Japan		
14th	2024	junior high	(silver) Tamiya Aiki	Japan		
14th	2024	junior high	(bronze) Tomiyama Hiroto	Japan		
15th	2025	team	(gold) Komatsuryū Dojo	Japan		
15th	2025	team	(silver) Mongolian delegation	Mongolia		
15th	2025	team	(bronze) Bunkyō Harigaya Sumo Club	Japan		
15th	2025	6th grade	(gold) Ryūga Umematsu	Japan		
15th	2025	6th grade	(silver) Tatsuki Kaneko	Japan		
15th	2025	6th grade	(bronze) Yūki Kubota	Japan		
15th	2025	junior high	(gold) Temujin Chilgun	Mongolia		
15th	2025	junior high	(silver) Yasuaki Katagiri	Japan		
15th	2025	junior high	(bronze) Ulzehishigu Hashimaragata	Mongolia		

Starting in 2026, the Hakuhō Cup included women's competitions organized according to international weight-class competition rules, without changing the men's competition categories.

Year		Category	Results			Country	Shikona	Ref
16th	2026	Team	Men competition	(gold) Tachikawa Training Hall		Japan		
16th	2026	Team	Men competition	(silver) Tsubata Town Youth Sumo Class		Japan		
16th	2026	Team	Men competition	(bronze) Komatsu Ryū Dojo		Japan		
16th	2026	Team	Women competition	not held				
16th	2026	Team	Women competition	not held				
16th	2026	Team	Women competition	not held				
16th	2026	6th grade	Men competition	(gold) Yamaji Kōsuke		Japan		
16th	2026	6th grade	Men competition	(silver) Nyamrientin Sungeerel		Mongolia		
16th	2026	6th grade	Men competition	(bronze) Shimizukawa Taichi		Japan		
16th	2026	6th grade	Women competition	lightweight	(gold) Nagai Chirei	Japan		
16th	2026	6th grade	Women competition	lightweight	(silver) Ogi Ruka	Japan		
16th	2026	6th grade	Women competition	lightweight	(bronze) Takeyama Mikoto	Japan		
16th	2026	6th grade	Women competition	middleweight	(gold) Uchida Kana	Japan		
16th	2026	6th grade	Women competition	middleweight	(silver) Ito Honomi	Japan		
16th	2026	6th grade	Women competition	middleweight	(bronze) Serizawa Junrei	Japan		
16th	2026	6th grade	Women competition	heavyweight	(gold) Gun Aika	Japan		
16th	2026	6th grade	Women competition	heavyweight	(silver) Mashiko Sarina	Japan		
16th	2026	6th grade	Women competition	heavyweight	(bronze) Sasaki Kaine	Japan		
16th	2026	Junior High	Men competition	(gold) Temujin Chirgen		Mongolia		
16th	2026	Junior High	Men competition	(silver) Urzehijig Hashimaragata		Mongolia		
16th	2026	Junior High	Men competition	(bronze) Kō Genya		Japan		
16th	2026	Junior High	Women competition	lightweight	(gold) Tsuruno Saki	Japan		
16th	2026	Junior High	Women competition	lightweight	(silver) Yamamoto Aoi	Japan		
16th	2026	Junior High	Women competition	lightweight	(bronze) Sato Miri	Japan		
16th	2026	Junior High	Women competition	middleweight	(gold) Iwata Uta	Japan		
16th	2026	Junior High	Women competition	middleweight	(silver) Aoyagi Makoto	Japan		
16th	2026	Junior High	Women competition	middleweight	(bronze) Nishimori Yuki	Japan		
16th	2026	Junior High	Women competition	light-heavyweight	(gold) Usami Rika	Japan		
16th	2026	Junior High	Women competition	light-heavyweight	(silver) Katarzyna Sidorowicz	Poland		
16th	2026	Junior High	Women competition	light-heavyweight	(bronze) Kusano Tamao	Japan		
16th	2026	Junior High	Women competition	heavyweight	(gold) Araida Shinro	Japan		
16th	2026	Junior High	Women competition	heavyweight	(silver) Horino Miku	Japan		
16th	2026	Junior High	Women competition	heavyweight	(bronze) Kumagai ichika	Japan		

== Special prizes ==
Year		Osamu Suzuki Award	Outstanding Performance prize	Technique prize	Fighting Spirit prize	Ref
4th	2014	Kaishin Nakanishi; Japan	<unknown>	<unknown>	<unknown>	
5th	2015	<unknown>				
6th	2016	Matsumura Shogo; Japan	Sosolhuu; Mongolia	Matsumura Shogo; Japan	Nakanishi Kaihin; Japan	
7th	2017	Nakanishi Kaishin; Japan	Kenshin Nishida; Japan	Koseki Takudo; Japan	Javkhlantugus; Mongolia	
8th	2018	Yuki Nishijima; Japan	Joichiro Fukuhara; Japan	Tekkei Taikia; Japan	Hirokazu Sakamoto; Japan	
9th	2019	Tsuki Takemoto; Japan	Fuma Kawazoe; Japan	Kōsei Motomura; Japan	Dorjtseren; Mongolia	
10th	2020	Konosuke Kishida; Japan	Keita Kudo; Japan	Kanta Aoki; Japan	Marita Kumagai; Japan	
11th	2021	Cancelled				
12th	2022	Daiki Nishide; Japan	Yasunari Katagiri; Japan	Ren Hoshiba; Japan	Aki Tamiya; Japan	
13th	2023	Atsuya Shima; Japan	Ulziiikhishig Khashmargad; Mongolia	Kohei Tawara; Japan	Sohi Kodama; Japan	
14th	2024	Ōshima Masao; Japan	Toyoda Rinnosuke; Japan	Hirano Yūto; Japan	Tomiyama Hiroto; Japan	
15th	2025	<not awarded>	Temujin Chilgun; Mongolia	Musashi Ōta; Japan	Takayama Maki; Japan	
16th	2026	<not awarded>				
