= Hananofuji Keita =

Japanese sumo wrestler (born 1999)

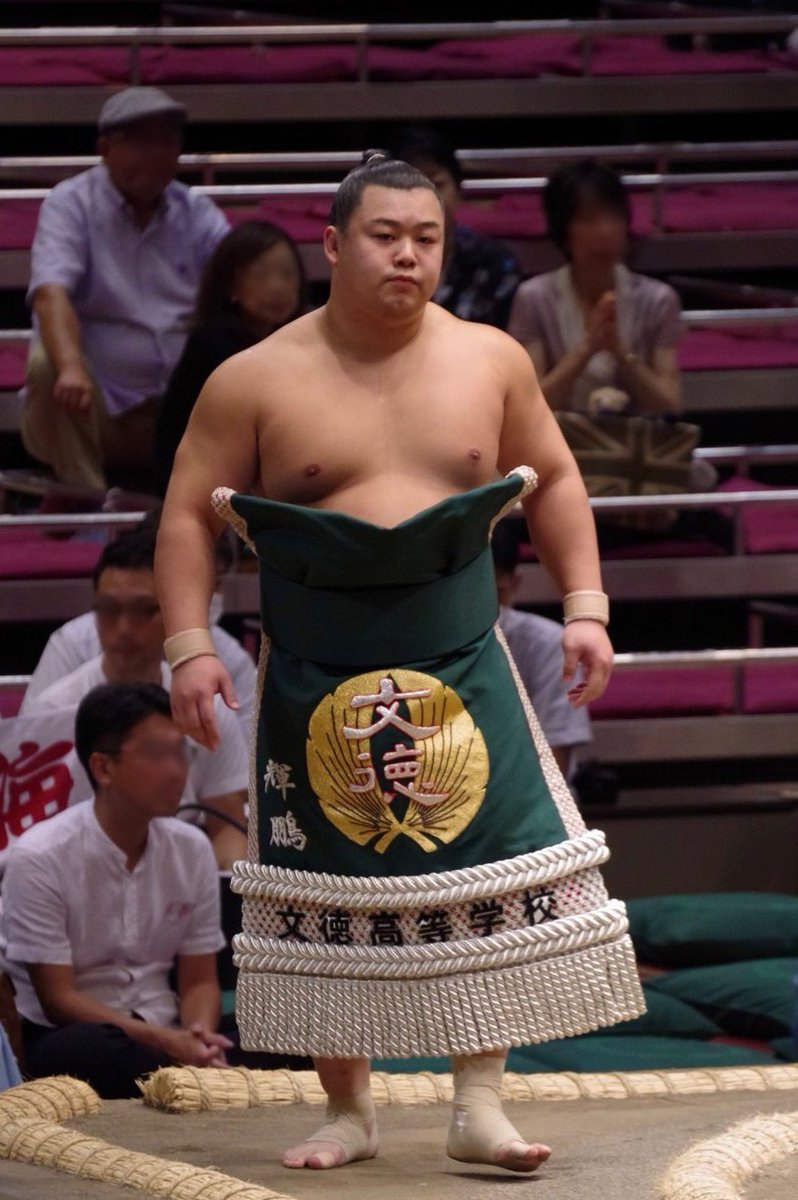
- Hananofuji in September 2023

Personal information
- Native name: 花の富士 圭太
- Born: Keita Kawazoe; April 10, 1999 (age 27) Uto, Kumamoto Prefecture; Japan
- Height: 1.67 m (5 ft 5 1/2 in)
- Weight: 115 kg (254 lb; 18.1 st)

Sport
- Sport: Sumo
- Rank: see below
- University team: Nihon University
- Heya: Miyagino → Isegahama
- Debut: September 2022
- Highest rank: Jūryō 13 (July 2023)
- Championships: 2 (Sandanme)
- Updated on January 22, 2026

Hananofuji Keita (Japanese: 花の富士 圭太; born Kawazoe Keita (川副 圭太) on April 10, 1999), is a Japanese professional sumo wrestler from Uto, Kumamoto. The highest rank he has achieved is jūryō 13. From the July 2023 tournament through the March 2024 tournament he competed under the shikona, or ring name, Kihō Tomotaka (輝鵬 智貴) before reverting to his legal name for the May 2024 tournament. He changed his name again to Hananofuji in January 2026.

== Early life and sumo background ==
Kawazoe hails from Udo, Kumamoto, the same hometown as the 8th yokozuna Shiranui Dakuemon and ōzeki Shōdai. When he was in nursery school, he took part in a local sumo tournament and recalls being thrown to the ground by a girl. Although they were fighting for fun, his ego was bruised and he vowed to continue sumo, eventually developing a passion for the sport as he became more and more involved in his club's activities. At that time, he met Kusano, two years his junior, who remained his friend and followed him to all his amateur clubs from kindergarten through university before also becoming a professional wrestler.

At high school, Kawazoe enrolled at Buntoku High School, a school with a good sumo club and several team and individual championship victories. There, he became a high school yokozuna at the national championships. In 2015, he won the Hakuhō Cup individual championship (junior high school competition), and cites this competition as the moment when he decided to join Miyagino stable, in particular to become stronger by training with wrestlers of the same calibre as him (such as Ishiura and Enhō). After graduating from high school, he joined Nihon University's sumo club, where he became the classmate of future makuuchi-ranked wrestler Takerufuji. There, he also won the title of student yokozuna in 2021, by defeating the reigning champion Hidetora Hanada at the All Japan College Championships. During his year at Nihon University, observers noted that he had quickly won the university's black mawashi, a symbol of the club's veteran wrestlers. During the same period, he however suffered a partially torn right Achilles tendon and a torn right hamstring, which delayed his decision to become a professional. With this last amateur yokozuna title, Kawazoe finally decided to turn pro, as he was still eligible to enter professional sumo using the makushita tsukedashi system. As expected, he joined Miyagino stable where his fellow Nihon University classmate Ōtani was already wrestling.

Formally recruited in September 2022, Kawazoe became the first new member of the Miyagino stable since Hakuhō took over the Miyagino elder share in July of that year. At the time of the inspection of the new recruits, at the end of August 2022, he was authorised to compete because of his prowess as an amateur. However, he received a comment from Isegahama (former yokozuna Asahifuji) who told him "even if you are a tsukedashi, you can't be tall enough."

== Career ==
=== Early career ===
During his early career, he wrestled under his real name Kawazoe (川副). Just as he was about to begin his first tournament, Kawazoe expressed his desire to compete against the former ōzeki Asanoyama, who was climbing back to the top division after his suspension, on Day 1 of the September 2022 tournament. Kawazoe nevertheless suffered a defeat but considered the match a good experience. However, Kawazoe was able to bounce back and win a kachi-koshi score. For a year, he wrestled in the makushita division without ever scoring a make-koshi record but without winning a championship either, which slowed his progression up the rankings. In March 2023, when he was ranked as makushita 3, he missed out on promotion to sekitori status.

=== Jūryō promotion ===
Following a 5–2 record as west makushita 1, Kawazoe earned a promotion to the jūryō division, along Yūma and Ukrainian Shishi, despite a fracture in the back of his left foot. On the occasion of his promotion it was announced that he would take the shikona, or ring name, Kihō (輝鵬). It was revealed that this ring name, chosen on the night of his fourth victory securing his promotion, was chosen by Kawazoe himself with the kanji for "shine" (輝) as he wishes to become a wrestler who shines ever brighter. His shikona first name, "Tomotaka" (智貴), is a combination of his father's Tomonori (智徳) and mother's Takayo (貴代). During the interview introducing the new jūryō wrestlers, the now Kihō expressed regret at having fallen behind the promotion records of his stablemate Hakuōhō, vowing to overtake him in the rankings. Upon promotion, Kihō became the smallest active sekitori, replacing his stablemate Enhō, and complementing Hokuseihō, another stablemate, who was the tallest sekitori at the time. At 115 kg (254 lb) he was also, along with Midorifuji, the lightest active sekitori.

Unusually, he took part in his first jūryō tournament with the iconic golden shimekomi of his coach Magaki (the former Ishiura). Speaking about this unusual situation, since wrestlers promoted to jūryō have their own competition mawashi custom-made, he explained that his silver shimekomi had only been delivered the day before the tournament, too late to use it. As he resolved himself to use his coach's, the observers saw it as a passing of the baton between Ishiura, who had just retired, and Kihō, who had just been promoted to jūryō; the two also sharing the same build and sumo style and Kihō declaring "I will do my best to carry on his will." On the seventh day of the tournament, Kihō faced amateur scene rival and Nishonoseki stable wrestler, Ōnosato, who fought in makushita. Kihō had never managed to beat Ōnosato on the amateur scene, and the latter had even stolen the college yokozuna title from him at the 2022 championships. Kihō nevertheless managed to defeat Ōnosato by hatakikomi and thus inflicted on him his second consecutive defeat, further delaying Ōnosato's promotion to jūryō.

On the eighth day of the same tournament, he received a keshō-mawashi from his former school Buntoku High School. As he won that day against Tsushimanada, he commented that this gift, designed by his former sumo coach, was a good omen for his tournament. On the eleventh day of the same tournament, Kihō, who was then recording a score of 7 wins, lost his match against Akua by the rare kimarite (winning technique) abisetaoshi, or 'backward force down'. Wounded during the fight, he had to be taken to the arena infirmary in a wheelchair, before submitting a medical certificate and declaring himself kyūjō the next day; mentioning a lisfranc injury requiring a month's treatment.

However, Kihō was listed among the wrestlers participating in the September 2023 tournament. In stable condition on his injured leg, he nevertheless injured his other leg on the first day of the tournament, when Ōnosato pushed his opponent Asakōryū out of the ring, the latter falling on top of Kihō. Now wrestling under painkillers in both legs due to torn muscles in both thighs, he won his second match over Shimanoumi the following day. On the twelfth day of the same tournament, however, Kihō had to declare himself absent for the second consecutive jūryō tournament, after suffering a right hamstring muscle tear during his match against Chiyomaru, requiring around a month's treatment. Due to his absence Kihō recorded an eighth defeat by default, increasing the risk of relegation to the makushita division.

=== Demotion and return ===
When the banzuke for the November tournament was announced, it was indeed confirmed that Kihō would lose his sekitori status. At the same time, it was announced that he had undergone reconstructive surgery to treat his lisfranc joint ligament injuries and his metatarsal fracture, injuries he had sustained earlier in the year. His period of remission, expected to be of long duration, led to comments about his possible relegation to the sandanme division. During his absence from the ring, it was confirmed that Kihō and all the wrestlers and coaches from Miyagino stable would be transferred to Isegahama stable for an indefinite period of time following the abuse case and the retirement of then-Miyagino's top ranker, Hokuseihō. On the occasion of the May 2024 tournament, Kihō changed his shikona, or ring name, returning to his legal name he used at the start of his career. Following the resignation and final retirement of his former master Miyagino (the 69th yokozuna Hakuhō) in June 2025, Kawazoe and the other members of the former Miyagino stable were instructed to remain under the tutelage of Isegahama stable.

In December 2025 it was announced that Kawazoe, along with most other wrestlers that moved from Miyagino stable to Isegahama stable, had changed his name to Hananofuji (花の富士) in line with the Isegahama tradition of using the fuji (富士) characters in one's shikona.

== Fighting style ==
Despite his small stature of 1.65 m (5 ft 5 in) tall and weighing 110 kg (240 lb), Kihō uses his momentum and flexible body as a weapon to perform a variety of techniques. A versatile wrestler, Kihō favores an unusual grip on his opponents' mawashi with a moro-zashi, or double underarm grip. Most of his wins are by frontal push out or force out. His master Miyagino said that even though "he is handicapped by his weight and height, he still fights on and wins" adding that Kihō "is fun to watch". Referring to Kihō's technical skills, Hakuhō also commented that he had the impression of seeing a "small Hakuhō" when Kihō wrestled. He is also known for his variety of techniques he uses at the tachi-ai.

== Personal life ==
Kihō is the only boy in his family and has two sisters.

== Career record ==
Hananofuji Keita
Year	January Hatsu basho, Tokyo	March Haru basho, Osaka	May Natsu basho, Tokyo	July Nagoya basho, Nagoya	September Aki basho, Tokyo	November Kyūshū basho, Fukuoka
2022	x	x	x	x	Makushita tsukedashi #15; 4–3	East Makushita #13; 5–2
2023	East Makushita #7; 5–2	West Makushita #3; 4–3	West Makushita #1; 5–2	West Jūryō #13; 7–5–3	East Jūryō #13; 4–8–3	East Makushita #2; Sat out due to injury 0–0–7
2024	West Makushita #42; Sat out due to injury 0–0–7	East Sandanme #23; Sat out due to injury 0–0–7	East Sandanme #84; 1–0–6	West Jonidan #23; 6–1	West Sandanme #51; 7–0; Champion	West Makushita #29; 1–0–6
2025	East Makushita #60; 5–2	East Makushita #39; 6–1	East Makushita #16; 1–4–2	East Makushita #41; Sat out due to injury 0–0–7	West Sandanme #21; Sat out due to injury 0–0–7	West Jonidan #1; 6–1
2026	East Sandanme #23; 7–0; Champion	East Makushita #15; 2–5	West Makushita #30; 3–4	West Makushita #40; 4–3	East Makushita #33; 4–3	East Makushita #26; 3–4
Record given as wins–losses–absences Top division champion Top division runner-up Retired Non-participation Jūryō Lower divisions Sanshō key: F=Fighting spirit; O=Outstanding performance; T=Technique Also shown: ★=Kinboshi; P=Playoff(s); Divisions: Makuuchi — Jūryō — Makushita — Sandanme — Jonidan — Jonokuchi Makuuchi ranks: Yokozuna — Ōzeki — Sekiwake — Komusubi — Maegashira

== See also ==
- Glossary of sumo terms
- List of active sumo wrestlers
