= Chikubayama Masakuni =

Japanese sumo wrestler

Personal information
- Native name: 竹葉山 真邦
- Born: Tazaki Makoto; August 21, 1957 (age 69) Ukiha, Fukuoka, Japan
- Height: 1.76 m (5 ft 9 in)
- Weight: 116 kg (256 lb; 18.3 st)

Sport
- Sport: Sumo
- Retired: January 1989
- Heya: Miyagino
- Record: 442–402–21
- Debut: March 1973
- Highest rank: Maegashira 13 (September 1986)
- Elder name: Miyagino → Magaki
- Championships: 1 (Jūryō)
- Updated on 28 July 2022

Chikubayama Masakuni (born August 21, 1957, as Makoto Tazaki) is a former sumo wrestler from Ukiha, Fukuoka, Japan. He made his professional debut in 1973, breaking into the top makuuchi division thirteen years later in 1986. His highest rank was maegashira 13. After retiring in 1989 he became an elder of the Japan Sumo Association. He was the head coach of the Miyagino stable and his most successful wrestler is yokozuna Hakuhō.

== Career ==
He did sumo from a young age but played baseball at junior high school as there was no sumo team available. He joined Miyagino stable after graduation. His ring name (shikona) was named after former yokozuna Yoshibayama, his stablemaster, and it also references Chikugo, Fukuoka. His active career was relatively modest. He made his professional debut in March 1973 (alongside future sekiwake Kōbōyama), using his real name of Tazaki as his shikona. In March 1974 upon promotion to the sandanme division he became Chikubayama. He first reached sekitori status in November 1978 when he was promoted to the jūryō division but he lasted only one tournament, falling back to the unsalaried ranks. It took over four years, until January 1983, for him to win promotion back to jūryō and again he had a losing record and was demoted after only one tournament. After regular and intense training sessions with top division wrestler Kaiki of the Tomozuna stable he won promotion for the third time in March 1984, and finally established himself in jūryō. However he did not reach the top makuuchi division until September 1986, 81 tournaments after his professional debut – the second slowest ever at the time. He spent only two tournaments in the top division, peaking at maegashira 13. He was small compared to his contemporaries, at just 1.76 m (5 ft 9 in) tall and weighing around 116 kg (256 lb; 18.3 st).

== Retirement from sumo ==
He retired from being an active wrestler in January 1989 and became an elder of the Japan Sumo Association under the name Nakagawa. However, following the sudden death in June of the same year of the head of the Miyagino stable (the former Hirokawa) he became the Miyagino stablemaster. The first sekitori he produced was Kengaku in 1991, followed by Wakahayato in 1994 and Kōbō in 1999. In December 2000 he recruited future yokozuna Hakuhō, after making a promise to then maegashira Kyokushūzan of the affiliated Ōshima stable, who had invited his fellow Mongolian to Japan for trials. No other stable would take Hakuhō, as he weighed just 62 kg (137 lb; 9.8 st). at the time. However, after making his debut in March 2001 at the age of 16, Hakuhō trained hard and gained weight and muscle, and reached jūryō in January 2004.

He was forced to give up the Miyagino name and head coach position in August 2004 when it was acquired by the former Kanechika (he had apparently only been renting it from the widow of the previous coach), but he remained in the stable under the name Kumagatani, and was still regarded as Hakuhō's mentor. In December 2010 he regained the Miyagino name and status of head coach after Kanechika was demoted by the Japan Sumo Association for being caught on tape discussing alleged match-fixing. Miyagino has also coached Ryūō, Daikihō, Ishiura and Enhō to the top division.

In April 2019 Miyagino was given a ten percent pay cut for three months by the Sumo Association, in response to Hakuhō's breach of etiquette on the final day of the March 2019 tournament, when he led a sanbon jime to mark the end of the Heisei era, despite the day's ceremonies not being completed.

In July 2022 the Sumo Association announced that, in light of Miyagino reaching 65 years of age, Magaki-oyakata (former yokozuna Hakuhō) and Chikubayama would be exchanging elder-stocks, with Hakuhō becoming the 13th Miyagino and becoming the stablemaster at the stable and Chikubayama becoming the 22nd Magaki. He remained as a coach at Miyagino stable in a consultancy role until 1 June 2023. Upon the retirement of former maegashira Ishiura Shikanosuke, it was announced that Chikubayama ceded his elder name to Ishiura and would leave the Sumo Association prior to completing his five-year role as consultant.

== Fighting style ==
Chikubayama was a tsuki-oshi specialist who preferred pushing and thrusting techniques and did not like to fight on the mawashi or belt. He won most of his bouts by a straightforward oshi-dashi or push out.

== Career record ==
Chikubayama Masakuni
| Year | January Hatsu basho, Tokyo | March Haru basho, Osaka | May Natsu basho, Tokyo | July Nagoya basho, Nagoya | September Aki basho, Tokyo | November Kyūshū basho, Fukuoka |
|---|---|---|---|---|---|---|
| 1973 | x | (Maezumo) | West Jonokuchi #6; 5–2 | West Jonidan #54; 5–2 | West Jonidan #9; 3–4 | West Jonidan #25; 3–4 |
| 1974 | East Jonidan #36; 6–1 | East Sandanme #76; 5–2 | East Sandanme #49; 3–4 | West Sandanme #58; 3–4 | East Sandanme #69; 5–2 | West Sandanme #36; 3–4 |
| 1975 | East Sandanme #46; 3–4 | East Sandanme #55; 1–6 | East Jonidan #5; 4–3 | East Sandanme #68; 3–4 | West Jonidan #1; 4–3 | West Sandanme #62; 3–4 |
| 1976 | West Jonidan #1; 4–3 | West Sandanme #64; 4–3 | West Sandanme #47; 6–1 | West Sandanme #7; 2–5 | East Sandanme #31; 4–3 | West Sandanme #18; 6–1 |
| 1977 | Makushita #41; 2–5 | West Sandanme #3; 4–3 | East Makushita #52; 4–3 | East Makushita #40; 3–4 | East Makushita #47; 5–2 | West Makushita #30; 4–3 |
| 1978 | West Makushita #25; 3–4 | East Makushita #32; 4–3 | West Makushita #24; 5–2 | West Makushita #12; 6–1 | West Makushita #2; 4–3 | East Jūryō #13; 6–9 |
| 1979 | East Makushita #4; 3–4 | East Makushita #10; 4–3 | East Makushita #6; 3–4 | East Makushita #12; 1–6 | East Makushita #38; 5–2 | East Makushita #23; 5–2 |
| 1980 | East Makushita #12; 4–3 | West Makushita #9; 2–5 | West Makushita #24; 4–3 | West Makushita #16; 3–4 | West Makushita #25; 3–4 | West Makushita #37; 6–1 |
| 1981 | West Makushita #14; 4–3 | West Makushita #10; 3–4 | West Makushita #17; 4–3 | West Makushita #9; 4–3 | West Makushita #7; 3–4 | West Makushita #11; 5–2 |
| 1982 | West Makushita #4; 2–5 | West Makushita #17; 3–4 | East Makushita #28; 6–1–P | West Makushita #8; 4–3 | East Makushita #6; 4–3 | East Makushita #4; 4–3 |
| 1983 | West Jūryō #13; 7–8 | West Makushita #3; 1–6 | West Makushita #26; 2–5 | West Makushita #41; 5–2 | West Makushita #23; 5–2 | West Makushita #10; 5–2 |
| 1984 | West Makushita #2; 4–3 | East Jūryō #13; 8–7 | West Jūryō #9; 9–6 | East Jūryō #4; 8–7 | East Jūryō #2; 7–8 | East Jūryō #4; 5–10 |
| 1985 | East Jūryō #9; 4–5–6 | East Makushita #2; Sat out due to injury 0–0–7 | East Makushita #2; 5–2 | West Jūryō #10; 8–7 | West Jūryō #9; 8–7 | East Jūryō #8; 9–6 |
| 1986 | East Jūryō #3; 4–4–7 | East Jūryō #12; 9–6 | West Jūryō #8; 11–4; Champion | East Jūryō #1; 8–7 | East Maegashira #13; 6–9 | West Jūryō #4; 10–5–P |
| 1987 | East Maegashira #14; 5–10 | West Jūryō #4; 8–7 | East Jūryō #4; 8–7 | East Jūryō #2; 7–8 | West Jūryō #4; 7–8 | West Jūryō #5; 6–9 |
| 1988 | West Jūryō #10; 7–8 | East Jūryō #12; 6–9 | West Makushita #2; 4–3 | East Makushita #1; 3–4 | East Makushita #6; 2–5 | East Makushita #22; 5–2 |
| 1989 | East Makushita #10; Retired; 2–4–1 | x | x | x | x | x |
Record given as wins–losses–absences Top division champion Top division runner-up Retired Lower divisions Non-participation Sanshō key: F=Fighting spirit; O=Outstanding performance; T=Technique Also shown: ★=Kinboshi; P=Playoff(s); Divisions: Makuuchi — Jūryō — Makushita — Sandanme — Jonidan — Jonokuchi Makuuchi ranks: Yokozuna — Ōzeki — Sekiwake — Komusubi — Maegashira

== See also ==
- Glossary of sumo terms
- List of past sumo wrestlers
- List of sumo elders
- List of sumo tournament second division champions
