= Daishin Noboru =

Sumo wrestler

Daishin Noboru (born August 2, 1937 as Tomeo Nagata; died March 20, 2012) was a sumo wrestler from Oshamambe, Hokkaidō, Japan. His highest rank was maegashira 8. He was an original member of the Miyagino stable founded by yokozuna Yoshibayama. He made his professional debut in May 1956, reaching the top makuuchi division in July 1965. He won the jūryō division championship or yūshō in May 1966. He retired in March 1969.

== See also ==
- List of sumo tournament second division champions
