= Myōbudani Kiyoshi =

Japanese sumo wrestler (1937–2024)

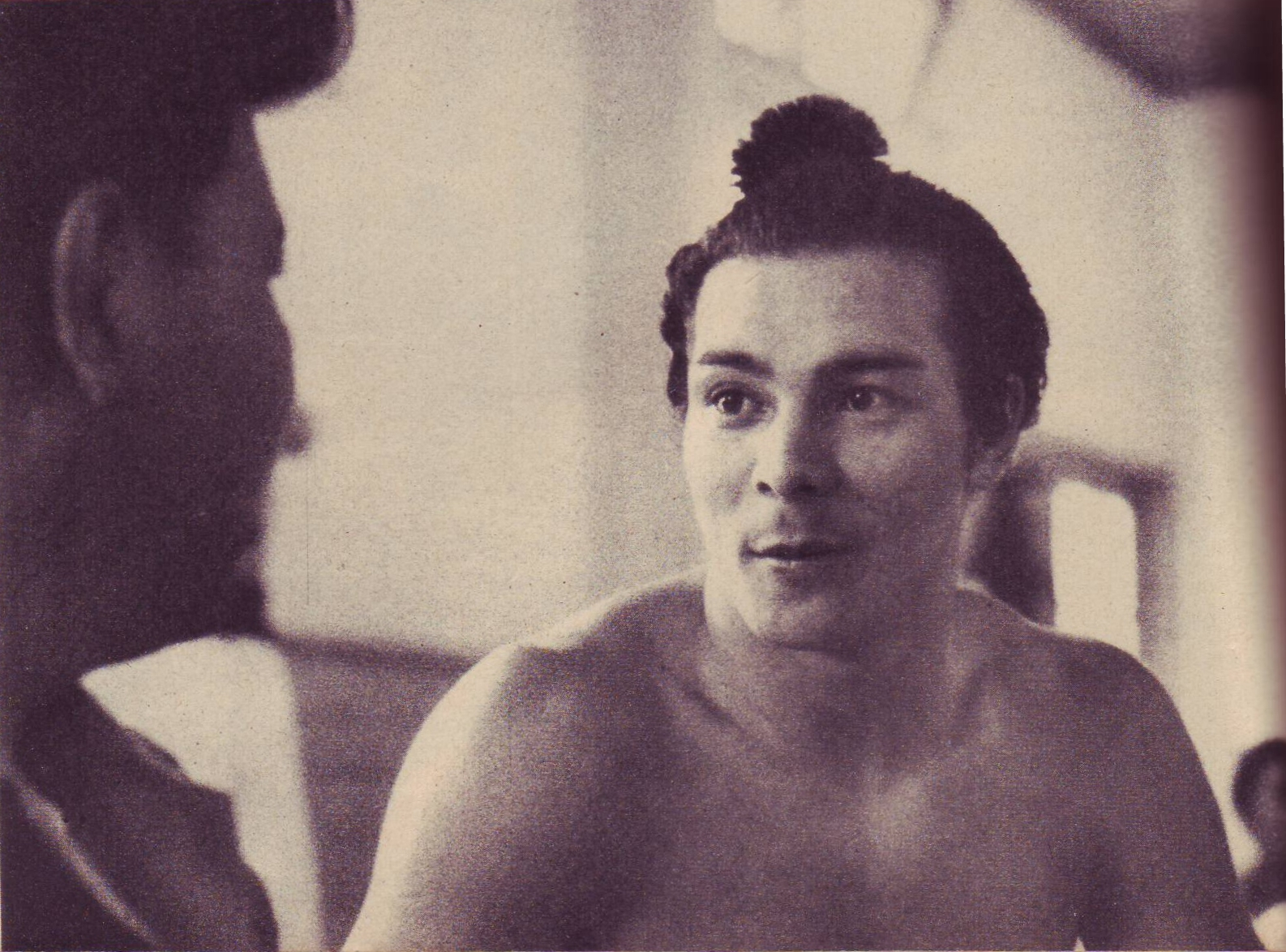
- Kiyoshi, c. 1959

Personal information
- Native name: 明武谷 清
- Born: Myōbudani Kiyoshi; 29 April 1937 Akan, Hokkaido, Japan
- Died: 10 March 2024 (aged 86)
- Height: 1.89 m (6 ft 2 1/2 in)
- Weight: 113 kg (249 lb; 17.8 st)

Sport
- Sport: Sumo
- Retired: November 1969
- Heya: Takashima → Miyagino
- Record: 624-580-6
- Debut: March 1954
- Highest rank: Sekiwake (November 1964)
- Elder name: Nakamura
- Championships: 1 (Jonidan)
- Special Prizes: Outstanding Performance (4); Fighting Spirit (4)
- Gold Stars: 3 Taihō (2); Sadanoyama
- Updated on June 2020

Myōbudani Kiyoshi (明歩谷 清; 29 April 1937 – 10 March 2024) was a Japanese sumo wrestler from Akan, Hokkaido. He was a member of Miyagino stable. His highest rank was sekiwake and he twice took part in playoffs for the top makuuchi division tournament championship or yūshō. He was also a runner-up in two other tournaments. He earned eight sanshō, or special prizes, for his achievements in tournaments; four for Outstanding Performance and four for Fighting Spirit. He also earned three kinboshi, or gold stars, for defeating yokozuna. After his retirement in 1969 he was an elder of the Japan Sumo Association but left the sumo world in 1977 to become a Jehovah's Witness.

== Career ==
Kiyoshi came from a family of farmers in Akan, Hokkaido. Already 1.76 m (5 ft 9 1/2 in) tall by the sixth grade of elementary school he was strong enough to help with the family business, but he had ambitions to become a sumo wrestler. In 1953 the yokozuna Haguroyama and Yoshibayama visited the area, and he decided to join Yoshibayama's Takashima stable. He made his professional debut in March 1954. When Yoshibayama set up his own stable whilst still active, Myōbudani went with him, and this stable later evolved into Miyagino stable after Yoshibayama's retirement. He reached the jūryō division in November 1957 and was promoted to the top makuuchi division in July 1959. He initially struggled at this level, being demoted back to jūryō a couple of times and not making a kachi-koshi or majority of wins against losses in makuuchi until November 1960, when he made an effort to be more aggressive on the dohyō.

In September 1961 he was a runner-up in a top division tournament for the first time, taking part in an unusual three-way playoff for the yūshō or championship against Kashiwado and Taihō, losing to both and with Taihō emerging as the winner. After this tournament he was promoted to the sanyaku ranks for the first time at komusubi, although he was unable to maintain the rank. His fighting name or shikona had always been his own surname in combination with a variety of given names, but he changed it to Yoshibanada in January 1963 in honour of his stablemaster Yoshibayama. The change proved unsuccessful and he reverted to Myōbudani after only four tournaments. He earned his first kinboshi or win over a yokozuna as a maegashira in May 1964, and reached sekiwake in November 1964. After winning a sanshō or special prize in four consecutive tournaments from July 1964 to January 1965 there was speculation that he could reach ozeki, but it was not to be. Nonetheless he was runner-up in May 1965, and took part in another playoff, against Kashiwado in September 1965. He made his last sanyaku appearance in July 1967, and was a runner-up for the fourth and final time in September 1968. His overall top division record was 414 wins against 450 losses with 6 absences, a winning percentage of 48%.

== Retirement from sumo ==
Kiyoshi retired in November 1969, and became a toshiyori or elder of the Japan Sumo Association, under the name Nakamura. He worked as a coach at Miyagino stable and invited members of the Clark Hatch Fitness Center, where he had trained as an active wrestler, to take part in training sessions at Miyagino. He was also a judge of tournament bouts. He left the Sumo Association in 1977. In the same year, influenced by his wife he became a Jehovah's Witness, whose teachings forbid the practice of martial arts. He moved to Funabashi and conducted missionary work while also employed at a building cleaning service. His biography can be found in the magazine Awake!, 8 June 1983.

Myōbudani died on 10 March 2024, at the age of 86. His family, who had announced the news, wished to hold the funeral within the strict family circle.

== Fighting style ==
Although Myōbudani was of relatively light weight for a sumo wrestler, he was tall and powerful, his speciality being tsuri-dashi or lift out. He used this kimarite more than any other, followed by yori-kiri (force out) and utchari (ring edge throw). His slim, muscular build meant he was popular with female fans.

== Career record ==
- The Kyushu tournament was first held in 1957, and the Nagoya tournament in 1958.

Myōbudani Kiyoshi
Year	January Hatsu basho, Tokyo	March Haru basho, Osaka	May Natsu basho, Tokyo	July Nagoya basho, Nagoya	September Aki basho, Tokyo	November Kyūshū basho, Fukuoka
1954	x	Shinjo; 3–0	East Jonidan #52; 3–5	Not held	West Jonidan #54; 6–2	Not held
1955	West Jonidan #21; 3–5	East Jonidan #25; 8–0–P; Champion	West Sandanme #47; 5–3	Not held	East Sandanme #25; 5–3	Not held
1956	West Sandanme #7; 7–1	East Makushita #49; 5–3	East Makushita #42; 6–2	Not held	East Makushita #32; 6–2	Not held
1957	East Makushita #20; 4–4	East Makushita #19; 5–3	East Makushita #13; 6–2	Not held	East Makushita #3; 5–3	West Jūryō #23; 8–7
1958	West Jūryō #22; 9–6	East Jūryō #17; 7–8	West Jūryō #18; 11–4–P	East Jūryō #8; 8–7	West Jūryō #6; 8–7	East Jūryō #6; 6–9
1959	East Jūryō #9; 9–6	East Jūryō #6; 11–4	East Jūryō #3; 10–5	West Maegashira #18; 7–8	West Jūryō #2; 12–3	East Maegashira #12; 6–9
1960	East Maegashira #15; 5–10	East Jūryō #2; 6–9	West Jūryō #4; 9–6	West Jūryō #1; 9–6	West Jūryō #1; 10–5	East Maegashira #13; 8–7
1961	East Maegashira #10; 8–7	East Maegashira #5; 5–10	East Maegashira #9; 7–8	West Maegashira #10; 9–6	West Maegashira #4; 12–3–PP; F	West Komusubi #2; 6–9
1962	East Maegashira #4; 6–9	East Maegashira #8; 7–8	East Maegashira #7; 9–6	East Maegashira #3; 2–13	West Maegashira #9; 8–7	West Maegashira #7; 11–4
1963	East Maegashira #1; 5–10	West Maegashira #3; 5–10	West Maegashira #6; 5–10	West Maegashira #11; 9–6	West Maegashira #6; 8–7	West Maegashira #3; 7–8
1964	West Maegashira #4; 8–7	West Komusubi #1; 7–8	West Maegashira #1; 7–8 ★	West Maegashira #1; 8–7; O★	East Maegashira #1; 8–7; F	East Sekiwake #1; 8–7; O
1965	East Sekiwake #1; 9–6; O	East Sekiwake #1; 4–11	East Maegashira #4; 11–4	East Komusubi #1; 4–11	East Maegashira #5; 12–3–P; F	West Komusubi #2; 9–6; O
1966	West Komusubi #1; 9–6	West Sekiwake #1; 7–8	West Komusubi #1; 6–9	West Maegashira #2; 5–10	East Maegashira #5; 5–10	East Maegashira #8; 8–7
1967	West Maegashira #4; 11–4; F	East Komusubi #1; 9–6	East Sekiwake #1; 7–8	East Komusubi #2; 7–8	West Maegashira #1; 7–8	West Maegashira #1; 5–10 ★
1968	East Maegashira #6; 7–8	West Maegashira #7; 8–7	West Maegashira #4; 9–6	East Maegashira #2; 4–8–3	East Maegashira #7; 11–4	East Maegashira #2; 5–10
1969	West Maegashira #5; 6–9	East Maegashira #7; 5–10	West Maegashira #11; 9–6	East Maegashira #7; 7–8	East Maegashira #8; 7–8	West Maegashira #9; Retired; 0–12–3
Record given as wins–losses–absences Top division champion Top division runner-up Retired Lower divisions Non-participation Sanshō key: F=Fighting spirit; O=Outstanding performance; T=Technique Also shown: ★=Kinboshi; P=Playoff(s); Divisions: Makuuchi — Jūryō — Makushita — Sandanme — Jonidan — Jonokuchi Makuuchi ranks: Yokozuna — Ōzeki — Sekiwake — Komusubi — Maegashira

== See also ==
- List of past sumo wrestlers
- Glossary of sumo terms
- List of sekiwake
- List of sumo tournament top division runners-up
