= Kanechika Kazunori =

Japanese sumo wrestler

Personal information
- Native name: 金親 和行
- Born: Kazuyuki Kanechika; 12 November 1969 (age 56) Tsurumi-ku, Yokohama, Kanagawa, Japan
- Height: 1.81 m (5 ft 11 1/2 in)
- Weight: 161 kg (355 lb)

Sport
- Sport: Sumo
- Retired: September, 2004
- Heya: Mihogaseki → Kitanoumi
- Record: 491-481-11
- Debut: September, 1985
- Highest rank: Jūryō 2 (January, 1995)
- Elder name: Miyagino
- Updated on June 2020

Kanechika Kazunori (born 12 November 1969 as Kazuyuki Kanechika, also known as Kasuyuki Yamamura) is a former sumo wrestler and coach from Tsurumi, Yokohama, Kanagawa, Japan.

== Sumo career ==
He was fond of basketball while at junior high school. His father remarried and Kanechika had a poor relationship with his stepmother, which was one reason why he quit high school to enter sumo. He was recruited by the recently retired yokozuna Kitanoumi, who was looking to open his own training stable. Kanechika made his professional debut in September 1985, fighting under his own surname. Upon promotion to the sekitori level in March 1992 he changed his shikona to Gassan, but soon reverted to Kanechika after a run of bad results. He never reached the top division, his highest rank being jūryō 2 in January 1995. He was demoted from the jūryō division in 1998 and spent the last six years of his career in the unsalaried makushita and sandanme divisions. In November 1999 he had a win over future yokozuna Asashōryū, when both were ranked in makushita.

== Fighting style ==
He favoured a left-hand outside, right-hand inside grip on his opponents' mawashi or belt, and his favourite technique was shitatenage, or underarm throw.

== Coaching career ==
By July 2004 Kanechika had decided to retire and he initially had no ambition to stay in sumo, intending to open a noodle shop. However, in September he unexpectedly became an elder in the Japan Sumo Association. Although he had only 24 tournaments ranked as a sekitori, below the usual requirement of 30, he was able to become head coach of Miyagino stable by inheriting the Miyagino toshiyori-kabu, or elder stock through marrying the daughter of a previous holder, former komusubi Hirokawa (who had died in 1989). Wrestlers inheriting a stable in this way are permitted to have a lower threshold of 12 tournaments in makuuchi or 20 tournaments as a sekitori. Kanechika was also adopted by the widow and therefore changed his legal name to Kazuyuki Yamamura. The head coach of Miyagino at the time, former maegashira Chikubayama, was forced to step aside as he only had the Miyagino stock on loan from Hirokawa's widow (though this fact had not been widely known). Chikubayama was able to become Kumagatani-oyakata and still be affiliated to the stable. Kanechika, unusually, had no previous connection to the stable, having been a member of Kitanoumi stable which is from an entirely different ichimon or stable group when he took over the stable and the Miyagino elder name. After this controversial takeover the Sumo Association changed the rules so that former wrestlers who only have elder stock on loan, as Chikubayama did, cannot become stablemasters. Chikubayama was the mentor of Hakuhō, who had just entered the top division at the time, and he continued to be Hakuhō's primary trainer. Kanechika, though he was now head as Miyagino, was rarely seen at training sessions.

=== Match-fixing scandal ===
Miyagino was forced to resign as head coach by the Sumo Association in December 2010, after being caught on tape discussing match-fixing. The allegations had first been reported in the tabloid magazine Shūkan Gendai in June 2007, but it was not until two years later that the tape itself surfaced, during the former chairman of the Sumo Association Kitanoumi's lawsuit against the magazine in the Tokyo District Court. Miyagino admitted that it was his voice on the tape, but that he was just "talking nonsense." Nevertheless, he accepted the Sumo Association's "recommendation" that he swap elder names with former head coach Chikubayama, who resumed head coach duties, and became known as Kumagatani-oyakata.

=== Assault charge ===
In September 2015 he was arrested in connection with an assault with a metal bat on his personal assistant and driver. He was indicted by the prosecutor's office on 18 September for inflicting bodily injury, and fired by the Sumo Association on 1 October. He reportedly admitted in court in November 2015 to physical and verbal abuse of the victim on a number of occasions. In addition to the beatings, these also include forcing the victim to eat a whole tub of wasabi paste and stuffing a towel into his mouth. In a subsequent court hearing in February 2016 the victim gave further testimony and indicated he would not accept a settlement. On 25 March 2016 Kanechika was sentenced to three years imprisonment, suspended for four years. He has also paid the victim 1.53 million yen.

== Career record ==
Kanechika Kazunori
Year	January Hatsu basho, Tokyo	March Haru basho, Osaka	May Natsu basho, Tokyo	July Nagoya basho, Nagoya	September Aki basho, Tokyo	November Kyūshū basho, Fukuoka
1985	x	x	x	x	(Maezumo)	East Jonokuchi #45; 4–3
1986	West Jonokuchi #11; 5–2	East Jonidan #103; 5–2	West Jonidan #71; 3–4	East Jonidan #92; 3–4	East Jonidan #106; 4–3	West Jonidan #79; 4–3
1987	East Jonidan #54; 6–1	West Sandanme #92; 4–3	East Sandanme #78; 4–3	East Sandanme #61; 4–3	East Sandanme #46; 4–3	West Sandanme #28; 3–4
1988	West Sandanme #41; 2–5	West Sandanme #70; 4–3	East Sandanme #51; 6–1	East Sandanme #4; 6–1	East Makushita #35; 4–3	East Makushita #25; 2–5
1989	East Makushita #46; 4–3	West Makushita #37; 5–2	West Makushita #22; 2–5	East Makushita #40; 4–3	West Makushita #27; 1–2–4	East Makushita #57; Sat out due to injury 0–0–7
1990	East Makushita #57; 2–5	East Sandanme #24; 6–1	East Makushita #47; 3–4	West Sandanme #3; 6–1	East Makushita #33; 2–5	West Makushita #48; 5–2
1991	West Makushita #28; 2–5	West Makushita #44; 4–3	West Makushita #36; 4–3	West Makushita #24; 5–2	West Makushita #13; 6–1	East Makushita #4; 4–3
1992	East Makushita #2; 5–2	West Jūryō #10; 4–11	East Makushita #5; 4–3	East Makushita #1; 3–4	West Makushita #4; 2–5	East Makushita #18; 4–3
1993	East Makushita #13; 5–2	West Makushita #5; 3–4	East Makushita #11; 4–3	East Makushita #7; 5–2	West Makushita #1; 4–3	West Jūryō #13; 8–7
1994	East Jūryō #9; 7–8	East Jūryō #10; 8–7	East Jūryō #8; 8–7	East Jūryō #5; 6–9	East Jūryō #8; 8–7	East Jūryō #5; 8–7
1995	West Jūryō #2; 6–9	West Jūryō #6; 9–6	West Jūryō #2; 8–7	East Jūryō #2; 5–10	East Jūryō #6; 8–7	East Jūryō #5; 6–9
1996	East Jūryō #8; 9–6	West Jūryō #6; 6–9	East Jūryō #10; 9–6	East Jūryō #4; 6–9	West Jūryō #7; 7–8	East Jūryō #10; 5–10
1997	East Makushita #2; 3–4	East Makushita #7; 4–3	West Makushita #4; 5–2	East Makushita #1; 4–3	East Jūryō #13; 8–7	West Jūryō #8; 7–8
1998	West Jūryō #10; 7–8	West Jūryō #11; 4–11	East Makushita #4; 2–5	East Makushita #14; 1–6	East Makushita #37; 5–2	East Makushita #23; 4–3
1999	West Makushita #15; 3–4	East Makushita #22; 3–4	West Makushita #30; 4–3	East Makushita #23; 4–3	East Makushita #16; 4–3	West Makushita #12; 5–2
2000	East Makushita #5; 3–4	West Makushita #9; 2–5	East Makushita #22; 2–5	West Makushita #38; 3–4	West Makushita #51; 5–2	West Makushita #30; 5–2
2001	West Makushita #18; 2–5	West Makushita #33; 5–2	East Makushita #22; 3–4	West Makushita #33; 4–3	West Makushita #26; 2–5	West Makushita #41; 6–1
2002	West Makushita #17; 3–4	West Makushita #26; 2–5	West Makushita #43; 4–3	West Makushita #35; 3–4	West Makushita #48; 3–4	West Makushita #57; 4–3
2003	West Makushita #48; 1–6	East Sandanme #19; 4–3	East Sandanme #8; 4–3	East Makushita #58; 3–4	West Sandanme #10; 3–4	West Sandanme #25; 4–3
2004	West Sandanme #11; 2–5	East Sandanme #36; 3–4	East Sandanme #51; 4–3	West Sandanme #34; 3–4	East Sandanme #52; Retired; 0–0–0	x
Record given as wins–losses–absences Top division champion Top division runner-up Retired Lower divisions Non-participation Sanshō key: F=Fighting spirit; O=Outstanding performance; T=Technique Also shown: ★=Kinboshi; P=Playoff(s); Divisions: Makuuchi — Jūryō — Makushita — Sandanme — Jonidan — Jonokuchi Makuuchi ranks: Yokozuna — Ōzeki — Sekiwake — Komusubi — Maegashira

== See also ==
- Glossary of sumo terms
- List of past sumo wrestlers
