= Kōbō Kenichi =

Sumo wrestler (1973–2021)

Personal information
- Native name: 光法 賢一
- Born: Kenichi Mineyama; August 18, 1973 Minamitane, Kagoshima, Japan
- Died: July 2, 2021 (aged 47) Nagoya, Japan
- Height: 1.81 m (5 ft 11 in)
- Weight: 136 kg (300 lb)

Sport
- Sport: Sumo
- Retired: January 2008
- Heya: Miyagino
- Record: 582-572-14
- Debut: March, 1989
- Highest rank: Maegashira 9 (January 2002)
- Elder name: See retirement
- Championships: 1 (Jonokuchi)
- Updated on June 2020

Kōbō Kenichi (born as Kenichi Mineyama; August 18, 1973 – July 2, 2021) was a Japanese sumo wrestler. His highest rank was maegashira 9.

== Career ==
Kōbō made his professional debut in March 1989 at the age of 15. He worked his way quickly through the lowest three divisions, making his makushita debut shortly after his 18th birthday, less than three years into his career. However, he was unable to advance further for several years, reaching sekitori status only in January 1999 upon promotion to the second highest jūryō division, after nearly ten years of toiling in the lower divisions.

He reached the top makuuchi division for the first time in November 2001 but only lasted two tournaments before being demoted. He returned on two other occasions but he largely remained a veteran of the jūryō division, in which he spent 44 tournaments. For a long period he was the highest ranking wrestler in Miyagino stable, before the emergence of Hakuho, now a yokozuna. In July 2007, he fell to the unsalaried makushita division for the first time since September 2000, and he announced his retirement in December of that year.

== Retirement from sumo and death ==
Kōbō remained with the Japan Sumo Association as an elder under the name Ajigawa-oyakata, and initially worked as a coach at his old stable. In May 2008, he had his danpatsu-shiki, or official retirement ceremony, at the Ryogoku Kokugikan. In February 2010 he admitted that, against the wishes of the Tatsunami ichimon, he voted for independent candidate Takanohana instead of the approved candidate Ōshima in the elections to the Sumo Association's board. He offered his resignation, but was persuaded to stay. Following the controversy he moved to the Takanohana stable where he coached under the name Nishiiwa-oyakata, which was owned by the active wrestler Wakanosato. In July 2015, with Wakanosato likely to retire, he switched to the Otowayama name formerly owned by the late Takanonami and subsequently controlled by Takanohana Oyakata. He left the Sumo Association in January 2018 after the Otowayama kabu was needed by ex-maegashira Daido (formerly Onogawa Oyakata).

Kōbō died from COVID-19 on July 2, 2021, at the age of 47.

== Fighting style ==
Kōbō's favoured kimarite or techniques were hidari-yotsu (a right hand outside, left hand inside grip on the opponent's mawashi), shitatenage (underarm throw), and yorikiri (force out).

== Career record ==
Kōbō Kenichi
Year	January Hatsu basho, Tokyo	March Haru basho, Osaka	May Natsu basho, Tokyo	July Nagoya basho, Nagoya	September Aki basho, Tokyo	November Kyūshū basho, Fukuoka
1989	x	(Maezumo)	West Jonokuchi #8; 7–0; Champion	East Jonidan #46; 4–3	West Jonidan #20; 3–4	West Jonidan #38; 3–4
1990	West Jonidan #60; 4–3	East Jonidan #26; 3–4	West Jonidan #46; 6–1	West Sandanme #86; 4–3	West Sandanme #63; 4–3	East Sandanme #40; 4–3
1991	West Sandanme #25; 3–4	West Sandanme #40; 5–2	East Sandanme #11; 3–4	West Sandanme #24; 5–2	West Makushita #58; 4–3	West Makushita #44; 5–2
1992	West Makushita #29; 4–3	West Makushita #22; 4–3	East Makushita #18; 4–3	East Makushita #10; 3–4	West Makushita #14; 3–4	East Makushita #20; 5–2
1993	East Makushita #9; 3–4	East Makushita #15; 4–3	East Makushita #10; 4–3	West Makushita #6; 4–3	East Makushita #3; 3–4	East Makushita #7; 2–5
1994	West Makushita #22; 4–3	West Makushita #16; 4–3	East Makushita #12; 4–3	East Makushita #8; 4–3	West Makushita #6; 2–5	East Makushita #19; 1–6
1995	West Makushita #48; 5–2	West Makushita #28; 3–4	East Makushita #40; 4–3	East Makushita #32; 4–3	West Makushita #25; 4–3	East Makushita #19; 4–3
1996	East Makushita #14; 3–4	West Makushita #24; 5–2	East Makushita #12; 3–4	East Makushita #19; 3–4	East Makushita #28; 1–6	West Makushita #54; 6–1
1997	East Makushita #27; 3–4	West Makushita #36; 5–2	West Makushita #21; 5–2	East Makushita #10; 5–2	East Makushita #5; 2–5	East Makushita #18; 4–3
1998	East Makushita #13; 3–4	East Makushita #23; 2–5	East Makushita #40; 6–1	West Makushita #18; 5–2	East Makushita #11; 6–1	West Makushita #2; 5–2
1999	East Jūryō #12; 9–6	East Jūryō #6; 8–7	West Jūryō #4; 5–10	West Jūryō #9; 9–6	East Jūryō #6; 6–9	East Jūryō #10; 7–8
2000	West Jūryō #11; 7–8	East Jūryō #12; 1–7–7	East Makushita #13; Sat out due to injury 0–0–7	East Makushita #13; 6–1	East Makushita #3; 4–3	East Jūryō #12; 10–5
2001	West Jūryō #4; 5–10	West Jūryō #8; 8–7	East Jūryō #6; 8–7	West Jūryō #1; 8–7	East Jūryō #1; 8–7	East Maegashira #14; 8–7
2002	West Maegashira #9; 3–12	East Jūryō #2; 5–10	West Jūryō #6; 7–8	West Jūryō #7; 10–5	East Jūryō #4; 8–7	East Jūryō #3; 9–6
2003	East Maegashira #14; 5–10	East Jūryō #2; 7–8	West Jūryō #3; 7–8	West Jūryō #4; 7–8	West Jūryō #5; 8–7	West Jūryō #3; 8–7
2004	West Jūryō #1; 7–8	East Jūryō #3; 9–6	East Maegashira #17; 5–10	West Jūryō #4; 5–10	West Jūryō #9; 10–5	East Jūryō #4; 7–8
2005	East Jūryō #5; 6–9	East Jūryō #7; 6–9	East Jūryō #9; 7–8	East Jūryō #10; 9–6	West Jūryō #6; 6–9	East Jūryō #9; 7–8
2006	East Jūryō #10; 6–9	East Jūryō #13; 9–6	West Jūryō #9; 9–6	West Jūryō #6; 5–10	West Jūryō #10; 8–7	East Jūryō #9; 6–9
2007	East Jūryō #12; 9–6	East Jūryō #9; 6–9	East Jūryō #12; 6–9	East Makushita #2; 4–3	West Makushita #1; 2–5	West Makushita #9; 2–5
2008	West Makushita #20; Retired –	x	x	x	x	x
Record given as wins–losses–absences Top division champion Top division runner-up Retired Lower divisions Non-participation Sanshō key: F=Fighting spirit; O=Outstanding performance; T=Technique Also shown: ★=Kinboshi; P=Playoff(s); Divisions: Makuuchi — Jūryō — Makushita — Sandanme — Jonidan — Jonokuchi Makuuchi ranks: Yokozuna — Ōzeki — Sekiwake — Komusubi — Maegashira

== See also ==
- Glossary of sumo terms
- List of past sumo wrestlers
- List of sumo elders
