= Yoshibayama Junnosuke =

Japanese sumo wrestler

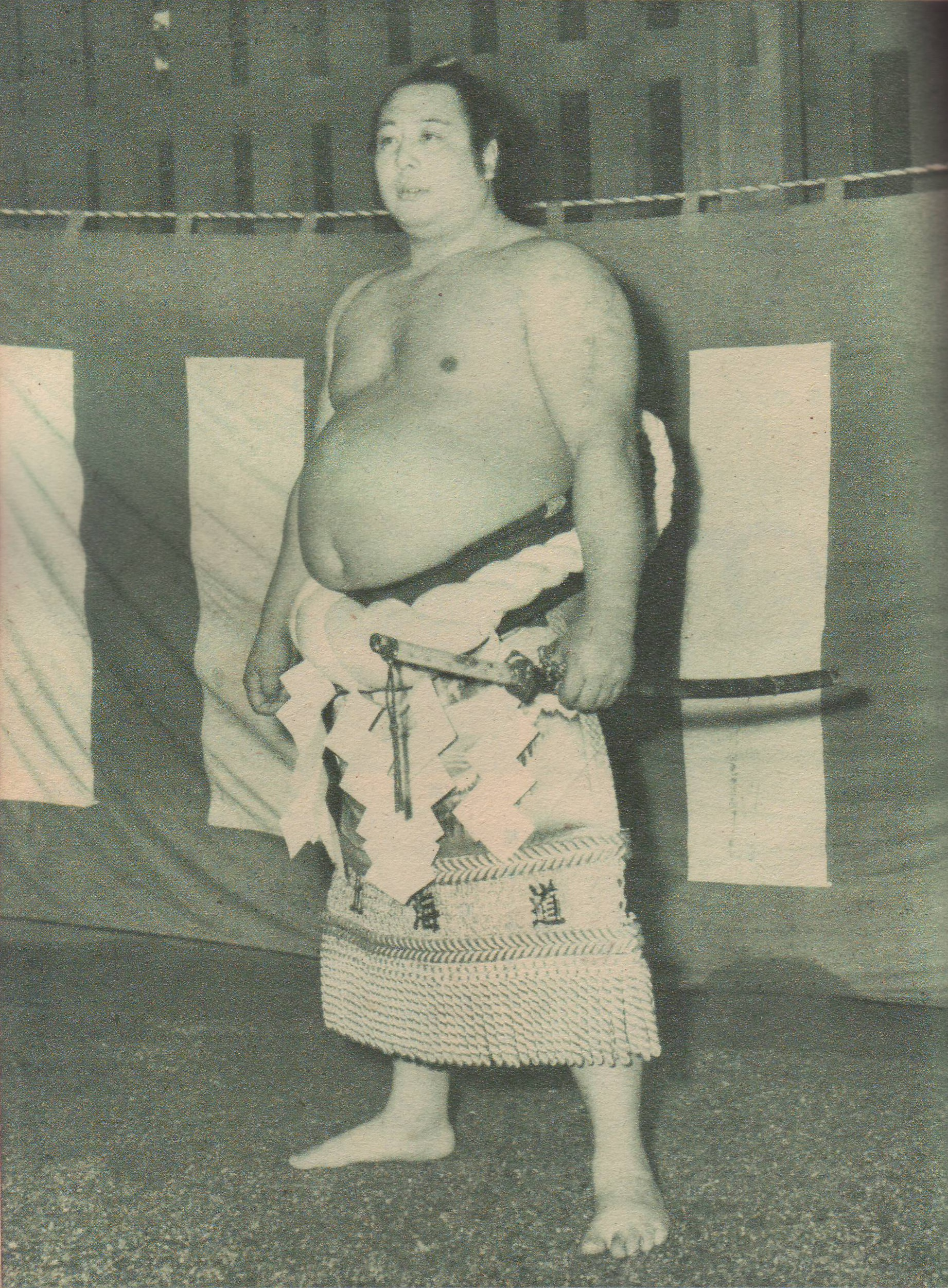
- Yoshibayama, circa 1954

Personal information
- Native name: 吉葉山 潤之輔
- Born: Ikeda Junnosuke; April 3, 1920 Hokkaidō, Japan
- Died: November 26, 1977 (aged 57)
- Height: 1.79 m (5 ft 10 1/2 in)
- Weight: 143 kg (315 lb)

Sport
- Sport: Sumo
- Retired: January, 1958
- Heya: Takashima -> Miyagino stable
- Record: 357-171-85-1hold
- Debut: May, 1938
- Highest rank: Yokozuna (January, 1954)
- Elder name: Miyagino
- Championships: 1 (Makuuchi); 1 (Makushita)
- Special Prizes: Outstanding Performance (3)
- Gold Stars: 2 (Terukuni)
- Updated on June 2020

Yoshibayama Junnosuke (Japanese: 吉葉山 潤之輔; April 3, 1920 – November 26, 1977), real name Ikeda Junnosuke (池田 潤之輔), was a Japanese professional sumo wrestler from Atsuta District, Hokkaido. He was the sport's 43rd yokozuna. He suffered a number of injuries and only won one tournament championship, but was a popular wrestler. He was a runner-up five times, and earned three special prizes and two gold stars in his top division career. After his retirement in 1958 he revived and led the Miyagino stable until his death in 1977.

== Career ==
He entered sumo in a curious way. He had travelled to Tokyo on a train to attend school, but was met at the station by a sumo wrestler who was expecting a new recruit, who had in fact had second thoughts and not made the trip. The conspicuously large Ikeda was mistaken for him and taken back to Takashima stable before he even realised what was going on. He made his professional debut in May 1938 using the shikona or ring name Hokutozan Junnosuke (北糖山 潤之輔). After suffering appendicitis he had to undergo emergency surgery and changed his ring surname to Yoshibayama in May 1939 in honour of the doctor (Shosaku Yoshiba) who had saved his life. He got to the verge of promotion to the jūryō division in 1942 but was then drafted into the Japanese army and took part in World War II. He was seriously wounded in gunfights during his service. He was shot in the leg twice, and the second bullet permanently lodged itself in his foot. He was actually reported as dead for some time. He came back alive, but was surprisingly thin when he returned to Japan. It is generally believed among sumo scholars that if he had not been conscripted and lost several years of his career, he could have become an even stronger and longer lasting wrestler than he was.

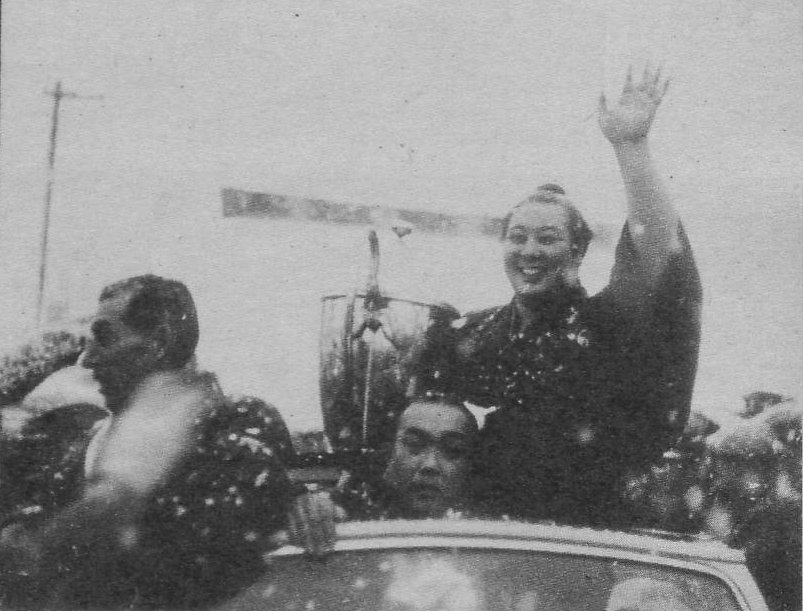
Yoshibayama waving during a parade celebrating his January 1954 tournament victory

In spite of his war injury, Yoshibayama returned to sumo in 1947 and was promoted to the top makuuchi division in November of that year. He remained in the maegashira ranks until September 1950. He was promoted to ōzeki in May 1951, after two successive runner-up performances of 13–2 at the rank of sekiwake. Yoshibayama recorded an azukari, or hold, on the 12th day of September 1951 tournament. The reason is that his opponent, Azumafuji, could not stand up any more. Yoshibayama could have been awarded a win, but sportingly insisted on a draw. In May 1953 he finished with 14 wins and only one loss, but the championship went to undefeated maegashira Tokitsuyama whom Yoshibayama had not been paired against.

Yoshibayama was promoted to yokozuna after winning his first championship with a perfect 15–0 record in January 1954, but did not win a single bout at the rank until the autumn tournament of that year. He was unable to win any championships in his yokozuna career and had only one runner-up result. Although he was popular with the public, he ate and drank to excess and had several internal ailments, including kidney problems. Having finally reached his physical limit, he announced his retirement during the January 1958 tournament. His old rival Kagamisato, who had been promoted to ōzeki alongside him in May 1951, also decided to retire on the final day, the first time that two yokozuna had quit in the same tournament.

== Fighting style ==
Because of the bullet in his ankle, Yoshibayama's style of fighting was erratic. It also did not help that his favourite technique was the controversial ketaguri, or leg kick, which was considered to be unacceptable at his top yokozuna rank. Scholars conceded however that Yoshibayama had had little time to master acceptable sumo techniques because of his time out of sumo due to the war.

== Retirement from sumo ==
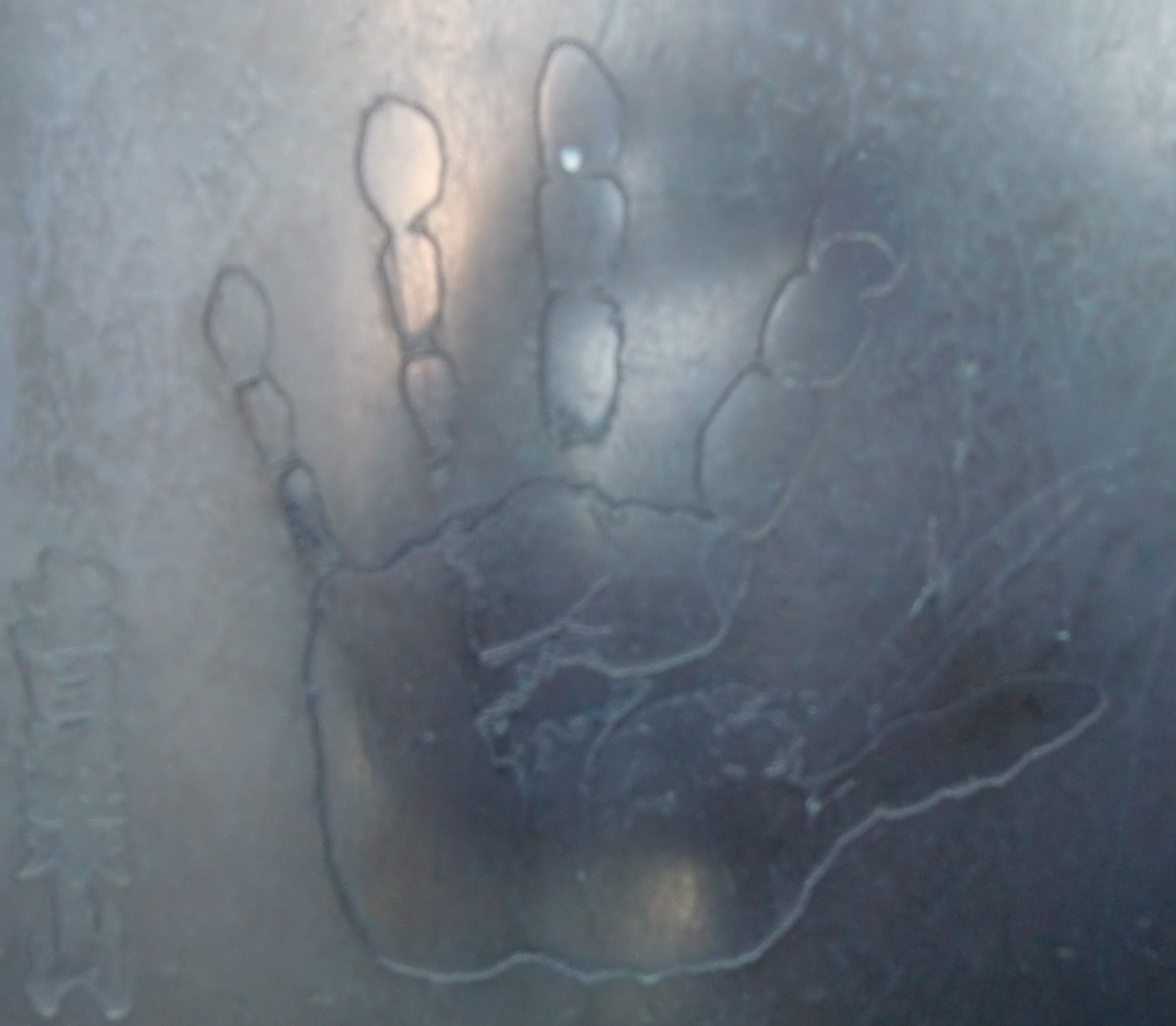
Yoshibayama's handprint displayed on a monument in Ryōgoku, Tokyo

After his retirement, Yoshibayama became the 8th head coach of Miyagino stable. The previous head coach was the 24th yokozuna Ōtori, but Miyagino stable was closed once after his death in 1956. While still an active wrestler, he managed his own stable, a practice no longer permitted. Ōtori's son-in-law Fukunosato Ushinosuke belonged to his stable. He officially renamed his stable to Miyagino stable in 1960. He developed a number of top division wrestlers, such as Myōbudani. He was also a judge of tournament bouts, and on the Japan Sumo Association's board of directors. He also opened a number of chankonabe restaurants that still operate today.

Future makuuchi wrestler Chikubayama also joined his stable, but could not reach the top makuuchi division by 1977 when Yoshibayama died. Chikubayama accepted future yokozuna Hakuhō when he was the Miyagino stablemaster. Yoshibayama performed the yokozuna dohyō-iri (ring entering ceremony) in the shiranui style. When Hakuhō was promoted to yokozuna, he succeeded Yoshibayama's style. At the Meiji Jingu shrine on June 1, 2007, Hakuhō performed the ring entering ceremony wearing Yoshibayama's keshō-mawashi and used a sword (tachi) of another yokozuna, Ōtori.

== Pre-modern career record ==
- Through most of the 1940s only two tournaments were held a year. In 1953 the New Year tournament was begun and the Spring tournament began to be held in Osaka. The Kyushu tournament was first held in 1957, and the Nagoya tournament in 1958.

Yoshibayama Junnosuke
-	Spring Haru basho, Tokyo	Summer Natsu basho, Tokyo	Autumn Aki basho, Tokyo
1938	x	(Maezumo)	Not held
1939	East Jonokuchi #11; 2–5	West Jonidan #68; 6–2	Not held
1940	West Jonidan #12; 7–1	East Sandanme #29; 7–1	Not held
1941	East Makushita #28; 7–1	West Makushita #5; 3–5	Not held
1942	East Makushita #10; 5–3	East Makushita #1; 7–1; Champion	Not held
1943	Out of sumo	Out of sumo	Not held
1944	Out of sumo	Out of sumo	Out of sumo
1945	Not held	Out of sumo	Out of sumo
1946	Not held	Not held	Out of sumo
1947	Not held	East Jūryō #4; 9–1–P	East Maegashira #13; 8–3
1948	Not held	East Maegashira #7; 8–3	East Maegashira #2; 5–6 ★
1949	East Maegashira #3; 7–6	East Maegashira #3; 2–13	East Maegashira #10; 10–5
1950	East Maegashira #3; 10–5; O★	East Maegashira #1; 10–5; O	East Sekiwake #2; 13–2; O
1951	East Sekiwake #1; 13–2	West Ōzeki #1; 10–5	East Ōzeki #1; 9–5–1hold
1952	West Ōzeki #1; 12–3	East Ōzeki #1; 10–5	West Ōzeki #1; 12–3
Record given as wins–losses–absences Top division champion Top division runner-up Retired Lower divisions Non-participation Sanshō key: F=Fighting spirit; O=Outstanding performance; T=Technique Also shown: ★=Kinboshi; P=Playoff(s); Divisions: Makuuchi — Jūryō — Makushita — Sandanme — Jonidan — Jonokuchi Makuuchi ranks: Yokozuna — Ōzeki — Sekiwake — Komusubi — Maegashira

-	New Year Hatsu basho, Tokyo	Spring Haru basho, Osaka	Summer Natsu basho, Tokyo	Autumn Aki basho, Tokyo
1953	West Ōzeki #1; 6–3–6	West Ōzeki #1; 10–5	West Ōzeki #1; 14–1	East Ōzeki #1; 11–4
1954	East Ōzeki #1; 15–0	West Yokozuna #1; Sat out due to injury 0–0–15	West Yokozuna #2; 0–1–14	West Yokozuna #2; 11–4
1955	West Yokozuna #2; 5–2–8	East Yokozuna #3; 3–2–10	West Yokozuna #2; 0–2–13	West Yokozuna #2; 9–6
1956	East Yokozuna #2; 9–6	West Yokozuna #1; 11–4	East Yokozuna #1; 8–7	East Yokozuna #2; 12–3
Record given as wins–losses–absences Top division champion Top division runner-up Retired Lower divisions Non-participation Sanshō key: F=Fighting spirit; O=Outstanding performance; T=Technique Also shown: ★=Kinboshi; P=Playoff(s); Divisions: Makuuchi — Jūryō — Makushita — Sandanme — Jonidan — Jonokuchi Makuuchi ranks: Yokozuna — Ōzeki — Sekiwake — Komusubi — Maegashira

== Modern top division record ==
- Since the addition of the Kyushu tournament in 1957 and the Nagoya tournament in 1958, the yearly schedule has remained unchanged.

Year	January Hatsu basho, Tokyo	March Haru basho, Osaka	May Natsu basho, Tokyo	July Nagoya basho, Nagoya	September Aki basho, Tokyo	November Kyūshū basho, Fukuoka
1957	West Yokozuna #1; 10–5	East Yokozuna #2; 3–3–9	West Yokozuna #2; 5–6–4	Not held	East Yokozuna #2; 9–6	West Yokozuna #1; 11–4
1958	West Yokozuna #1; Retired; 3–6	x	x	x	x	x
Record given as wins–losses–absences Top division champion Top division runner-up Retired Lower divisions Non-participation Sanshō key: F=Fighting spirit; O=Outstanding performance; T=Technique Also shown: ★=Kinboshi; P=Playoff(s); Divisions: Makuuchi — Jūryō — Makushita — Sandanme — Jonidan — Jonokuchi Makuuchi ranks: Yokozuna — Ōzeki — Sekiwake — Komusubi — Maegashira

== See also ==
- Glossary of sumo terms
- List of past sumo wrestlers
- List of sumo tournament top division champions
- List of yokozuna

Preceded by Kagamisato Kiyoji	43rd Yokozuna; 1954–1958	Succeeded by Tochinishiki Kiyotaka
Yokozuna is not a successive rank, and more than one wrestler can hold the title at once
