= Miyagino stable =

Defunct sumo stable

Coordinates: 35.6941°N 139.8064°E

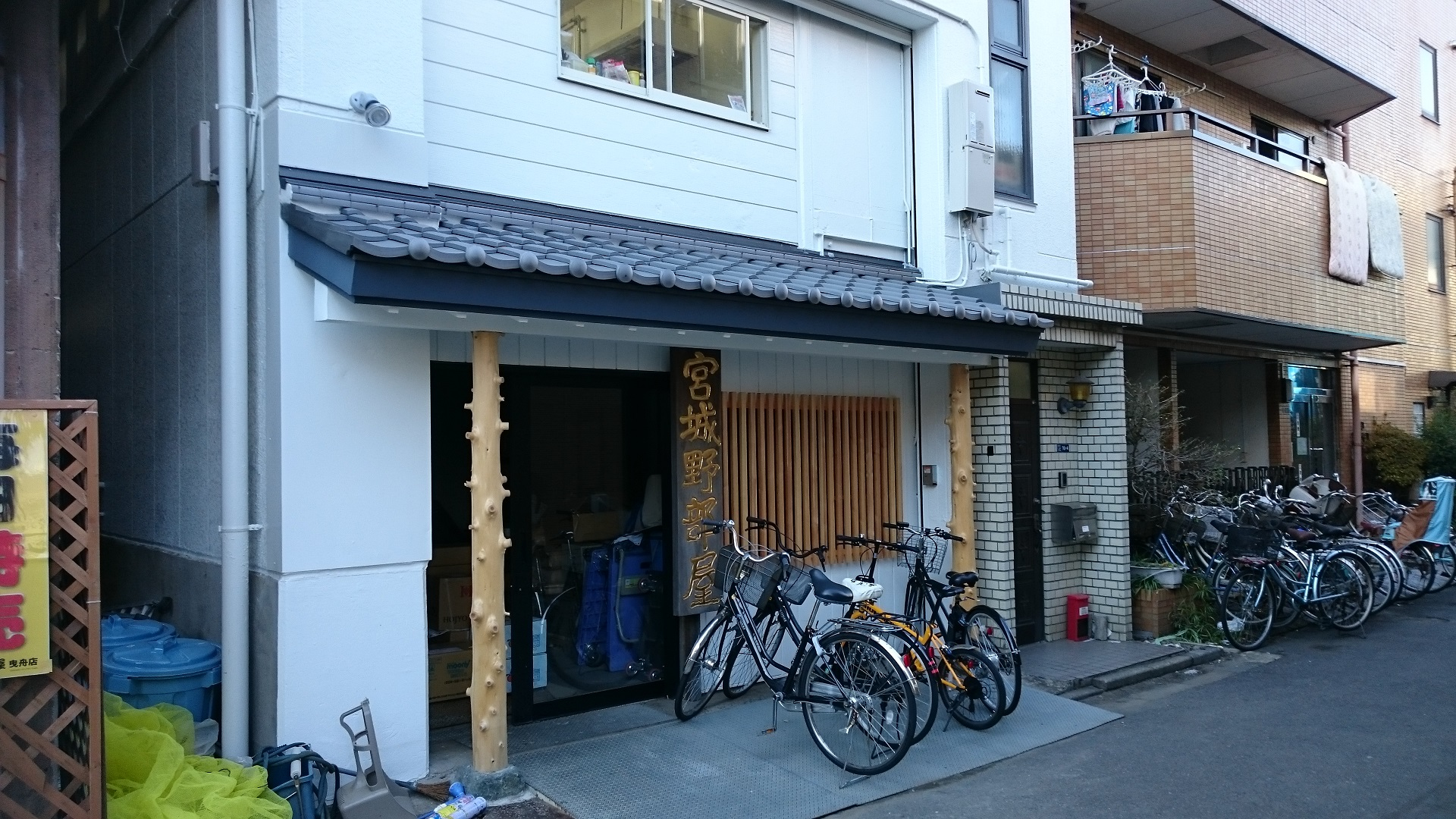
Former building of the stable on Yahiro district

Miyagino stable (宮城野部屋, Miyagino-beya) (1960–2024) was a sumo stable of the Isegahama group.

It was founded by the 43rd yokozuna Yoshibayama as Yoshibayama dōjō while he was still an active wrestler, before changing to its current name in 1960. As of January 2023, the stable had 20 wrestlers, with two of them ranked in the second highest professional division.

In March 2024, the Sumo Association closed Miyagino stable in the aftermath of physical abuse by former Miyagino wrestler Hokuseihō and the subsequent punishment of its stablemaster, the 69th yokozuna Hakuhō. Wrestlers and coaches in the stable were transferred to Isegahama stable. Initially closed until further notice, the stable saw its last master resign from the Japan Sumo Association in June 2025, leaving the stable's staff under the responsibility of Isegahama stable.

== History ==
In August 2004 former jūryō division wrestler Kanechika took over in controversial circumstances from former maegashira Chikubayama, who had been in charge since 1989. Unusually, the new stablemaster was from a different ichimon (Kanechika belonged to Kitanoumi stable, part of the Dewanoumi ichimon, in his days as an active wrestler). Kanechika was able to take control of the stable because he married one of the daughters of the 9th Miyagino's widow, who owned the toshiyori name, which Chikubayama was only borrowing, and was adopted by her as her son. Chikubayama, who had guided future yokozuna Hakuhō to the top division, was able to stay on as a coach in the stable by acquiring the Kumagatani name. However, in December 2010 he regained control of the Miyagino name and stable after Kanechika was disciplined by the Sumo Association for being caught on tape discussing match-fixing.

Miyagino stable missed two tournaments in 2021 due to outbreaks of COVID-19. The stable withdrew from the January tournament following Hakuhō's positive test and from the September tournament after positive tests from Hokuseihō and another lower-division wrestler.

In July 2022 the Sumo Association announced that Magaki (Hakuhō) and Miyagino (maegashira Chikubayama) would be exchanging elder-stocks, with Hakuhō becoming the 13th Miyagino and officially becoming the main coach at the stable. In August of the same year, Miyagino stable also changed location for the second time in the past seven years and started to use the building of the former Azumazeki stable.

=== Recruitments ===
The stable has strong links to Tottori Jōhoku High School's sumo program, with Hakuōhō, Hokuseihō and Ishiura all being graduates. Ishiura's father is the coach of the high school team.

Under the recommendation of Hakuhō, the stable began to scout promising talents. In 2020, when Hakuhō was not yet the stablemaster, the stable recruited Hokuseihō, a 2-meter-tall Mongolian wrestler. As he was raised in Hokkaido from the age of five, Miyagino was allowed to circumvent the Sumo Association's "one foreigner per stable" rule. Hokuseihō won consecutive championships in the second half of 2020 with perfect records in the jonokuchi, jonidan and sandanme divisions. In July 2021, he won the makushita championship and was promoted to jūryō. He reached the top makuuchi division in March 2023, reaching the rank of maegashira 6 later that year.

In July 2022, Hakuhō recruited 23 year-old Kawazoe Keita, a college yokozuna, into Miyagino-beya. Given Kawazoe's university title, he would enter at the rank of makushita 15 as his accomplishments allows him to use the makushita tsukedashi system. On December 1, it was announced that the stable recruited Ochiai Tetsuya, a two time High School Yokozuna. Similarly to Kawazoe, his high school accomplishments allows him to use the makushita tsukedashi system and enter at the rank of makushita 15. After a strong performance in his first professional tournament, Ochiai managed to win the makushita tournament with a perfect score, securing a promotion to jūryō, a first for a makushita tsukedashi. Following his achievement, Ochiai became the fourth sekitori in Miyagino stable and the first wrestler to achieve this rank since Hakuhō took charge of the stable. Ochiai received the shikona (ring name) of Hakuōhō prior to his top division debut.

In February 2024, the stable recruited Matsui Kanato, a Jōhoku High graduate who qualified among the top 8 national corporate wrestlers, becoming the first wrestler to qualify for tsukedachi status to be recruited by the Sumo Association since the new system was installed in September 2023. This recruitment makes Matsui the first tsukedachi in 24 years to be able to start his career at the lowest makushita rank, having to start at makushita tsukedachi 60.

=== Hokuseihō assault allegations ===
Following the January 2024 tournament the Sumo Association opened an investigation into Hokuseihō on allegations that he assaulted other wrestlers in his stable. The Sumo Association's Compliance Committee later found the allegations to be true. Hokuseihō submitted his retirement notification on 22 February 2024, the day before the full Sumo Association board was expected to take up the committee's recommendations, which included the retirement of Hokuseihō and the demotion of Miyagino by two positions in sumo's hierarchy.

On 23 February 2024 the Sumo Association met and accepted the resignation of Hokuseihō. Hakuhō was demoted from iin (committee member) to the lowest ranking of toshiyori (elder) and received a salary cut of 20 percent for three months. Additionally, the Sumo Association took actions that effectively removed Hakuhō as stablemaster for the time being, announcing that a member of the Isegahama ichimon would be appointed temporary stablemaster of Miyagino stable for the March 2024 tournament. Thereafter, the same group would oversee training of wrestlers in the stable for an unspecified period of time. Following the release of the March 2024 banzuke it was announced that Tamagaki (komusubi Tomonohana), a coach at Ōshima stable, would be appointed acting master.

=== Stable closure ===
At a meeting of elders prior to the March 2024 tournament in Osaka, Hakuhō apologized for the trouble that had been caused. The Isegahama ichimon then met to discuss several options for the stable. The options reportedly included having another coach in the stable take over as master, as well as the closure of the stable and the transfer of wrestlers and personnel to other stables in the Isegahama group. On the first day of the March tournament the Isegahama ichimon submitted a proposal to the Sumo Association to close Miyagino stable from April 2024 and possibly revive it again in the future. Some news reports from the pre-tournament meetings suggested that members of the stable had already proceeded on the assumption that the stable would close. In mid-March, plans surfaced to transfer Miyagino staff to one or more of the Isegahama ichimon stables. It soon became apparent that the preferred solution would be to transfer all staff to a single stable, with plans to transfer to the Ōshima and Asakayama stables each being rejected (respectively by the association and by Asakayama himself).

Public broadcaster NHK reported after the March tournament that a proposal had been put forward to move Miyagino personnel to Isegahama stable, led by the 63rd yokozuna Asahifuji. On 28 March 2024 the Sumo Association formally announced the closure of Miyagino stable for the foreseeable future and the transfer of wrestlers and coaches to Isegahama stable. The signboard outside of Miyagino stable was removed on 3 April, and personnel completed the move to Isegahama stable on 7 April. Training of Miyagino wrestlers with the Isegahama wrestlers commenced the following day, with Asahifuji commenting that he hoped Hakuhō could teach the combined group of about 40 wrestlers his skills as a yokozuna.

On the subject of the stable's closure, Ishinriki confided to Tokyo Sports that the merger between the two stables would be hampered by a number of obstacles, citing in particular the difference in character and past tensions between Terunofuji and Hakuhō that could complicate cohabitation but also the fact that the Miyagino stable included wrestlers who were generally lower-ranked, and who would therefore have to keep a low profile in their new positions, as was the case for Fujishima stable when it merged with Futagoyama stable in 1993. Still according to Ishinriki, the merger situation could well last until Isegahama's definitive retirement in July 2025.

Following the May 2024 tournament it was announced that four lower-division wrestlers that began their professional careers with Miyagino stable (and were subsequently transferred to Isegahama) had all decided to retire. According to reports at the time, a number of Miyagino wrestlers considered themselves proud to be affiliated with the Miyagino name, and strongly felt that they could not accept a transfer to another stable.

On 29 May 2025, the Sumo Association declared at an ordinary meeting of its board of directors that the question of allowing Miyagino to be released from his punishment would be discussed at an extraordinary meeting, the date of which was set on 2 June to coincide with the definitive retirement of Isegahama (the former yokozuna Asahifuji). At the same time, however, the press echoed Miyagino's willingness to resign his position with the association altogether, citing in particular his unwillingness to continue teaching in the Isegahama stable after the former Asahifuji's retirement, should it be taken over by Terunofuji, but also the fact that no clear timeframe or reasons had been given for re-establishing Miyagino stable's opening. On June 2, it was confirmed in a Sumo Association press release that Miyagino would indeed be retiring, effectively closing the stable and maintaining custody of staff from Miyagino stable to Isegahama stable.

At the retirement press conference for Hakuhō on 9 June 2025, Asahifuji (who took over Hakuhō's elder stock and became Miyagino) told reporters that if there was a former Miyagino wrestler who could next take on the Miyagino name, he would do his best to help him revive Miyagino stable. In May 2026, the Japan Sumo Association announced the permanent closure of the stable, citing the fact that more than two years had passed since the Miyagino staff had been placed under the supervision of Isegahama stable, that one year had passed since the departure of former yokozuna Hakuhō, and that no request to reopen Miyagino stable had been submitted to the board as of that date. Consequently, the decision considered the members of the former Miyagino stable to be fully part of the Isegahama stable and not under temporary tutelage anymore.

== Ring name conventions ==
Many wrestlers at this stable take ring names or shikona that contains the character 鵬 (read: hō), meaning "peng", in honor of the 69th yokozuna and latest stablemaster Hakuhō Shō.

== Owners ==
- 2022–2024: 13th Miyagino: Hakuhō (toshiyori, 69th yokozuna)
- 2010–2022: 12th Miyagino: Chikubayama (maegashira 13)
- 2004–2010: 11th Miyagino: Kanechika (jūryō)
- 1989–2004: 10th Miyagino: Chikubayama (maegashira 13)
- 1977–1989: 9th Miyagino: Hirokawa (komusubi)
- 1960–1977: 8th Miyagino: Yoshibayama (43rd yokozuna)

== Notable former members ==
- Hakuhō (69th yokozuna)
- Myōbudani (sekiwake)
- Mutsuarashi (sekiwake)
- Hirokawa (komusubi)
- Kōryū (maegashira)
- Wakayoshiba (maegashira)
- Chikubayama (maegashira)
- Daishin (maegashira)
- Kōbō (maegashira)
- Arashiyama (maegashira)
- Ryūō (maegashira)
- Daikihō (maegashira)
- Ishiura (maegashira)
- Hokuseihō (maegashira)
- Hakuōhō (maegashira)
- Enhō (maegashira)
- Kihō (jūryō)
- Tenshōhō (jūryō)

== Coaches ==
- Magaki Yoshito (toshiyori, maegashira Ishiura Shikanosuke)

== Referee ==
- Shikimori Seisuke (Sandanme gyōji, real name Koshi Saikawa)

== Usher ==
- Ryūji (makuuchi yobidashi, real name Ryūji Takahashi)

== Hairdresser ==
- Tokoshun (5th class tokoyama)

== Location and access ==
- 2022-current: Tokyo, Sumida Ward, Higashi Komagata 4–6–4
- until 2022: Tokyo, Sumida Ward, Yahiro 2–16–10, 10 minute walk from Hikifune Station on Keisei Oshiage Line

== See also ==
- List of sumo stables
- List of sumo elders
- List of active sumo wrestlers
- List of past sumo wrestlers
- List of years in sumo
- Glossary of sumo terms
