= Ishiura Shikanosuke =

Japanese sumo wrestler

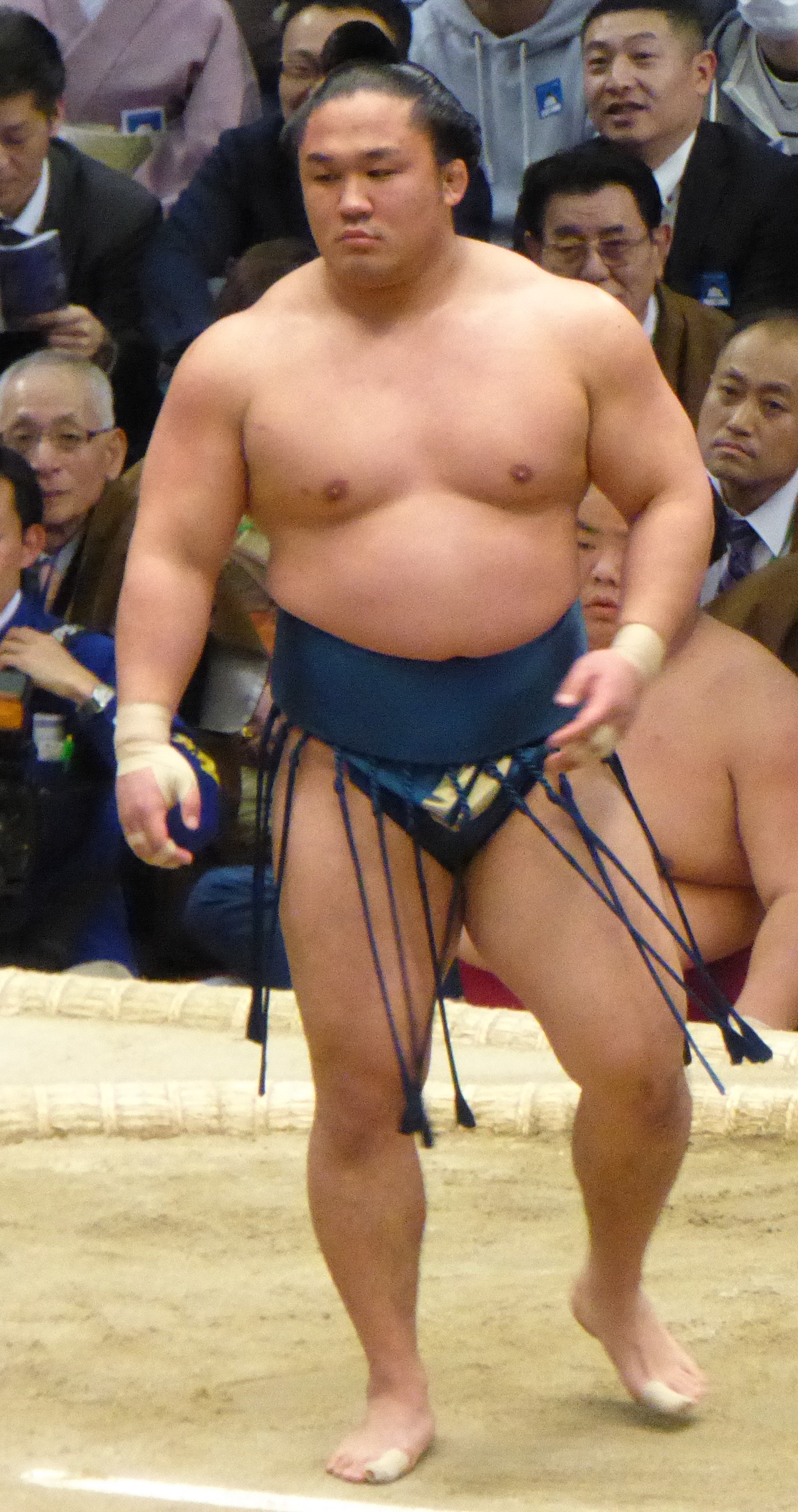
- Ishiura in 2017

Personal information
- Native name: 石浦 鹿介
- Born: Masakatsu Ishiura; January 10, 1990 (age 36) Tottori Prefecture, Japan
- Height: 1.75 m (5 ft 9 in)
- Weight: 121 kg (267 lb)

Sport
- Sport: Sumo
- University team: Nihon University
- Retired: 1 June 2023
- Heya: Miyagino
- Record: 350-321-108
- Debut: January, 2013
- Highest rank: Maegashira 5 (March, 2022)
- Elder name: Magaki
- Championships: 1 (Jonidan); 1 (Jonokuchi)
- Special Prizes: Fighting Spirit (1)
- Updated on 1 June 2023

Ishiura Shikanosuke (Japanese: 石浦 鹿介; born January 10, 1990 as Masakatsu Ishiura (石浦 将勝, Ishiura Masakatsu)) is a retired Japanese professional sumo wrestler from Tottori Prefecture. Wrestling for Miyagino stable, he debuted in sumo wrestling in January 2013 and made his makuuchi debut in November 2016. His highest rank was maegashira 5, and he has one special prize for Fighting Spirit. He retired from sumo on 1 June 2023.

== Background ==
Ishiura was born in Tottori, the principal city of Tottori Prefecture, and attended Tottori Jōhoku High School, where he was a member of the sumo club. Following high school, he studied at Nihon University. He nearly gave up sumo and moved to Australia to study at an English language college in 2012. While there he won the Australian Open and Lightweight Sumo titles and while staying in Sydney was cast as an adversary for Wolverine in a new movie, but he withdrew from the role and decided to return to Japan and try professional sumo after being inspired by the success of some of his friends from his amateur days. At 23 he was at the upper end of the age limit to enter professional sumo and knew this was his last chance.

Ishiura is of unusually small stature for a sumo wrestler: when he made his makuuchi debut at 116 kg (256 lb) he was officially 18 kg (40 lb) lighter than any other competitor in the division, although he outweighs Terutsuyoshi and his stablemate Enho who have made the top division subsequently.)

He has also been known for his contributions on social media, posting video clips on Twitter of his fellow wrestlers playing arcade games and competing in sprint races.

He is sponsored by McLaren Automotive, and on his 27th birthday he arrived at the Ryōgoku Kokugikan in a sports car that they provided for him.

== Career ==
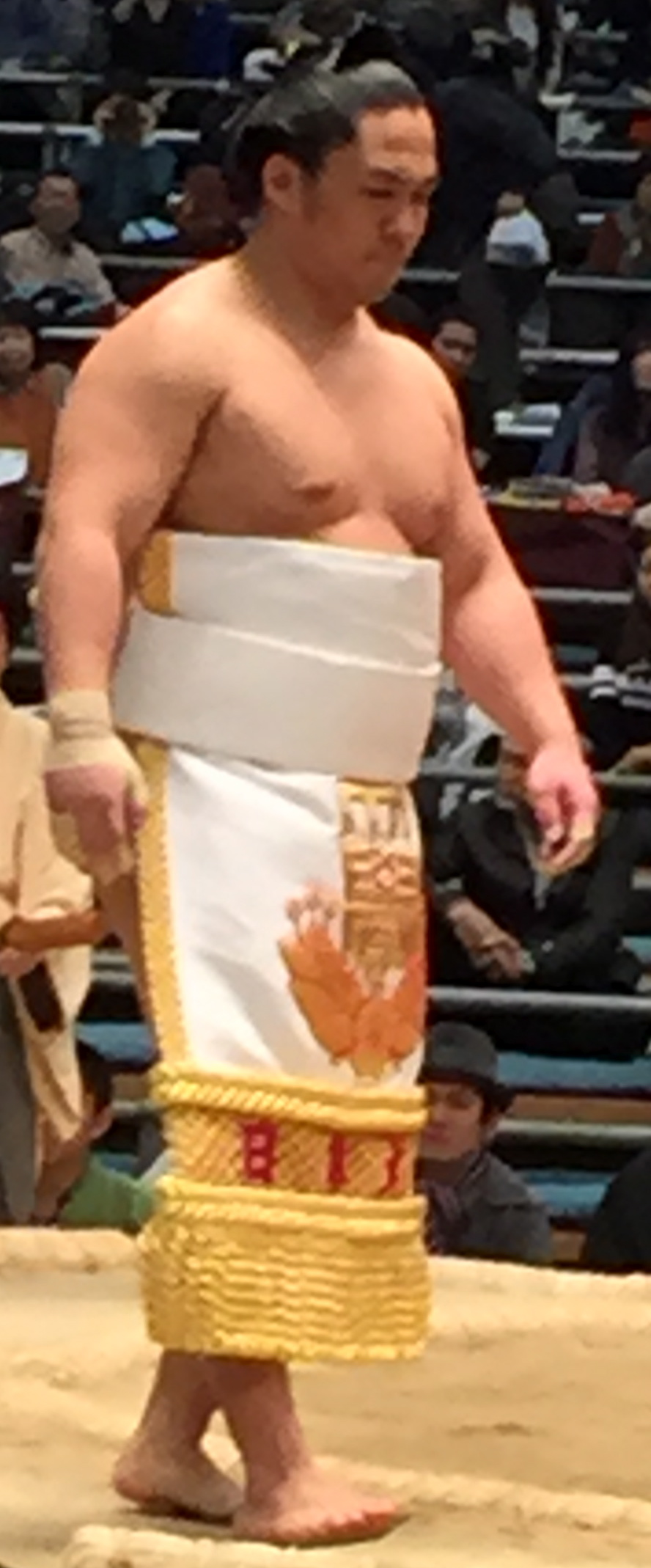
Ishiura in 2015

Ishiura joined the Miyagino stable and entered professional sumo in 2013 at the relatively advanced age of 23. He made an immediate impact, winning the jonokuchi division in March and the jonidan division in May with unblemished 7-0 records and earning a third straight promotion with six wins at sandanme in July. As he worked his way up the ranks he served as a tsukebito or personal attendant to yokozuna Hakuhō. He spent the next nine tournaments in the third makushita division before earning another promotion with a 6–1 record in January 2015. He was the first new sekitori from Tottori Prefecture since Kotozakura 52 years earlier. In the second division (jūryō) he proved himself a consistent performer, recording seven winning records (kachi-koshi) in ten tournaments and clinching yet another promotion with nine wins in September 2016.

Ishiura made his makuuchi debut in November, 2016 debuting at East Maegashira 15. After losing on the first day of the tournament to Chiyotairyu Ishiura won the next ten days straight putting him on the leader board for a while. However, on day 12 Ishiura suffered his second loss to Ikioi and then continued to lose for the rest of the tournament finishing off with a 10–5 record which was enough to win him his first special prize, for Fighting Spirit. In his debut tournament he was able to get ten straight victories, double digit wins, and his first special prize. His ten wins equaled the performance of Shōdai in January 2016 and was otherwise the best by a top-division debutante since Ichinojo's thirteen wins in September 2014. In the January 2017 tournament, at Maegashira 9, he was only able to secure a 6–9 record. The March 2017 tournament saw him at maegashira 11, and he had mixed results. On the final day his record was 7–7, however he was unable to get the win against Takarafuji and end the tournament with a losing record of 7–8. He won only three bouts at maegashira 10 in the September 2017 tournament and was demoted back to the jūryō division, but an 8–7 record at the rank of West Jūryō 1 in November 2017 was sufficient to return him to makuuchi.

Ishiura remained in the top division for the next five tournaments, but after four straight losing records was demoted to jūryō again after the September 2018 tournament. After a two tournament stint in jūryō he returned to the top division in March 2019. He dropped to jūryō in July, but is ranked in makuuchi for September 2019. This was the first tournament that he and his stablemates Hakuhō and Enhō were all fit and in makuuchi together, allowing them all to take part in the yokozuna dohyo-iri ceremony.

In training at his stable before the January 2020 tournament he came to blows with a junior ranked wrestler, Hokahō, after a series of heated bouts and the pair had to be separated by Hakuhō. The incident was reported to the Sumo Association by Miyagino Oyakata, and Ishiura was docked 20 percent of one month's salary. He missed the start of the September 2020 tournament due to a right ankle injury suffered on Day 14 of the July tournament, but returned from Day 8. He was forced to sit out the January 2021 tournament after his stablemate Hakuhō tested positive for COVID-19, and sat out in September 2021 because of another COVID-19 outbreak.

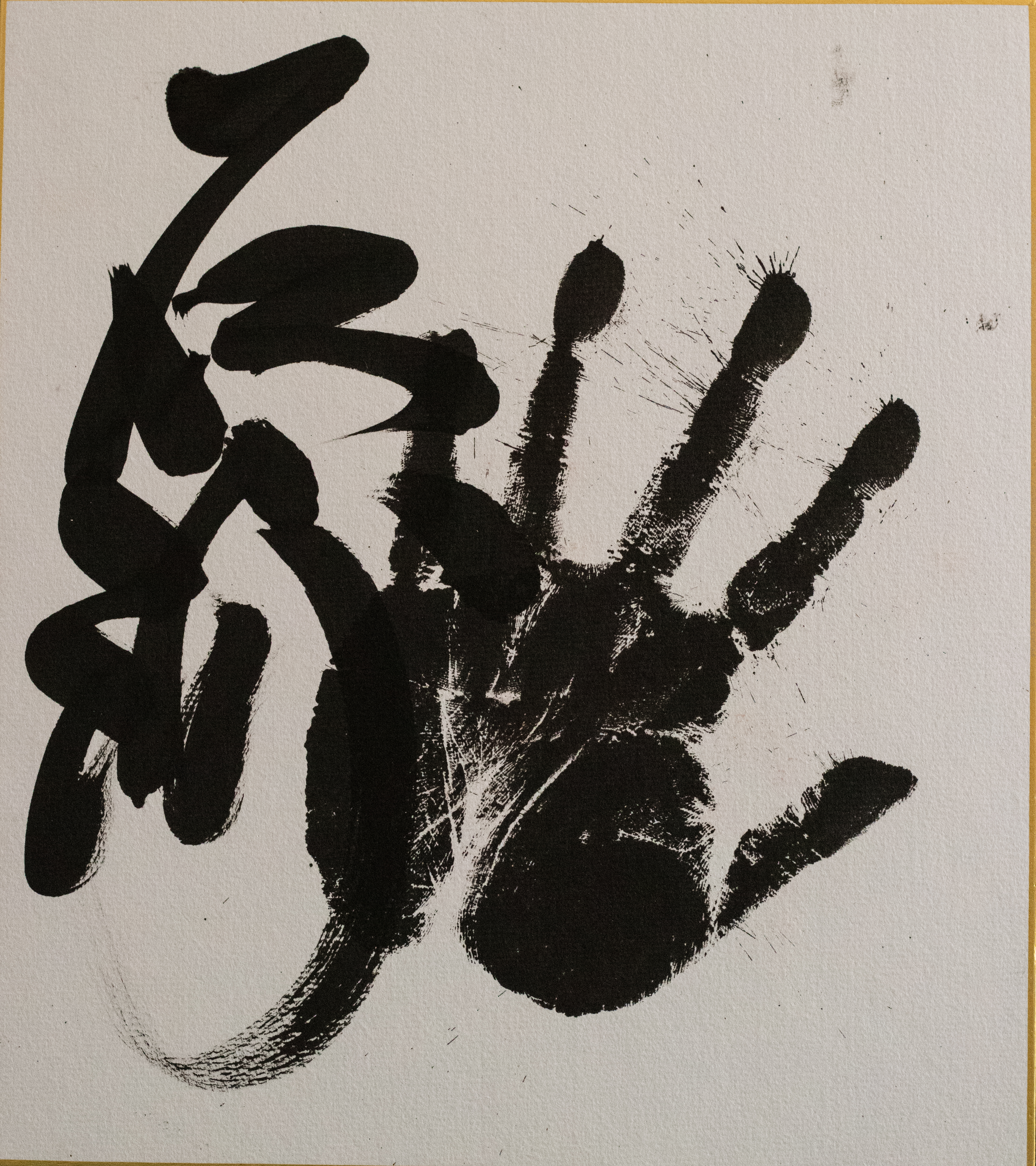
Ishiura original tegata (handprint and signature)

Ishiura pulled out of the March 2022 tournament after he suffered a pinched nerve in his Day 3 bout with Kotonowaka, but returned on Day 11. He withdrew again at the start of the May 2022 basho due to cervical spine injuries which would require about three weeks of treatment. The same injury forced him to withdraw from the following tournament in July after being demoted to jūryō. During this absence Ishiura lost around 25 kg (55 lb). On June 1, 2023, Ishiura finally announced his retirement after a year without competing. At his retirement conference, Ishiura explained his surgeon told him he would not be able to wrestle anymore if he underwent surgery. However he was also told there was a risk that he would become paralysed if he continued to wrestle without surgery. In order to be able to spend more time with his children, Ishiura decided to retire, a decision he had been considering since the summer of 2022. Ishiura decided to remain in the Japan Sumo Association as an elder under the name Magaki, succeeding former maegashira Chikubayama who agreed to give him the name Magaki despite the fact that he had 3 years of employment left as a san'yo (consultant). In September, Ishiura took part in an elder presentation conference at the Ryōgoku Kokugikan and announced that he was training to be able to wrestle as a trainer in Miyagino stable's training ring despite his injury.

Ishiura's retirement ceremony was held on 1 June 2024 at the Ryōgoku Kokugikan, with about 300 people taking part in the cutting of his topknot. Miyagino (the 69th yokozuna Hakuhō), who recruited Ishiura into the sumo world, made the second-to-last cut. The final cut was made by Isegahama (the 63rd yokozuna Asahifuji), head of the stable where Ishiura and others from Miyagino stable were transferred following the latter's temporary closure earlier in the year. A few weeks before the ceremony, Ishiura announced that his retirement program would include a sumo tournament between lower-division wrestlers of Isegahama stable and the sumo club at his alma mater Tottori Jōhoku High School.

== Fighting style ==
Ishiura favoured a right hand inside, left hand outside grip on his opponent's mawashi or belt. His favourite kimarite or winning technique is shitatenage, the underarm throw. In November 2019, Ishiura won a victory in the Fukuoka Tournament ('Basho') over Nishikigi on Day Eight using what is likely the rarest winning technique in sumo: the mitokorozeme (三所攻め) or 'three places attack' is a kimarite that had not been seen in the top division since Mainoumi used it in 1993.

== Personal life ==
Ishiura announced in May 2017 that he had married a nursery school teacher in April after a four-year relationship. The wedding ceremony was held in October 2017 with his stablemate Hakuhō among the 500 guests. The couple have three children (two boys and a girl), the first of whom was born in May 2018.

== Career record ==
Ishiura Shikanosuke
Year	January Hatsu basho, Tokyo	March Haru basho, Osaka	May Natsu basho, Tokyo	July Nagoya basho, Nagoya	September Aki basho, Tokyo	November Kyūshū basho, Fukuoka
2013	(Maezumo)	West Jonokuchi #6; 7–0; Champion	West Jonidan #8; 7–0; Champion	West Sandanme #17; 6–1	East Makushita #41; 5–2	West Makushita #25; 6–1
2014	West Makushita #11; 5–2	East Makushita #5; 4–3	West Makushita #2; 2–5	East Makushita #11; 5–2	West Makushita #6; 3–4	East Makushita #10; 4–3
2015	West Makushita #6; 6–1	East Jūryō #14; 9–6	East Jūryō #11; 8–7	East Jūryō #9; 6–9	East Jūryō #12; 8–7	East Jūryō #10; 7–8
2016	East Jūryō #10; 8–7	West Jūryō #8; 8–7	East Jūryō #6; 8–7	East Jūryō #5; 7–8	East Jūryō #6; 9–6	East Maegashira #15; 10–5; F
2017	West Maegashira #9; 6–9	West Maegashira #11; 7–8	West Maegashira #11; 8–7	West Maegashira #8; 7–8	East Maegashira #10; 3–12	West Jūryō #1; 8–7
2018	East Maegashira #15; 9–6	East Maegashira #12; 7–8	East Maegashira #13; 6–9	East Maegashira #15; 7–8	West Maegashira #16; 4–11	East Jūryō #5; 8–7
2019	West Jūryō #3; 9–6	East Maegashira #15; 6–9	West Maegashira #16; 5–10	East Jūryō #2; 9–6	East Maegashira #15; 8–7	East Maegashira #11; 9–6
2020	West Maegashira #10; 6–9	East Maegashira #12; 9–6	East Maegashira #8; Tournament Cancelled; State of Emergency; 0–0–0	East Maegashira #8; 4–11	West Maegashira #13; 4–4–7	East Jūryō #3; 8–7
2021	East Jūryō #1; Sat out due to COVID rules 0–0–15	East Jūryō #2; 9–6	East Maegashira #16; 7–8	West Maegashira #16; 9–6	East Maegashira #12; Sat out due to COVID rules 0–0–15	East Maegashira #12; 7–8
2022	East Maegashira #12; 11–4	West Maegashira #5; 2–7–6	East Maegashira #16; Sat out due to injury 0–0–15	West Jūryō #10; Sat out due to injury 0–0–15	East Makushita #10; Sat out due to injury 0–0–7	West Makushita #50; Sat out due to injury 0–0–7
2023	West Sandanme #30; Sat out due to injury 0–0–7	West Sandanme #90; Sat out due to injury 0–0–7	West Jonidan #60; Sat out due to injury 0–0–7	West Jonokuchi #15; Retired –	x	x
Record given as wins–losses–absences Top division champion Top division runner-up Retired Lower divisions Non-participation Sanshō key: F=Fighting spirit; O=Outstanding performance; T=Technique Also shown: ★=Kinboshi; P=Playoff(s); Divisions: Makuuchi — Jūryō — Makushita — Sandanme — Jonidan — Jonokuchi Makuuchi ranks: Yokozuna — Ōzeki — Sekiwake — Komusubi — Maegashira

== See also ==
- Glossary of sumo terms
- List of past sumo wrestlers
- List of sumo elders
