= Hokuseihō Osamu =

Mongolian sumo wrestler (born 2001)

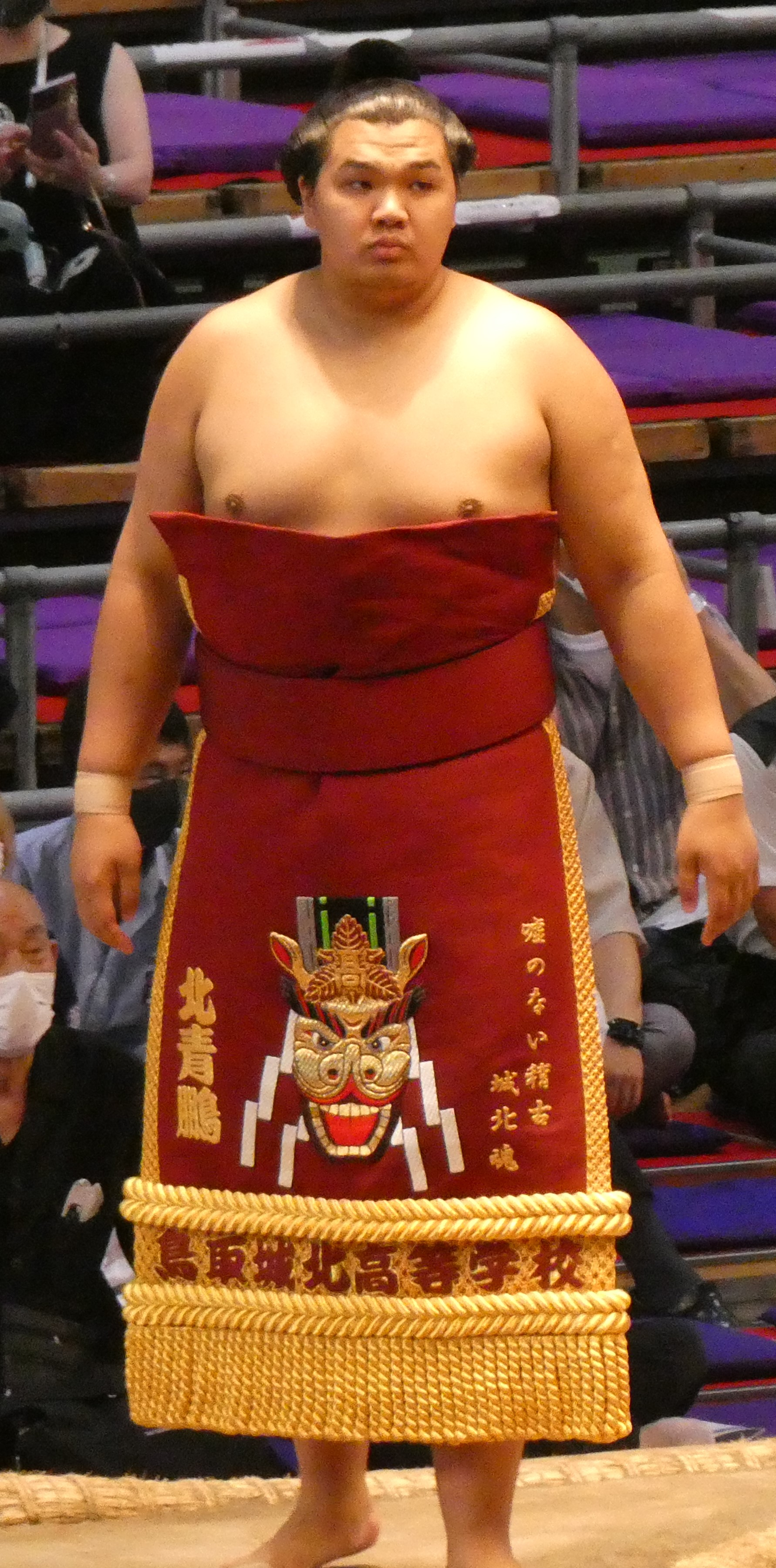
- Hokuseihō in 2022

Personal information
- Native name: 北青鵬 治
- Born: Ariunaa Davaaninj; 12 November 2001 (age 24) Ulaanbaatar, Mongolia
- Height: 204 cm (6 ft 8 in)
- Weight: 182 kg (401 lb; 29 st)

Sport
- Sport: Sumo
- Retired: February 2024
- Heya: Miyagino
- Record: 134-72-44
- Debut: March 2020
- Highest rank: Maegashira 6 (July 2023)
- Championships: 1 (Makushita); 1 (Sandanme); 1 (Jonidan); 1 (Jonokuchi)
- Updated on 22 February 2024

Hokuseihō Osamu (Japanese: 北青鵬 治; born 12 November 2001 as Ariunaagiin Davaaninj (Mongolian: Ариунаагийн Даваанинж)) is a Mongolian-born Japanese retired sumo wrestler from Ulaanbaatar. He was recruited by the former yokozuna Hakuhō, and had been regarded as his protégé. He made his professional debut in March 2020 with the Miyagino stable, and won his first 21 matches. His highest achieved rank was maegashira 6.

After the January 2024 tournament, allegations of assaults by Hokuseihō against fellow rikishi in his stable led to an investigation by the Sumo Association, which later verified them. On 22 February 2024, the day before the full Sumo Association board met to take up the committee's recommendations, Hokuseihō submitted his retirement notification.

== Career ==
Hokuseihō was born Ariunaa Davaaninj on 12 November 2001 in Ulaanbaatar, Mongolia. He moved to Sapporo, Hokkaido at the age of five. On his way to a temporary return trip to Mongolia he met yokozuna Hakuhō by chance at an airport in South Korea, who encouraged him to try sumo. From his fourth to sixth year of elementary school, he took part in wanpaku sumo competitions, and studied sumo at junior high school in Tottori City. Hokuseihō quit the sumo club after he found the training too intense, but Hakuhō persuaded him to return. After graduating, Hokuseihō enrolled at Tottori Jōhoku High School, known for its strong sumo program, again at Hakuhō's recommendation. Previous attendees of this school are Terunofuji and Ichinojō. He won several high school sumo competitions, and after graduating, he joined Hakuhō at Miyagino stable. Although born in Mongolia, as he had been residing in Japan since five years old, he was able to obtain Japanese nationality and so did not need Miyagino's one foreigner spot (sumo rules allow for only one foreign-born wrestler per stable).

He listed Hokkaido as his birthplace on the banzuke ranking sheets and was given the shikona of Hokuseihō. His debut was in March 2020, at a tournament with no spectators to due coronavirus restrictions. There he made his debut at the same time as Shishi, the first Ukrainian to join professional sumo, and Hōzan Takamori, the second son of former sekiwake Takatōriki and older brother of Ōhō. With the May 2020 tournament being cancelled altogether, his first official tournament with a ranking was in July 2020. In his first three tournaments, he won all 21 of his matches, to equal the fifth longest record start to a professional career in sumo history. He won the yūshō or championship in each of the jonokuchi, jonidan and sandanme divisions. He had to sit out the January 2021 tournament, which would have been his debut in the makushita division, due to Hakuhō testing positive for COVID-19 and his whole stable being withdrawn from competition. Upon his return in March 2021 he lost his first bout in professional sumo to Tokisakae to bring his winning streak to an end, but recovered to post a 5–2 record. A 6–1 record in May was followed by a 7–0 yūshō in July which saw him promoted to the jūryō division. He became the fifth wrestler to win championships in every division from jonokuchi to makushita, and the first since Tochiazuma (now Tamanoi Oyakata). He told reporters that he was pleased to have reached jūryō in just six tournaments and while still in his teens, and said that he was aiming for double-digit wins in his first tournament as a sekitori or salaried wrestler. He said he wanted to be a yokozuna by the age of 21, like his mentor Hakuhō.

He was unable to compete in his jūryō debut after he tested positive for COVID-19, which forced the whole of the Miyagino stable to sit out the September 2021 tournament. He kept his rank for the following tournament in November 2021, but was forced to pull out on the second day with a right knee ligament injury. This resulted in his demotion back to makushita. By May 2022 he had reached makushita 2, and was a favorite to compete for the third division championship and promotion back to jūryō. After a 5–2 record, his promotion to jūryō was confirmed on May 25.

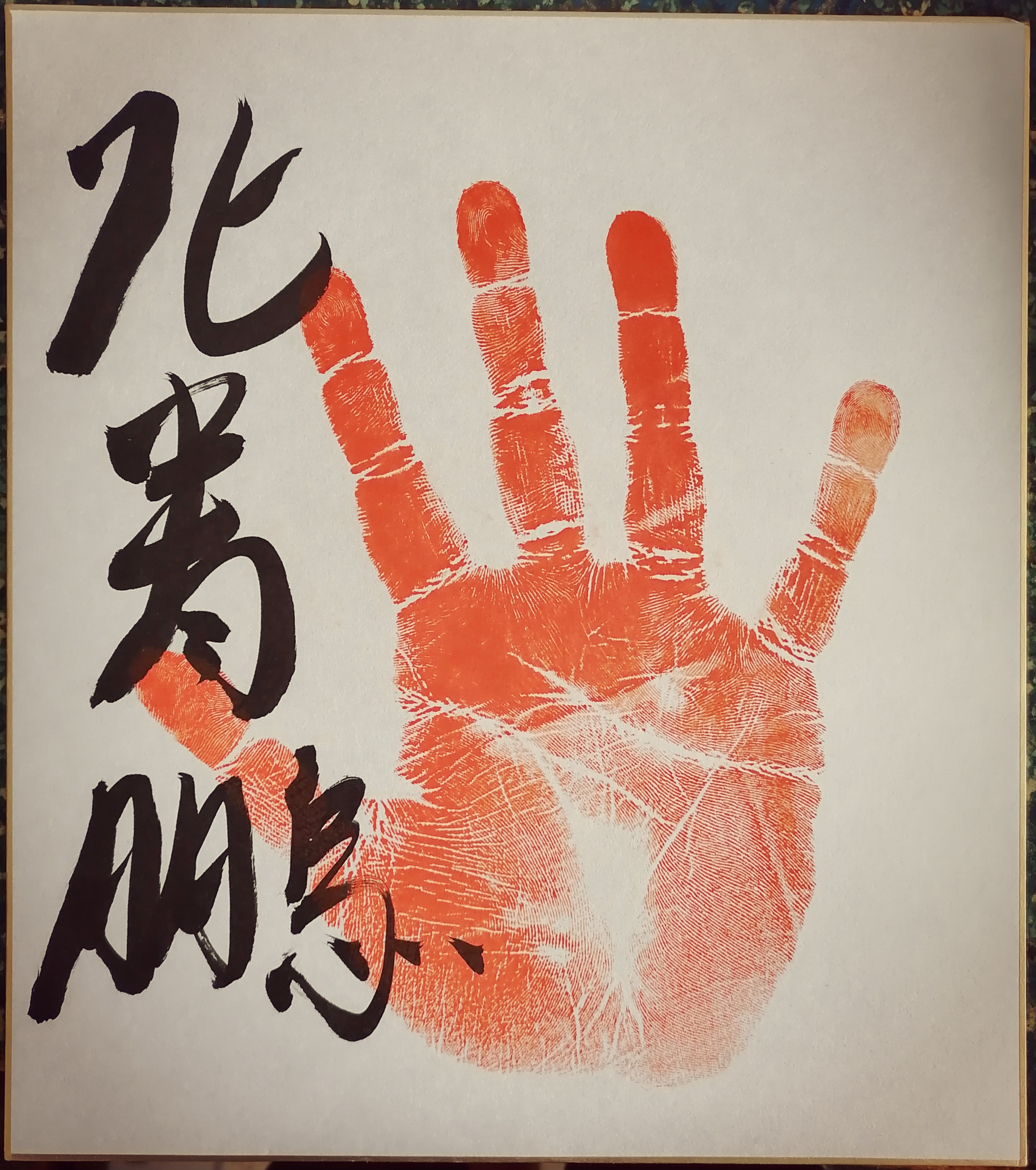
Original tegata (autograph and handprint) of sumo wrestler Hokuseiho

On the second day of the July tournament, he defeated Chiyosakae, and spoke afterwards of his relief at finally getting his first win as a sekitori in his third tournament ranked in jūryō, and the encouragement of Magaki Oyakata (the former Hakuhō), who he had once again been assigned to as an attendant after dropping to makushita. He finished the tournament with an 11–4 record, the best of his career to date. Hokuseihō's 9–6 record in the January 2023 tournament was his fourth straight winning record in jūryō, ensuring promotion to the top makuuchi division for the first time. His promotion was confirmed with the release of the March 2023 banzuke on February 27, and Hokuseihō told reporters he was aiming for promotion to sanyaku within the year. His previously reported height of 200 cm was also updated to 204 cm, making him the tallest wrestler ever in the top division since official measurements began in September 1953, alongside Akebono.

During the July 2023 tournament, Hokuseihō recorded a negative score (make-koshi) for the first time with an eighth defeat on day thirteen against Kotoshōhō. This score was worsened by a ninth defeat (the third in a row) against former sekiwake Meisei the next day. After finishing this tournament with a score of 5–10, Hokuseihō was relegated to maegashira 11. At the September 2023 tournament, he and Daieishō remained neck-and-neck with tournament leaders Atamifuji and Takakeishō, recording only one more defeat than the latter and being able to force his way into a kettei-sen (playoff). Hokuseihō was also promised the Outstanding Performance Prize if he recorded an eleventh victory. On the final day of the tournament, however, Hokuseihō was defeated by ōzeki Hōshōryū, effectively taking him out of the title race and removing his hopes of receiving the award.

During the November 2023 tournament, Hokuseihō had a notable match with Midorifuji on day seven; the match being between the tallest and lightest wrestler in the division. The match also received attention after lasting a total of 6 minutes 40 seconds, and being marked by a very rare mizu-iri (water break), an event that had not happened in makuuchi for 8 years, since day fourteen of the March 2015 tournament during the match between Terunofuji and Ichinojō. Following his match, he also received criticism from his master, who encouraged him to win quick victories without getting bogged down in long matches, too costly in terms of stamina for a full tournament.

=== Assault allegations and retirement ===
Following a victory over Shōnannoumi on Day 5 of the January 2024 tournament, Hokuseihō withdrew from competition. Stablemaster Miyagino said that Hokuseihō's right knee condition had worsened, and that he would not be returning to the tournament. Hokuseihō announced the next day that he had suffered a meniscus injury, and was planning to undergo surgery on 5 February. He was expected to require about four weeks of rehabilitation.

However, during the same period, reports of violence committed by Hokuseihō began to emerge in the press, raising suspicions that Hokuseihō's withdrawal would also be to keep him away from the ring and put him on enforced rest. In February, it was confirmed by the Sumo Association's Compliance Committee that Hokuseihō had assaulted several stablemates and had stolen money from them, and that an investigation had been launched after one of them made a formal complaint to the association. Further details later emerged that for over a year Hokuseihō had mistreated other wrestlers by striking them with sticks made from pieces of mawashi and abusing them using a combination of insecticides and burners. Summoned to inform him that disciplinary proceedings had been launched against him, Hokuseihō simply told the press that he was "honestly remorseful".

The Sumo Association planned to hold an emergency board meeting to discuss the Compliance Committee's report, which included a recommendation that Hokuseihō retire and that stablemaster Miyagino be demoted two positions in sumo's hierarchy. The day before the meeting, on 22 February 2024, it was reported that Hokuseihō did not show up to his stable. On the same day it was announced that Hokuseihō had submitted his notification of retirement. On 23 February, the Sumo Association board accepted the committee's report. In the case of Hokuseihō, the board did not take any formal disciplinary action and accepted his retirement papers instead. Following the board meeting, Hokuseihō said to the press: "I deeply regret having used violence against my stablemates."

Despite the circumstances that led to his departure from the Sumo Association, it has been pointed out by several sources that Hokuseihō wanted to hold a haircutting ceremony in April. However, it was reported he had not yet cut his chonmage on the occasion of his first public appearance after the scandal when he attended a training session at Arashio stable in September. On 1 June 2025, he appeared at the retirement ceremony for former maegashira Kyokutaisei, with his long hair tied up in a bun.

== Fighting style ==
At 204 cm (6 ft 8 in) Hokuseihō was the tallest sekitori during his professional years, and with his big height advantage he was able to overwhelm most of his early opponents by quickly grabbing their mawashi and forcing them out of the dohyō. He won most of his matches by yorikiri (force out) and preferred a migi-yotsu (left hand outside, right hand inside) position. Hokuseihō's style, in which he remained firmly and passively supported on his legs, had been criticized by his master as being dangerous for the health of his knees, particularly during the January 2024 tournament from which Hokuseihō had to withdraw after a knee injury.

In the run-up to the Nagoya tournament in July 2023, he also confided that he was beginning to practise pushing and thrusting techniques (tsuki/oshi) in order to diversify his fighting style, taking particular inspiration from the matches of former yokozuna Akebono.

== Career record ==
Hokuseihō Osamu
Year	January Hatsu basho, Tokyo	March Haru basho, Osaka	May Natsu basho, Tokyo	July Nagoya basho, Nagoya	September Aki basho, Tokyo	November Kyūshū basho, Fukuoka
2020	x	(Maezumo)	East Jonokuchi #23; Tournament Cancelled; State of Emergency; 0–0–0	East Jonokuchi #23; 7–0; Champion	West Jonidan #15; 7–0; Champion	West Sandanme #12; 7–0; Champion
2021	West Makushita #15; Sat out due to COVID rules 0–0–7	West Makushita #15; 5–2	East Makushita #9; 6–1	West Makushita #2; 7–0; Champion	West Jūryō #12; Sat out due to COVID rules 0–0–15	West Jūryō #12; 0–2–13
2022	West Makushita #12; 5–2	West Makushita #5; 5–2	East Makushita #2; 5–2	West Jūryō #13; 11–4	East Jūryō #9; 9–6	East Jūryō #6; 10–5
2023	East Jūryō #2; 9–6	East Maegashira #15; 9–6	East Maegashira #11; 8–7	West Maegashira #6; 5–10	West Maegashira #11; 10–5	East Maegashira #7; 7–8
2024	East Maegashira #8; 2–4–9	East Jūryō #3; Retired –	x	x	x	x
Record given as wins–losses–absences Top division champion Top division runner-up Retired Lower divisions Non-participation Sanshō key: F=Fighting spirit; O=Outstanding performance; T=Technique Also shown: ★=Kinboshi; P=Playoff(s); Divisions: Makuuchi — Jūryō — Makushita — Sandanme — Jonidan — Jonokuchi Makuuchi ranks: Yokozuna — Ōzeki — Sekiwake — Komusubi — Maegashira

== See also ==
- Glossary of sumo terms
- List of past sumo wrestlers
- List of Mongolian sumo wrestlers
- List of non-Japanese sumo wrestlers
