= Takakento Terutora =

Japanese sumo wrestler

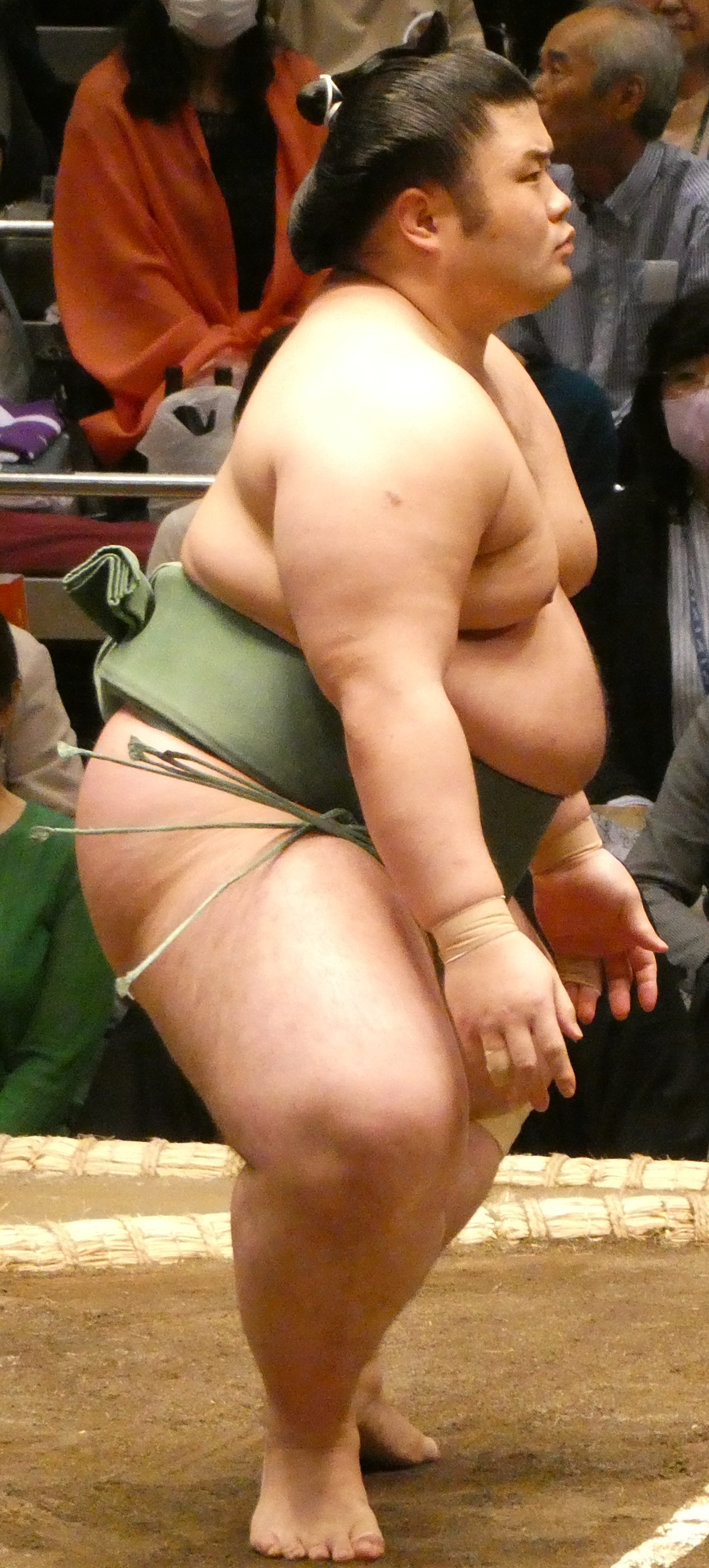
- Takakento in May 2023

Personal information
- Native name: 貴健斗 輝虎
- Born: Kento Mizuta; February 10, 1996 (age 30) Yatsushiro, Kumamoto Prefecture; Japan
- Height: 1.80 m (5 ft 11 in)
- Weight: 169 kg (373 lb)

Sport
- Sport: Sumo
- Rank: see below
- Heya: Takanohana → Minatogawa
- Debut: January 2014
- Highest rank: Jūryō 4 (July, 2021)
- Updated on 26 November 2023

Takakento Terutora (貴健斗 輝虎), born February 10, 1996, as Kento Mizuta (水田 健斗, Mizuta Kento) is a Japanese professional sumo wrestler from Yatsushiro, Kumamoto. Wrestling for Minatogawa stable (the former Tokiwayama stable), his highest rank is jūryō 4.

== Early life and sumo experience ==
Born in Yatsushiro in 1996, he began wrestling in the 5th grade at the age of 10. When he was in middle school, he met former yokozuna Takanohana Kōji, who had come to observe a training session. He maintained his relationship with the former yokozuna after joining Tottori Jōhoku High School's prestigious sumo club and participated in training camps organized by Takanohana. In his third year, he became the captain of the club and led it to the number one position in Japan notably winning the Tokyo National Athletic Championships. During his high school years, he notably met Bushōzan who was the captain of the rival team of Saitama Sakae High School, another prestigious sumo club. As a result, Bushōzan and his team notably inflicted a defeat on Takakento and Jōhoku High in the team tournament at the 2013 National High School Tournament. In 2014, Takakento joined Takanohana's stable, while Bushōzan joined Fujishima stable, and began a friendly rivalry with him, saying "I don't want to lose (to him)". Other Yatsushiro recruits from that year included the current Genbumaru (Onoe stable).

== Career ==
Wrestling under his real name (Mizuta Kento), he made his debut in maezumō and got 3 wins out of 4 matches. During his first honbasho in March, 2014 saw him post a record of 5–2. In March 2015, Takakento was competing to win the makushita division championship but failed on the last day against veteran makushita wrestler Dewahayate. In November of the same year, he injured his left knee which caused him to fall to sandanme, the third division in the sport. In July 2016, he was given the shikona, or ring name, Takakento, a combination of the first kanji character of his master's name (Takanohana) and his real first name (Kento). The first name of his shikona was given to him to evoke one of the names of Uesugi Kenshin (Uesugi Terutora). When Takanohana retired in 2018, Takakento was transferred to Chiganoura stable (currently called Tokiwayama stable). At the time, he was the uchi-deshi, or attendant, of ōzeki Takakeishō and Takakento often praise the ōzeki who helped him to train and prepare mentally.
Takakento wrestled in makushita for almost five years but, following strong results in 2020 and January 2021, he was promoted to jūryō, sumo's second highest division, for the March tournament along Bushōzan, Ichiyamamoto and Nishikifuji. He lost jūryō status after the September 2021 tournament, but was promoted back in March 2022. He finished that tournament at seven wins and eight losses, remaining at the same rank for the next tournament due to the balance of promotion and demotion. In May, he again scored 7–8, and was demoted to makushita after losing to Chiyosakae on the final day. Takakento, however, regained his jūryō rank in July of the same year. Takakento continued his career in jūryō in January 2023 and was the first opponent of former ōzeki Asanoyama who, returning from suspension, was moving up in the rankings. In March 2023, he faced and was defeated by fellow Jōhoku High alumni, Ochiai Tetsuya, who expressed his respect for him for having been the captain of his team when he was in fourth grade himself.

== Fighting style ==
Takakento mainly uses oshi-zumō techniques, or pushing attacks, with the majority of his kimarite wins coming via oshidashi.

== Career record ==
Takakento Terutora
Year	January Hatsu basho, Tokyo	March Haru basho, Osaka	May Natsu basho, Tokyo	July Nagoya basho, Nagoya	September Aki basho, Tokyo	November Kyūshū basho, Fukuoka
2014	(Maezumō)	West Jonokuchi #13; 5–2	West Jonidan #52; 6–1	East Sandanme #83; 6–1	East Sandanme #24; 5–2	East Makushita #60; 5–2
2015	West Makushita #38; 2–5	West Makushita #57; 6–1	East Makushita #26; 2–5	West Makushita #49; 4–3	West Makushita #42; 4–3	East Makushita #36; 1–3–3
2016	East Sandanme #4; 2–5	West Sandanme #29; 3–4	East Sandanme #42; 6–1	East Makushita #55; 4–3	West Makushita #46; 4–3	East Makushita #36; 2–5
2017	East Makushita #52; 3–4	East Sandanme #8; 4–3	East Makushita #59; 5–2	East Makushita #39; 3–4	West Makushita #48; 5–2	West Makushita #34; 5–2
2018	West Makushita #24; 4–3	East Makushita #20; 4–3	West Makushita #14; 3–4	West Makushita #20; 3–4	West Makushita #26; 3–4	East Makushita #36; 5–2
2019	East Makushita #23; 3–4	East Makushita #27; 6–1	West Makushita #10; 2–5	East Makushita #20; 4–3	East Makushita #18; 3–4	East Makushita #23; 2–5
2020	East Makushita #38; 5–2	East Makushita #23; 5–2	East Makushita #13; Tournament Cancelled; State of Emergency; 0–0–0	East Makushita #13; 4–3	West Makushita #8; 4–3	East Makushita #6; 5–2
2021	West Makushita #1; 5–2	West Jūryō #11; 7–8	West Jūryō #11; 10–5	West Jūryō #4; 3–12	East Jūryō #13; 3–12	West Makushita #6; 4–3
2022	East Makushita #3; 4–3	East Jūryō #14; 7–8	East Jūryō #14; 7–8	East Makushita #1; 4–3	West Jūryō #14; 9–6	West Jūryō #11; 7–8
2023	East Jūryō #12; 7–8	West Jūryō #12; 10–5	East Jūryō #7; 6–9	East Jūryō #8; 7–8	East Jūryō #9; 6–9	West Jūryō #9; 3–12
2024	East Makushita #3; Sat out due to injury 0–0–7	West Makushita #43; Sat out due to injury 0–0–7	West Sandanme #23; 6–1	West Makushita #44; 5–2	West Makushita #27; 5–2	West Makushita #14; 4–3
2025	West Makushita #9; 4–3	East Makushita #7; 3–4	East Makushita #12; 5–2	West Makushita #5; 4–3	East Makushita #2; 4–3	East Makushita #1; 3–4
2026	East Makushita #4; 4–3	East Makushita #3; 4–3	East Makushita #1; 2–5	West Makushita #8; 2–5	East Makushita #20; 2–5	East Makushita #34; 4–3
Record given as wins–losses–absences Top division champion Top division runner-up Retired Non-participation Jūryō Lower divisions Sanshō key: F=Fighting spirit; O=Outstanding performance; T=Technique Also shown: ★=Kinboshi; P=Playoff(s); Divisions: Makuuchi — Jūryō — Makushita — Sandanme — Jonidan — Jonokuchi Makuuchi ranks: Yokozuna — Ōzeki — Sekiwake — Komusubi — Maegashira

== See also ==
- Glossary of sumo terms
- List of active sumo wrestlers
