= Nabatame Tatsuya =

Japanese sumo wrestler (born 2002)

Personal information
- Native name: 生田目 竜也
- Born: Nabatame Tatsuya; February 22, 2002 (age 24) Sakura, Tochigi, Japan
- Height: 1.77 m (5 ft 9 1/2 in)
- Weight: 168 kg (370 lb; 26.5 st)

Sport
- Sport: Sumo
- Rank: see below
- Heya: Futagoyama
- Debut: January 2020
- Highest rank: Jūryō 5 (March 2025)
- Updated on August 19, 2026

Nabatame Tatsuya (Japanese: 生田目 竜也; born February 22, 2002 as Nabatame Tatsuya (竜也 生田目, Tatsuya Nabatame)) is a Japanese professional sumo wrestler. He is a member of Futagoyama stable. He made his debut in January 2020 and reached the second-highest jūryō division in July 2024.

== Early life and sumo background ==
Nabatame is the son of a Japanese father and a Thai mother. His father left while he was in elementary school, leaving Nabatame's mother to raise him and his younger brother alone. The difficult situation eventually led to Nabatame being placed in a children's home at the age of 14. His mother visited him regularly during that time, and Nabatame has stated that his desire to repay her love is a source of strength for him in his sumo journey.

Nabatame attended Yaita High School and trained in the school's sumo club. During this time he placed second in the Kanto High School Sumo Invitational Tournament.

== Career ==
Nabatame was recruited to Futagoyama stable by the stablemaster (former ōzeki Miyabiyama). He made his professional debut in the January 2020 tournament. Nabatame adopted his family name, Nabatame, as his ring name but has expressed a desire to be named after his master someday. During the May 2024 tournament, Nabatame finally secured his promotion to jūryō when he defeated jūryō debutant Kazekenō in a promotion-demotion match on day 15 and finishing with a 5–2 record at Makushita 2 west.

Nabatame made his sekitori debut in the July 2024 tournament at the rank of jūryō 14 west, becoming the second sekitori produced by Futagoyama stable, after Rōga, and the tenth from Tochigi Prefecture in the post-war era.

== Fighting style ==
Nabatame is an oshi-sumo specialist, preferring pushing and thrusting techniques to grabbing the opponent's belt. Oshidashi (push out), tsukidashi (thrust out), and tsukitaoshi (thrust down) account for about 75% of his recorded wins.

== Career record ==
Nabatame Tatsuya
Year	January Hatsu basho, Tokyo	March Haru basho, Osaka	May Natsu basho, Tokyo	July Nagoya basho, Nagoya	September Aki basho, Tokyo	November Kyūshū basho, Fukuoka
2020	(Maezumō)	East Jonokuchi #23; 5–2	West Jonidan #75; Tournament Cancelled; State of Emergency; 0–0–0	West Jonidan #75; 6–1	West Jonidan #4; 6–1	West Sandanme #44; 5–2
2021	East Sandanme #18; 1–1–5	East Sandanme #51; 5–2	East Sandanme #24; 5–2	East Makushita #60; 4–3	West Makushita #50; 6–1	West Makushita #20; 2–5
2022	West Makushita #34; 3–4	West Makushita #46; 3–4	East Makushita #52; 3–4	East Makushita #59; 4–3	West Makushita #49; 6–1	West Makushita #22; 3–4
2023	East Makushita #30; 4–3	West Makushita #24; 6–1	East Makushita #9; 3–4	West Makushita #11; 4–3	East Makushita #7; 2–4–1	West Makushita #16; 4–3
2024	East Makushita #12; 5–2	West Makushita #5; 4–3	West Makushita #2; 5–2	West Jūryō #14; 4–11	East Makushita #4; 4–3	East Jūryō #14; 7–8
2025	East Jūryō #14; 11–4	East Jūryō #5; 3–8–4	West Jūryō #12; 8–7	West Jūryō #10; Sat out due to injury 0–0–15	East Makushita #8; Sat out due to injury 0–0–7	West Makushita #48; Sat out due to injury 0–0–7
2026	West Sandanme #28; 5–2	West Sandanme #3; 7–0; Champion	West Makushita #10; 5–2	West Makushita #3; 6–1–P	East Jūryō #10; 9–6	West Jūryō #6; 10–5
Record given as wins–losses–absences Top division champion Top division runner-up Retired Non-participation Jūryō Lower divisions Sanshō key: F=Fighting spirit; O=Outstanding performance; T=Technique Also shown: ★=Kinboshi; P=Playoff(s); Divisions: Makuuchi — Jūryō — Makushita — Sandanme — Jonidan — Jonokuchi Makuuchi ranks: Yokozuna — Ōzeki — Sekiwake — Komusubi — Maegashira

== See also ==
- Glossary of sumo terms
- List of active sumo wrestlers
