= Shimazuumi Sora =

Japanese sumo wrestler

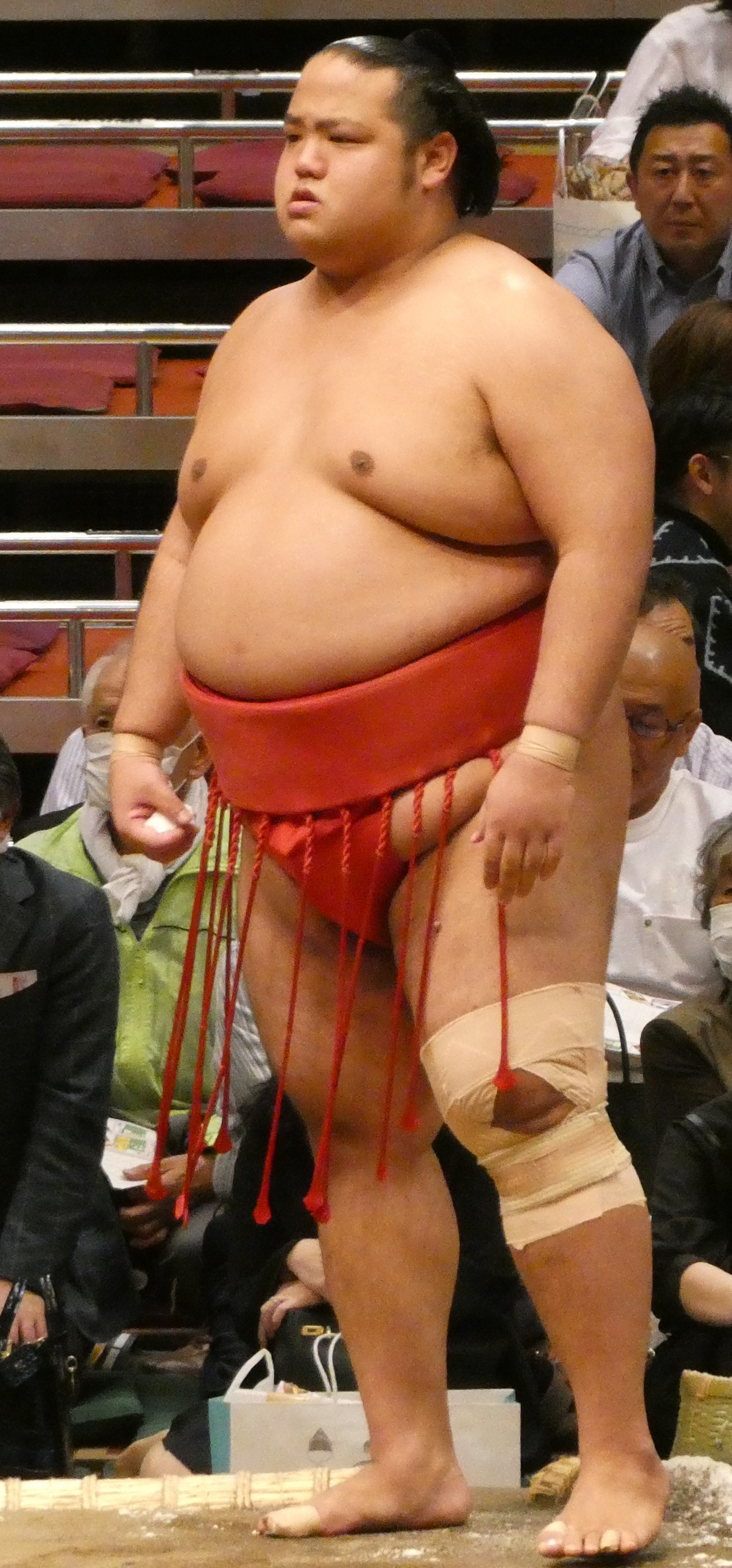

Personal information
- Native name: 島津海 空
- Born: Sora Nakazono; May 18, 1996 (age 30) Nishinoomote, Kagoshima, Japan
- Height: 1.75 m (5 ft 9 in)
- Weight: 161 kg (355 lb; 25.4 st)

Sport
- Sport: Sumo
- Rank: see below
- Heya: Hanaregoma
- Debut: March 2012
- Highest rank: Maegashira 12 (March, 2024)
- Championships: 1 (Makushita)
- Updated on September 26, 2025

Shimazuumi Sora (Japanese: 島津海 空; born Nakazono Sora (中園 空, Sora Nakazono) on May 18, 1996) is a Japanese professional sumo wrestler from Nishinoomote, Kagoshima. He debuted in sumo wrestling in March 2012 and made his jūryō debut in March 2022. His highest rank has been maegashira 12. He wrestles for Hanaregoma.

== Early life ==
Nakazono Sora was born in Nishinoomote, Kagoshima, an area renowned for its popularity of sumo. Despite this, he played basketball in elementary and junior high school, although he also participated in some local regional sumo tournaments. His father was a prominent local sumo wrestler who had competed against and befriended Matsugane Oyakata (former ōzeki Wakashimazu). Due to this connection, Nakazono was invited to watch sumo live during his third year of junior high school. Impressed, Nakazon joined Matsugane stable, even though he had no prior sumo experience.

== Career ==
=== Early career ===
Nakazono made his professional debut in March 2012 alongside future sekitori Ōsunaarashi, Daikiho, and Gokushindo. He was promoted to sandanme in January 2013 and makushita in July 2016. In March 2017, Nakazono won his first six matches, but missed out on the sandanme yusho after losing to Tamakongo on the last day. In May 2017 he would serve as tsukebito to Yokozuna Kisenosato who joined sumo straight from junior high school like himself and for whom he had much respect. After missing out on the championship, Nakazono began training more intently and rose up to makushita 11 two tournaments in July 2017. However, he injured his right knee prior to the tournament at the Nishonoseki ichimon-geiko and sat out of the entire tournament. He re-injured his right knee in 2019 which forced him to miss two consecutive tournaments, causing him to fall down to the rank of sandanme 65 in May 2019. Upon returning, he quickly returned to makushita in September 2019 and rose as high as makushita 4 in January 2021. He was finally given a proper shikona of "Shimazuumi" (島津海) in May 2021 after wrestling under his surname for over nine years. In January 2022, while ranked at makushita 2, he finished with a 4–3 record and was promoted to juryo in March 2022.

=== Jūryō promotion ===
Shimazuumi finished with an 8–7 record in his first tournament as a sekitori and was promoted to a career-best juryo 10 for the May 2022 tournament. Shimazuumi and his stable were forced to withdraw on Day 9 of the July 2022 tournament in Nagoya after stablemaster Hanaregoma tested positive for COVID-19. In November 2023 at a career high of juryo 2 he would finish 9-6 putting him in contention for Makuuchi promotion.

=== Makuuchi promotion ===
Shimazuumi was promoted to the makuuchi division for the first time at the first tournament in 2024. During this tournament, he won five consecutive matches between days 9 and 13. He was listed as a potential recipient of the Fighting Spirit prize if he were to claim a tenth victory on the final day, but lost his bout to Meisei and did not receive the award.

Shimazuumi was promoted to the rank of maegashira 12 for the March 2024 tournament, but on Day 4 he withdrew after being diagnosed with a tear in his left gastrocnemius muscle, a part of the calf, which reportedly occurred during his match against Churanoumi the previous day. His medical certificate indicated a period of three weeks for recovery. This withdrawal would drop him into the Jūryō division for the May 2024 basho. He would struggle with injuries over the next year, dropping out of salaried status altogether after the January 2025 tournament. Shimazuumi won the Makushita Yusho in September of that year, and a 6-1 from makushita 6 in January 2026 saw him repromoted to Jūryō after a year in makushita. However, after winning his first two bouts, he lost eight matches straight. He withdrew on Day 11, citing a meniscus tear in his knee. His withdrawal makes his demotion back to the makushita division a certainty.

== Fighting style ==
Shimazuumi's favored techniques are listed at the Sumo Association as moro-zashi (a double hand inside grip on the opponent's mawashi) and yori (forcing). His most common winning kimarite is yorikiri (force out).

== Career record ==
Shimazuumi Sora
Year	January Hatsu basho, Tokyo	March Haru basho, Osaka	May Natsu basho, Tokyo	July Nagoya basho, Nagoya	September Aki basho, Tokyo	November Kyūshū basho, Fukuoka
2012	x	(Maezumō)	East Jonokuchi #14; 5–2	East Jonidan #69; 4–3	East Jonidan #39; 4–3	East Jonidan #18; 4–3
2013	West Sandanme #99; 3–4	West Jonidan #12; 2–5	East Jonidan #54; 4–3	East Jonidan #28; 5–2	West Sandanme #95; 5–2	West Sandanme #62; 3–4
2014	West Sandanme #78; Sat out due to injury 0–0–7	East Jonidan #39; 5–2	West Jonidan #2; 3–4	East Jonidan #24; 4–3	West Jonidan #5; 5–2	East Sandanme #70; 5–2
2015	East Sandanme #39; 3–4	East Sandanme #54; 3–4	West Sandanme #74; 6–1	East Sandanme #20; 3–4	East Sandanme #37; 4–3	East Sandanme #20; 2–5
2016	East Sandanme #48; 5–2	West Sandanme #21; 4–3	East Sandanme #11; 4–3	East Makushita #60; 3–4	East Sandanme #12; 2–5	East Sandanme #40; 5–2
2017	East Sandanme #13; 4–3	West Sandanme #2; 6–1	East Makushita #29; 6–1	West Makushita #11; Sat out due to injury 0–0–7	West Makushita #51; 4–3	West Makushita #41; 3–4
2018	West Makushita #52; 4–3	East Makushita #44; 5–2	East Makushita #27; 5–2	West Makushita #16; 5–2	East Makushita #8; 3–4	West Makushita #16; 3–4
2019	West Makushita #25; Sat out due to injury 0–0–7	West Sandanme #5; Sat out due to injury 0–0–7	West Sandanme #65; 6–1	East Sandanme #10; 5–2	West Makushita #51; 5–2	East Makushita #36; 3–4
2020	West Makushita #42; 4–3	East Makushita #33; 4–3	West Makushita #27; Tournament Cancelled; State of Emergency; 0–0–0	West Makushita #27; 4–3	West Makushita #18; 5–2	East Makushita #9; 5–2
2021	East Makushita #4; 3–5	West Makushita #10; 4–3	East Makushita #8; 4–3	West Makushita #5; 2–6	West Makushita #16; 5–2	East Makushita #6; 4–3
2022	West Makushita #2; 4–3	West Jūryō #13; 8–7	East Jūryō #10; 7–8	East Jūryō #10; 5–4–6	East Jūryō #10; 6–9	East Jūryō #13; 8–7
2023	West Jūryō #11; 9–6	West Jūryō #7; 8–7	West Jūryō #6; 8–7	West Jūryō #3; 5–10	East Jūryō #6; 9–6	West Jūryō #2; 9–6
2024	East Maegashira #17; 9–6	West Maegashira #12; 0–4–11	West Jūryō #7; 5–8–2	West Jūryō #10; 10–5	West Jūryō #4; 6–5–4	East Jūryō #5; 5–10
2025	East Jūryō #10; 3–12	East Makushita #3; Sat out due to injury 0–0–7	West Makushita #43; 4–3	West Makushita #33; 5–2	East Makushita #20; 7–0; Champion	West Makushita #2; 3–4
2026	West Makushita #5; 6–1	East Jūryō #13; 2–9–4	East Makushita #9; Sat out due to injury 0–0–7	West Makushita #49; 5–2	West Makushita #33; 4–3	West Makushita #26; 3–4
Record given as wins–losses–absences Top division champion Top division runner-up Retired Non-participation Jūryō Lower divisions Sanshō key: F=Fighting spirit; O=Outstanding performance; T=Technique Also shown: ★=Kinboshi; P=Playoff(s); Divisions: Makuuchi — Jūryō — Makushita — Sandanme — Jonidan — Jonokuchi Makuuchi ranks: Yokozuna — Ōzeki — Sekiwake — Komusubi — Maegashira

== See also ==
- Glossary of sumo terms
- List of active sumo wrestlers
