= Bushōzan Kotarō =

Japanese sumo wrestler (born 1995)

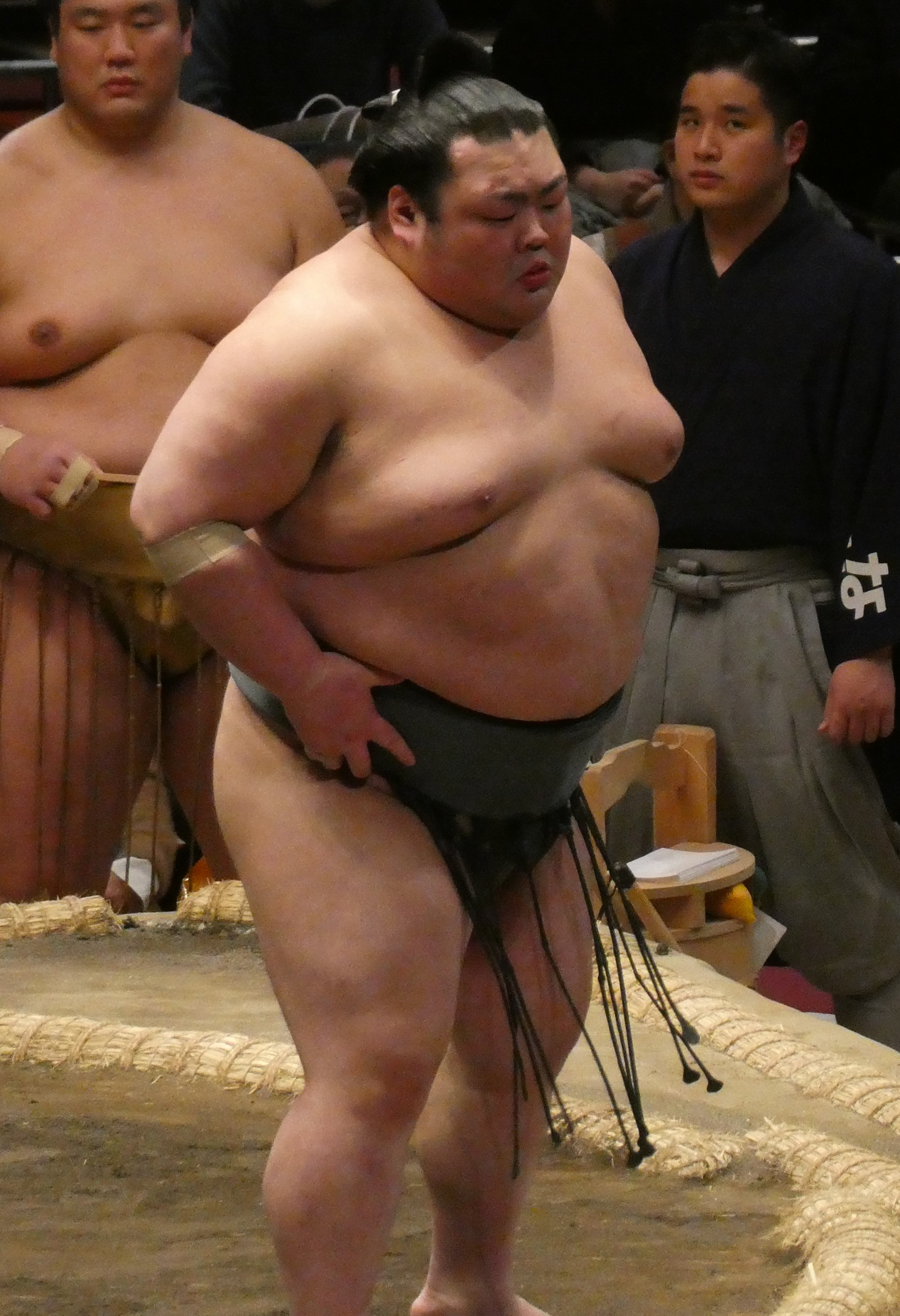
- Fujiwara in 2022

Personal information
- Native name: 武将山 虎太郎
- Born: Kotaro Fujiwara; 6 December 1995 (age 30) Mito, Ibaraki
- Height: 1.72 m (5 ft 8 in)
- Weight: 170 kg (370 lb; 27 st)

Sport
- Sport: Sumo
- Rank: see below
- Heya: Fujishima
- Debut: January 2014
- Highest rank: Maegashira 12 (September 2024)
- Updated on 26 November 2023

Bushōzan Kotarō (Japanese: 武将山 虎太郎; born 6 December 1995 as Kotaro Fujiwara (藤原 虎太郎, Fujiwara Kotarō)) is a Japanese professional sumo wrestler from Mito, Ibaraki. His debut in maezumō was in January 2014. His highest rank has been maegashira 12.

== Early life ==
Born 6 December 1995, Fujiwara would start sumo in his second year of elementary school after joining a sumo club run by the father of ōzeki Musōyama. In the fourth year he would even be involved in the retirement ceremony for the ōzeki. In his sixth year of elementary he would progress to the point of getting third in the All-Japan Elementary School Sumo Tournament. After middle school Fujiwara would attend the prestigious high school sumo program of Saitama Sakae High School. In his second year there he would win the National high school selection sumo tournament, and in his third year while captaining the team would finish top 5 in the same competition.

== Career ==
After high school in January 2014, he would join Fujishima stable to be under the guidance of his mentor Musoyama. He would make his debut under the name Kotaro (虎太郎) alongside the likes of Ichinojō, Tsurugishō, and Takakento. He would make a quick work of the three lowest division and would debut in makushita by the end of the year. In July 2015, he would suffer a 0-7 make-koshi record that would see him demoted back to sandanme but, after finishing with a 5–2 record would immediately be promoted back up. In January 2016, he participated in an eight-man playoff for the makushita yūshō after producing a strong 6–1 record, but he lost in the first round to Tochimaru. In May 2018, he changed his shikona from his family name to Bushōzan (武将山). After the shikona change he began producing more consistent results and spent more time in the top quarter of makushita. After 4-3 kachi-koshi in January 2021 at makushita 2 would see him promoted to the sekitori ranks of jūryō. His promotion made him the first sekitori produced by his stablemaster Musōyama and the first for his stable in five years. He would record a 7-8 make-koshi record in his debut in jūryō but would retain his same rank for the following basho. He would follow this up with a 10-5 kachi-koshi record and from there steadily rise up the ranks. In January 2022, at a career high rank of jūryō 1 he would start the basho with ten straight losses before finally getting a win on day 11, he would then lose three more bouts before winning on the final day to finish 2–13, his worst record since March 2018.

In March 2023, he was promoted to the top makuuchi division for the first time. He is the first wrestler from Fujishima stable to reach the top division since Tsurugidake in November 2011.

== Fighting style ==
Bushōzan is an oshi-sumo wrestler who prefers pushing and thrusting techniques to fighting on the mawashi. His most common kimarite used was a straightforward oshi-dashi, or push out.

== Career record ==
Bushōzan Kotarō
Year	January Hatsu basho, Tokyo	March Haru basho, Osaka	May Natsu basho, Tokyo	July Nagoya basho, Nagoya	September Aki basho, Tokyo	November Kyūshū basho, Fukuoka
2014	(Maezumō)	West Jonokuchi #15; 6–1	East Jonidan #25; 5–2	East Sandanme #87; 6–1	West Sandanme #27; 6–1	West Makushita #45; 4–3
2015	West Makushita #36; 3–4	East Makushita #45; 3–4	West Makushita #55; 4–3	West Makushita #45; 0–7	West Sandanme #20; 5–2	West Makushita #56; 4–3
2016	East Makushita #47; 6–1–P	East Makushita #20; 4–3	West Makushita #14; 3–4	West Makushita #19; 3–4	West Makushita #28; 4–3	East Makushita #23; 3–4
2017	East Makushita #29; 4–3	West Makushita #25; 4–3	West Makushita #19; 4–3	West Makushita #15; 2–5	East Makushita #30; 4–3	West Makushita #24; 4–3
2018	East Makushita #19; 3–4	East Makushita #26; 1–6	East Makushita #56; 4–3	East Makushita #46; 5–2	West Makushita #29; 5–2	East Makushita #19; 4–3
2019	East Makushita #15; 3–4	East Makushita #21; 4–3	West Makushita #15; 5–2	East Makushita #9; 3–4	East Makushita #13; 1–3–3	East Makushita #35; 5–2
2020	West Makushita #23; 4–3	East Makushita #18; 3–4	West Makushita #22; Tournament Cancelled; State of Emergency; 0–0–0	West Makushita #22; 5–2	West Makushita #10; 5–2	East Makushita #4; 4–3
2021	East Makushita #2; 4–3	East Jūryō #14; 7–8	East Jūryō #14; 10–5	East Jūryō #8; 8–7	West Jūryō #5; 8–7	West Jūryō #3; 8–7
2022	West Jūryō #1; 2–13	West Jūryō #9; 6–9	West Jūryō #10; 9–6	West Jūryō #6; 8–7	West Jūryō #4; 8–7	West Jūryō #2; 8–7
2023	West Jūryō #1; 9–6	West Maegashira #14; 5–10	East Jūryō #3; 10–5	West Maegashira #16; 3–12	West Jūryō #5; 9–6	East Jūryō #2; 10–5
2024	West Maegashira #16; 4–11	East Jūryō #5; 9–6	East Jūryō #2; 9–6	West Maegashira #16; 8–7	East Maegashira #12; 4–11	West Maegashira #17; 3–8–4
2025	West Jūryō #7; Sat out due to injury 0–0–15	East Makushita #5; Sat out due to injury 0–0–7	West Makushita #45; 2–5	West Sandanme #2; 4–3	East Makushita #52; 5–2	West Makushita #31; 3–4
2026	West Makushita #40; 4–3	East Makushita #32; Sat out due to injury 0–0–7	West Sandanme #12; 2–5	East Sandanme #38; 4–3	East Sandanme #24; 4–3	West Sandanme #10; 6–1
Record given as wins–losses–absences Top division champion Top division runner-up Retired Non-participation Jūryō Lower divisions Sanshō key: F=Fighting spirit; O=Outstanding performance; T=Technique Also shown: ★=Kinboshi; P=Playoff(s); Divisions: Makuuchi — Jūryō — Makushita — Sandanme — Jonidan — Jonokuchi Makuuchi ranks: Yokozuna — Ōzeki — Sekiwake — Komusubi — Maegashira

== See also ==
- Glossary of sumo terms
- List of active sumo wrestlers
