= 2024 in sumo =

The following are the events in professional sumo during 2024.

== Tournaments ==
=== January ===
Ryōgoku Kokugikan, Tokyo, 14 January – 28 January

2024 Hatsu basho results - Makuuchi Division
W		L		A	East			Rank	West			W		L		A
13	-	2	-	0		(Mongolia)	**Terunofuji***	Y	ø			0	-	0	-	0
11	-	4	-	0		(Mongolia)	**Kirishima**	O	ø	(Mongolia)	**Hōshōryū**	10	-	4	-	1
0	-	0	-	0	ø			O	ø	(Japan)	Takakeishō	2	-	2	-	11
13	-	2	-	0		(Japan)	**Kotonowaka**	S		(Japan)	**Daieishō**	9	-	6	-	0
2	-	4	-	9	ø	(Japan)	Takayasu	K		(Japan)	Ura	6	-	9	-	0
10	-	5	-	0		(Japan)	**Wakamotoharu**	M1		(Japan)	Atamifuji	6	-	9	-	0
5	-	10	-	0		(Japan)	Midorifuji	M2		(Japan)	**Abi**	8	-	7	-	0
5	-	10	-	0		(Japan)	Gōnoyama	M3	ø	(Japan)	Hokutofuji	4	-	5	-	6
7	-	8	-	0		(Japan)	Tobizaru	M4		(Japan)	Shōdai	4	-	11	-	0
3	-	12	-	0		(Japan)	Ryūden	M5		(Japan)	**Nishikigi**	8	-	7	-	0
7	-	8	-	0		(Kazakhstan)	Kinbōzan	M6		(Japan)	Shōnannoumi	4	-	11	-	0
5	-	10	-	0		(Japan)	Ichiyamamoto	M7		(Japan)	**Asanoyama**	9	-	3	-	3
2	-	4	-	9	ø	(Japan)	Hokuseihō	M8		(Japan)	**Hiradoumi**	8	-	7	-	0
6	-	9	-	0		(Japan)	Mitakeumi	M9		(Japan)	**Meisei**	9	-	6	-	0
8	-	7	-	0		(Mongolia)	**Tamawashi**	M10		(Japan)	Sadanoumi	6	-	9	-	0
9	-	6	-	0		(Japan)	**Tsurugishō**	M11		(Japan)	**Ōhō**	10	-	5	-	0
10	-	5	-	0		(Japan)	**Takanoshō**	M12		(Japan)	Myōgiryū	5	-	10	-	0
7	-	8	-	0		(Japan)	Churanoumi	M13		(Japan)	Endō	5	-	10	-	0
9	-	6	-	0		(Japan)	**Kotoshōhō**	M14		(Japan)	**Ōnoshō**	10	-	5	-	0
5	-	10	-	0		(Japan)	Tomokaze	M15		(Japan)	**Ōnosato**	11	-	4	-	0
6	-	9	-	0		(Japan)	Takarafuji	M16		(Japan)	Bushōzan	4	-	11	-	0
9	-	6	-	0		(Japan)	**Shimazuumi**	M17	ø	(Bulgaria)	Aoiyama	0	-	7	-	8

ø - Indicates a pull-out or absent rank
**winning record in bold**

=== March ===
Haru basho

Osaka Prefectural Gymnasium, Osaka, 10 March – 24 March

2024 Haru basho results - Makuuchi Division
W		L		A	East			Rank	West			W		L		A
2	-	5	-	8	ø	(Mongolia)	Terunofuji	Y	ø			0	-	0	-	0
5	-	10	-	0		(Mongolia)	Kirishima	O		(Mongolia)	**Hōshōryū**	11	-	4	-	0
8	-	6	-	1	ø	(Japan)	**Takakeishō**	O		(Japan)	**Kotonowaka**	10	-	5	-	0
6	-	9	-	0		(Japan)	Daieishō	S		(Japan)	**Wakamotoharu**	9	-	6	-	0
9	-	6	-	0		(Japan)	**Abi**	K		(Japan)	Nishikigi	3	-	12	-	0
6	-	9	-	0		(Japan)	Ura	M1		(Japan)	**Asanoyama**	9	-	6	-	0
8	-	7	-	0		(Japan)	**Atamifuji**	M2		(Japan)	Meisei	6	-	9	-	0
7	-	8	-	0		(Japan)	Ōhō	M3		(Japan)	Takanoshō	5	-	10	-	0
8	-	7	-	0		(Japan)	**Tobizaru**	M4		(Japan)	**Hiradoumi**	9	-	6	-	0
7	-	8	-	0		(Japan)	Midorifuji	M5		(Japan)	**Ōnosato**	11	-	4	-	0
2	-	3	-	10	ø	(Japan)	Tsurugishō	M6		(Japan)	**Gōnoyama**	10	-	5	-	0
6	-	7	-	2		(Kazakhstan)	Kinbōzan	M7		(Mongolia)	Tamawashi	7	-	8	-	0
9	-	6	-	0		(Japan)	**Ōnoshō**	M8		(Japan)	**Takayasu**	11	-	4	-	0
6	-	9	-	0		(Japan)	Hokutofuji	M9		(Japan)	**Kotoshōhō**	8	-	7	-	0
8	-	7	-	0		(Japan)	**Shōdai**	M10		(Japan)	**Mitakeumi**	9	-	6	-	0
7	-	8	-	0		(Japan)	Ichiyamamoto	M11		(Japan)	**Sadanoumi**	8	-	7	-	0
9	-	6	-	0		(Japan)	**Shōnannoumi**	M12	ø	(Japan)	Shimazuumi	0	-	4	-	11
6	-	9	-	0		(Japan)	Ryūden	M13		(Japan)	Churanoumi	7	-	8	-	0
8	-	7	-	0		(Japan)	**Nishikifuji**	M14		(Japan)	Kitanowaka	3	-	12	-	0
6	-	9	-	0		(Japan)	Myōgiryū	M15		(Russia)	Rōga	7	-	8	-	0
5	-	10	-	0		(Japan)	Endō	M16		(Japan)	Daiamami	7	-	8	-	0
13	-	2	-	0		(Japan)	**Takerufuji**	M17	ø			0	-	0	-	0

ø - Indicates a pull-out or absent rank
**winning record in bold**
**Yūshō Winner**

=== May ===
Natsu basho

Ryōgoku Kokugikan, Tokyo, 12 May – 26 May

2024 Natsu basho results - Makuuchi Division
W		L		A	East			Rank	West			W		L		A
0	-	2	-	13	ø	(Mongolia)	Terunofuji	Y	ø			0	-	0	-	0
10	-	5	-	0		(Mongolia)	**Hōshōryū**	O		(Japan)	**Kotozakura**	11	-	4	-	0
0	-	2	-	13	ø	(Japan)	Takakeishō	O	ø	(Mongolia)	Kirishima	1	-	6	-	8
4	-	8	-	3		(Japan)	Wakamotoharu	S		(Japan)	**Abi**	10	-	5	-	0
0	-	0	-	15	ø	(Japan)	Asanoyama	K		(Japan)	**Ōnosato**	12	-	3	-	0
7	-	8	-	0		(Japan)	Atamifuji	M1		(Japan)	**Daieishō**	11	-	4	-	0
9	-	6	-	0		(Japan)	**Hiradoumi**	M2		(Japan)	Gōnoyama	6	-	9	-	0
7	-	3	-	5		(Japan)	Takayasu	M3		(Japan)	Tobizaru	6	-	9	-	0
6	-	9	-	0		(Japan)	Ōhō	M4		(Japan)	Ura	7	-	8	-	0
7	-	8	-	0		(Japan)	Ōnoshō	M5		(Japan)	**Meisei**	10	-	5	-	0
0	-	0	-	15	ø	(Japan)	Takerufuji	M6		(Japan)	Midorifuji	5	-	10	-	0
5	-	10	-	0		(Japan)	Nishikigi	M7		(Japan)	**Mitakeumi**	8	-	7	-	0
8	-	7	-	0		(Japan)	**Takanoshō**	M8		(Japan)	**Kotoshōhō**	8	-	7	-	0
7	-	8	-	0		(Mongolia)	Tamawashi	M9		(Japan)	Shōdai	7	-	8	-	0
9	-	6	-	0		(Japan)	**Shōnannoumi**	M10		(Kazakhstan)	**Kinbōzan**	8	-	7	-	0
9	-	6	-	0		(Japan)	**Sadanoumi**	M11		(Japan)	Hokutofuji	7	-	8	-	0
8	-	7	-	0		(Japan)	**Ichiyamamoto**	M12		(Japan)	Nishikifuji	5	-	10	-	0
2	-	9	-	4	ø	(Mongolia)	Mitoryū	M13		(Japan)	**Churanoumi**	8	-	7	-	0
10	-	5	-	0		(Japan)	**Ryūden**	M14		(Mongolia)	**Ōshōma**	10	-	5	-	0
6	-	9	-	0		(Japan)	Tokihayate	M15		(Russia)	Rōga	7	-	8	-	0
2	-	13	-	0		(Japan)	Tomokaze	M16		(Japan)	**Takarafuji**	9	-	6	-	0
3	-	12	-	0		(Japan)	Tsurugishō	M17	ø			0	-	0	-	0

ø - Indicates a pull-out or absent rank
**winning record in bold**
**Yūshō Winner**

=== July ===
Nagoya basho

Aichi Prefectural Gymnasium, Nagoya, 14 July – 28 July

2024 Nagoya basho results - Makuuchi Division
W		L		A	East			Rank	West			W		L		A
12	-	3	-	0		(Mongolia)	**Terunofuji***	Y	ø			0	-	0	-	0
10	-	5	-	0		(Japan)	**Kotozakura**	O	ø	(Mongolia)	**Hōshōryū**	9	-	4	-	2
0	-	0	-	0	ø			O		(Japan)	Takakeishō	5	-	10	-	0
8	-	7	-	0		(Japan)	**Abi**	S		(Japan)	**Ōnosato**	9	-	6	-	0
8	-	7	-	0		(Mongolia)	**Kirishima**	S	ø			0	-	0	-	0
8	-	7	-	0		(Japan)	**Daieishō**	K		(Japan)	**Hiradoumi**	10	-	5	-	0
4	-	11	-	0		(Japan)	Meisei	M1		(Japan)	Atamifuji	7	-	8	-	0
6	-	9	-	0		(Japan)	Wakamotoharu	M2		(Japan)	Mitakeumi	7	-	8	-	0
0	-	2	-	13	ø	(Japan)	Takayasu	M3		(Japan)	Gōnoyama	5	-	10	-	0
9	-	6	-	0		(Japan)	**Tobizaru**	M4		(Japan)	Ura	6	-	9	-	0
0	-	4	-	11	ø	(Japan)	Ōnoshō	M5		(Japan)	Shōnannoumi	7	-	8	-	0
12	-	3	-	0		(Japan)	**Takanoshō**	M6		(Japan)	**Ōhō**	9	-	6	-	0
8	-	7	-	0		(Japan)	**Kotoshōhō**	M7		(Japan)	Sadanoumi	5	-	10	-	0
3	-	12	-	0		(Japan)	Ryūden	M8		(Kazakhstan)	Kinbōzan	4	-	11	-	0
7	-	8	-	0		(Mongolia)	Ōshōma	M9		(Mongolia)	Tamawashi	7	-	8	-	0
10	-	5	-	0		(Japan)	**Shōdai**	M10		(Japan)	**Midorifuji**	8	-	7	-	0
8	-	7	-	0		(Japan)	**Ichiyamamoto**	M11		(Japan)	Nishikigi	5	-	10	-	0
3	-	2	-	10	ø	(Japan)	Asanoyama	M12		(Japan)	**Churanoumi**	10	-	5	-	0
6	-	9	-	0		(Japan)	Hokutofuji	M13		(Japan)	Takarafuji	5	-	10	-	0
11	-	4	-	0		(Japan)	**Wakatakakage**	M14		(Japan)	**Endō**	10	-	5	-	0
5	-	5	-	5		(Mongolia)	Chiyoshōma	M15		(Russia)	**Rōga**	9	-	6	-	0
9	-	6	-	0		(Japan)	**Kagayaki**	M16		(Japan)	**Bushōzan**	8	-	7	-	0
6	-	9	-	0		(Japan)	Nishikifuji	M17	ø			0	-	0	-	0

ø - Indicates a pull-out or absent rank
**winning record in bold**
**Yūshō Winner**
***Won Playoff**

=== September ===
Aki basho

Ryōgoku Kokugikan, Tokyo, 8 September – 22 September

2024 Aki basho results - Makuuchi Division
W		L		A	East			Rank	West			W		L		A
0	-	0	-	15	ø	(Mongolia)	Terunofuji	Y	ø			0	-	0	-	0
8	-	7	-	0		(Japan)	**Kotozakura**	O		(Mongolia)	**Hōshōryū**	8	-	7	-	0
5	-	10	-	0		(Japan)	Abi	S		(Japan)	**Ōnosato**	13	-	2	-	0
12	-	3	-	0		(Mongolia)	**Kirishima**	S	ø	(Japan)	Takakeishō	0	-	3	-	10
8	-	7	-	0		(Japan)	**Daieishō**	K		(Japan)	Hiradoumi	7	-	8	-	0
4	-	11	-	0		(Japan)	Takanoshō	M1		(Japan)	Tobizaru	5	-	10	-	0
7	-	8	-	0		(Japan)	Atamifuji	M2		(Japan)	**Ōhō**	9	-	6	-	0
4	-	11	-	0		(Japan)	Mitakeumi	M3		(Japan)	**Wakamotoharu**	11	-	4	-	0
10	-	5	-	0		(Japan)	**Shōdai**	M4		(Japan)	Kotoshōhō	7	-	8	-	0
9	-	6	-	0		(Japan)	**Ura**	M5		(Japan)	Shōnannoumi	3	-	12	-	0
5	-	10	-	0		(Japan)	Meisei	M6		(Japan)	Gōnoyama	6	-	9	-	0
12	-	3	-	0		(Japan)	**Wakatakakage**	M7		(Japan)	**Churanoumi**	10	-	5	-	0
8	-	7	-	0		(Japan)	**Endō**	M8		(Japan)	Midorifuji	7	-	8	-	0
7	-	8	-	0		(Japan)	Ichiyamamoto	M9		(Mongolia)	**Ōshōma**	10	-	5	-	0
7	-	8	-	0		(Mongolia)	Tamawashi	M10		(Russia)	**Rōga**	8	-	7	-	0
7	-	8	-	0		(Japan)	Sadanoumi	M11		(Japan)	Kagayaki	3	-	12	-	0
4	-	11	-	0		(Japan)	Bushōzan	M12		(Kazakhstan)	Kinbōzan	4	-	11	-	0
8	-	5	-	2		(Japan)	**Hokutofuji**	M13		(Japan)	**Nishikigi**	11	-	4	-	0
8	-	7	-	0		(Japan)	**Ryūden**	M14		(Mongolia)	Ōnokatsu	7	-	8	-	0
10	-	5	-	0		(Japan)	**Takayasu**	M15		(Japan)	**Takarafuji**	10	-	5	-	0
4	-	9	-	2		(Japan)	Shirokuma	M16		(Japan)	Kitanowaka	6	-	9	-	0
8	-	7	-	0		(Japan)	**Nishikifuji**	M17	ø			0	-	0	-	0

ø - Indicates a pull-out or absent rank
**winning record in bold**
**Yūshō Winner**

=== November ===
Kyushu basho

Fukuoka Kokusai Center, Kyushu, 10 November – 24 November

2024 Kyushu basho results - Makuuchi Division
W		L		A	East			Rank	West			W		L		A
0	-	0	-	15	ø	(Mongolia)	Terunofuji	Y	ø			0	-	0	-	0
14	-	1	-	0		(Japan)	**Kotozakura**	O		(Mongolia)	**Hōshōryū**	13	-	2	-	0
0	-	0	-	0	ø			O		(Japan)	**Ōnosato**	9	-	6	-	0
6	-	9	-	0		(Mongolia)	Kirishima	S		(Japan)	**Daieishō**	8	-	7	-	0
10	-	5	-	0		(Japan)	**Wakamotoharu**	K		(Japan)	Shōdai	4	-	11	-	0
6	-	9	-	0		(Japan)	Ōhō	M1		(Japan)	Hiradoumi	4	-	11	-	0
10	-	5	-	0		(Japan)	**Wakatakakage**	M2		(Japan)	Ura	5	-	10	-	0
11	-	4	-	0		(Japan)	**Abi**	M3		(Japan)	**Atamifuji**	8	-	7	-	0
4	-	11	-	0		(Japan)	Churanoumi	M4		(Mongolia)	Ōshōma	4	-	11	-	0
9	-	6	-	0		(Japan)	**Tobizaru**	M5	ø	(Japan)	Kotoshōhō	3	-	11	-	1
11	-	4	-	0		(Japan)	**Takanoshō**	M6		(Japan)	Nishikigi	5	-	10	-	0
7	-	8	-	0		(Japan)	Endō	M7		(Japan)	Mitakeumi	7	-	8	-	0
7	-	8	-	0		(Russia)	Rōga	M8		(Japan)	**Gōnoyama**	11	-	4	-	0
7	-	8	-	0		(Japan)	Midorifuji	M9		(Japan)	**Takayasu**	8	-	7	-	0
8	-	7	-	0		(Japan)	**Ichiyamamoto**	M10		(Japan)	**Takarafuji**	8	-	7	-	0
8	-	7	-	0		(Mongolia)	**Tamawashi**	M11		(Japan)	**Meisei**	8	-	7	-	0
7	-	8	-	0		(Japan)	Hokutofuji	M12		(Japan)	Sadanoumi	4	-	11	-	0
4	-	11	-	0		(Japan)	Ryūden	M13		(Japan)	**Shōnannoumi**	8	-	7	-	0
11	-	4	-	0		(Mongolia)	**Chiyoshōma**	M14		(Japan)	Nishikifuji	6	-	9	-	0
9	-	6	-	0		(Mongolia)	**Ōnokatsu**	M15		(Japan)	Tokihayate	6	-	9	-	0
5	-	10	-	0		(Ukraine)	Shishi	M16		(Japan)	**Takerufuji**	10	-	5	-	0
6	-	9	-	0		(Japan)	Asakōryū	M17	ø	(Japan)	Bushōzan	3	-	8	-	4

ø - Indicates a pull-out or absent rank
**winning record in bold**
**Yūshō Winner**

== News ==
=== January ===
- 16: Komusubi and former ōzeki Takayasu withdraws on Day 3 of the January 2024 tournament due to lower back pain. He returned on Day 6, but would withdraw again on Day 8 after coming down with the flu.
- 17: Ōzeki Takakeishō withdraws on Day 4 of the January 2024 tournament, citing a pinched nerve. His stablemaster later informs reporters that there are no plans for Takakeishō to re-enter the tournament.
- 19: Maegashira Hokuseihō withdraws from the January 2024 tournament after winning two matches in the first five days. The following day he announces that he will undergo surgery next month because of a meniscus injury in his right knee.
- 20: Bulgarian maegashira and former sekiwake Aoiyama, who was defeated in his first six matches at the January 2024 tournament, announces his withdrawal on Day 7 due to a suspected injury to his right ACL.
- 22: The January tournament loses two more makuuchi competitors with the Day 9 withdrawals of former ōzeki Asanoyama and former komusubi Hokutofuji. On the previous day, Asanoyama—who had been the sole tournament leader—appeared to twist his right knee in his loss to Tamawashi, while Hokutofuji landed awkwardly at the end of his match against Hōshōryū and suffered a right knee contusion. Takasago immediately indicated that Asanoyama's ankle was swollen and opened the possibility that he could return to the tournament. Asanoyama did indeed return to the tournament on Day 13 (26 January), securing an eighth win over Gōnoyama that day.
- 26: The Japan Sumo Association announces that the election of directors and deputy directors for the new two-year term at the head of the organization will not be subject to a vote, as the number of candidates matches the number of positions up for election. It has also been announced that the exact occupancy of the positions will be revealed after the March tournament.
- 27: Yokozuna Terunofuji gets a day of rest on the second to last day of the January tournament after his ōzeki opponent, Hōshōryū, withdraws due to a knee ligament injury. A Day 15 showdown for the Emperor's Cup is set between the yokozuna and two others: the last ōzeki remaining in the tournament, Kirishima, and aspiring ōzeki candidate Kotonowaka.
  The jūryō division title is decided on Day 14, with newly promoted Takerufuji securing a 2-win margin over his opponents for his third championship since debuting at the end of 2022.
- 28: Terunofuji (13–2), fully completing just his second tournament since finishing as the runner-up in July 2022, wins his ninth Emperor's Cup with a playoff victory over Kotonowaka (13–2). In their regularly scheduled Day 15 match, Kotonowaka won against Tobizaru to eliminate ōzeki and yokozuna contender Kirishima from the title picture. Terunofuji then dispatched Kirishima (11–4) to notch his 11th win in 11 matches against his fellow Mongolian. This set up the playoff in which Terunofuji, having defeated Kotonowaka two days earlier, beat the sekiwake by force out. All three of the special prizes are awarded at this tournament. The Shukun-shō (Outstanding Performance award) is given to Wakamotoharu (10–5), who defeated several top-ranked opponents including Terunofuji in his san'yaku return. New makuuchi competitor Ōnosato (11–4) receives the Kantō-shō (Fighting Spirit prize), and Kotonowaka receives the Ginō-shō for using a variety of winning sumo techniques.
  While Kotonowaka lost out on the makuuchi championship, the win in his scheduled Day 15 match gave him a total of 33 wins in the last three tournaments at the san'yaku ranks, which is the de facto standard to earn promotion to sumo's second-highest rank of ōzeki. The promotion is expected to be finalized on 31 January; coincidentally, it is Kotonowaka's father Sadogatake (former Kotonowaka Terumasa) who makes the formal promotion recommendation to the Sumo Association as head of the judging department. It is also expected that the new ōzeki will keep his shikona (ring name) for a while to honor his father, whose highest rank in competition was sekiwake, before adopting the name of his late yokozuna grandfather Kotozakura.
- 31: The Sumo Association approves the promotion of Kotonowaka to the rank of ōzeki. He becomes the first ōzeki from Chiba Prefecture since the promotion of Matsunobori after the Autumn tournament in 1955. In his acceptance speech, Kotonowaka says: "With a feeling of gratitude I will devote myself to the way of sumo in order to live up to the title of ōzeki." He also confirmed that he will keep his current name of Kotonowaka for the next tournament in March, before changing his shikona to Kotozakura in May.
  The Sumo Association announces that four wrestlers are promoted again to the second-highest rank of jūryō. One of the wrestlers is former sekiwake Wakatakakage. The younger brother of Wakamotoharu, Wakatakakage returns to sekitori status after clinching the January 2024 championship in makushita with a perfect record of 7 wins. His last competition in the top division was in March 2023 at sekiwake, when a late ACL and meniscus injury forced him to withdraw; he subsequently dropped down the rankings until his return in November. Another wrestler returning to sekitori status is 20-year-old former maegashira Hakuōhō, who challenged for the top-division championship in only his fourth professional tournament in July 2023 before taking off the remainder of the year due to a shoulder injury. In his return tournament in January, Hakuōhō finished behind Wakatakakage in the makushita division with 6 wins. 30-year-old Tsushimanada returns to sumo's second-highest division after three tournaments, while 37-year-old Kitaharima, a one-time maegashira competitor with a 22-year history in professional sumo, returns to jūryō for the first time in 4 1/2 years.

=== February ===
- 1: The Japan Sumo Association donates ¥10 million to Ishikawa Prefecture after the effects of the 2024 Noto earthquake. Additionally, ¥5 million collected from spectators at the January tournament in Tokyo is also donated.
- 4: The retirement ceremony for former ōzeki Tochinoshin is held at the Ryōgoku Kokugikan.
- 11: The 48th Japan Grand Sumo Tournament, a one-day competition for professional sumo wrestlers, is held at the Ryōgoku Kokugikan. The winner is Hōshōryū, with the ōzeki defeating such opponents as Abi and Takayasu before winning the championship match against Hiradoumi.
  At the same time, the first edition of the Dream Girls Cup, a sumo competition open to girls from the first year of elementary school to the third year of secondary school, is held at the Sumida City Gymnasium, with around 200 participants and the patronage of former yokozuna Hakuhō.
  The retirement ceremony for former sekiwake Ichinojō is held in a Tokyo hotel.
- 21: After Hokuseihō's withdrawal from the January tournament, it is announced by the Sumo Association that Hokuseihō assaulted several stablemates, and that an investigation had been launched after one of them made a formal complaint. Summoned to inform him that disciplinary proceedings had been launched against both him and his stablemaster Miyagino, Hokuseihō simply told the press that he was "honestly remorseful". The Sumo Association is expected to hold a board meeting on 23 February, with news reports suggesting that the board will discuss a recommendation for Hokuseihō to retire and demote Miyagino in sumo's hierarchy.
- 22: Hokuseihō submits his retirement notification the day before the full Sumo Association board is scheduled to meet to discuss his actions.
- 23: At an extraordinary board meeting of the Sumo Association, Hokuseihō's retirement is accepted before the board can issue a formal recommendation. Stablemaster Miyagino (the former Hakuhō) is demoted from iin (committee member) to the lowest ranking of toshiyori (elder) and receives a salary cut of 20 percent for three months. The board also takes actions that effectively relieve him of his duties as stablemaster for the time being, announcing that members of the Isegahama ichimon will oversee the Miyagino stable wrestlers for an unspecified amount of time.
  Former komusubi Hōmashō inherits Shikoroyama stable after the death of the previous stablemaster (former sekiwake Terao).
- 26: The Sumo Association releases the banzuke for the spring grand sumo tournament in Osaka, the haru basho. The tournament will feature four faces at the second-highest rank of ōzeki, with newly promoted Kotonowaka joining Hōshōryū, Kirishima and demotion-threatened Takakeishō. The other two of the san'yaku ranks see three returning rikishi, all of whom had recently been demoted from that group. Wakamotoharu, who put in a 10-win performance with a gold star as the top rank-and-filer in January, returns to the sekiwake rank. Abi, who had just been demoted from komusubi, and Nishikigi, who was demoted from komusubi after the September 2023 tournament, both return to that rank after securing 8-win records in January. At the top of the maegashira ranks is former ōzeki Asanoyama, who secures a personal best on the banzuke since his return from suspension in July 2022. A new competitor in the maegashira ranks is 24-year-old Takerufuji. The Kanagi, Aomori native made his maezumo debut in September 2022 and has three lower-division titles under his belt: his first two competitive tournaments, and the jūryō championship at the most recent tournament in January. Four other wrestlers see a return to the top makuuchi division: Nishikifuji, Kitanowaka and Rōga all return after having just been demoted, while Daiamami returns for the first time since July 2022.
  It is reported that starting with the March 2024 tournament, the Sumo Association will have emergency medical technicians permanently stationed near the dohyō. The measures build on first aid procedures that were strengthened after the death of Hibikiryu, who struck his head on the floor of the dohyō in a bout during the March 2021 tournament and died the following month.
  Tamagaki (former komusubi Tomonohana), a coach at Ōshima stable, is appointed acting master of Miyagino stable for the March 2024 tournament in the place of the former Hakuhō.

=== March ===
- 13: Maegashira Shimazuumi withdraws on Day 4 of the March tournament after being diagnosed with a tear in a part of his left calf requiring about three weeks of treatment.
- 14: Two more maegashira withdraw on Day 5 after suffering injuries the day before. Tsurugishō is expected to miss about two months after he reinjured his left knee in his Day 4 bout and was taken away from the dohyō in a wheelchair. Kinbōzan pulls out with a neck sprain and was expected to miss seven days, but returns to competition after just three days of rest.
- 16: Yokozuna Terunofuji withdraws after losing four matches in the first six days, including three straight gold stars conceded to maegashira competitors. It is his ninth withdrawal from a grand sumo tournament since being elevated to yokozuna in October 2021.
- 18: Former maegashira Terutsuyoshi retires, ending a 14-year career limited by his battle with diabetes.
- 19: It is announced that current maegashira and former sekiwake Tamawashi has officially acquired Japanese citizenship, which is required for foreign sumo wrestlers to remain in the Sumo Association as a coach upon retirement.
  Maegashira Tobizaru withdraws on Day 10 of the March tournament due to symptoms of enteritis, though his stablemaster Oitekaze says that he should return to competition the following day.
- 20: Maegashira Takerufuji ties the professional sumo record of 11 wins in the first 11 days by a newly promoted top division wrestler set in January 1960 by Taihō.
- 23: Prior to the start of the Day 14 matches, Takakeishō–who secured eight wins and thereby escaped demotion from the ōzeki rank again–withdraws from competition after suffering a pectoral muscle injury in his win over fellow ōzeki Kotonowaka the day before.
- 24: Takerufuji (13–2) escapes an injury withdrawal scenario and shows up to the Osaka Prefectural Gymnasium on the last day of the March tournament to defeat Gōnoyama (10–5), becoming the first newly promoted makuuchi competitor since Ryōgoku II in 1914 to win the top division championship. He also becomes the fastest competitor to win their first Emperor's Cup since the introduction of the six-tournament system in 1958. Takerufuji had been diagnosed with a ligament injury in his right ankle following his loss to Asanoyama the day before. Despite the suggestion from his stablemaster Isegahama (the 63rd yokozuna Asahifuji) to withdraw, he says that he would have regretted it for the rest of his life if he did. Takerufuji is rewarded by the Sumo Association for his efforts with all three special prizes for outstanding performance, fighting spirit and technique, becoming the first to sweep the prizes since the former Kotomitsuki in November 2000. Two additional awards for fighting spirit and technique are awarded to amateur sumo champion Ōnosato (11–4), who was the runner-up for the majority of what is just his second tournament in the top division. Elsewhere in the top division, Asanoyama secures nine wins to likely ensure his return to the san'yaku ranks in May, while Kirishima faces kadoban status in the next tournament to keep his ōzeki rank after winning just five matches.
  Former maegashira Mitoryū (12–3) secures his second championship in jūryō and a likely return to the rank-and-file at the next tournament.
- 25: Elections for the board of directors of the Japan Sumo Association are held. The Dewanoumi ichimon secures the election of Dewanoumi, Kasugano and Sakaigawa when the second largest clan, the Nishonoseki ichimon, secures that of Shibatayama, Sadogatake and names for the first time Takadagawa at that rank. The Tokitsukaze ichimon appoints only two directors with Isenoumi and Katsunoura, who will serve his first term as director. The two smaller clans (Takasago and Isegahama) each nominate just one, with respectively Hakkaku (for the Takasago ichimon) and Asakayama (for the Isegahama ichimon), the latter also becoming director for the first time. It was also decided to reappoint Hakkaku to a fifth consecutive term as chairman of the association.
- 27: The Sumo Association announces promotions to the second-highest rank of jūryō, three of whom are promoted to sekitori status for the very first time. 24-year-old Kazekenō won the jonokuchi title in his first tournament in May 2022 and clinched the makushita championship at the recently concluded March tournament with a perfect record of seven wins. 23-year-old Mongolian Ōnokatsu entered professional sumo after winning the student yokozuna title while at Nippon Sport Science University, and debuted last November at makushita 15 under the former makushita tsukedashi system. 24-year-old Tsukahara has competed in professional sumo for 6 1/2 years with two lower-division championships; the junior high school yokozuna won several team championships at Saitama Sakae High School with classmates including Ōhō and Kotoshōhō. In the May 2024 tournament, Tsukahara will take the ring name Tochitaikai (栃大海). 17-year sumo veteran Chiyomaru, the January 2014 jūryō champion and former maegashira, returns to jūryō after he was demoted to makushita for the March tournament.
  At the Sumo Association's board meeting, Takekuma (former ōzeki Gōeidō) is appointed a member of the judging department and will serve as a ringside judge starting in the May tournament. It was previously reported that Otowayama (the 71st yokozuna Kakuryū) would also be joining the judging department.
- 28: In the aftermath of physical abuse at Miyagino stable from the former Hokuseihō and the subsequent demotion in sumo's hierarchy of its stablemaster, the 69th yokozuna Hakuhō, the Sumo Association announces the closure of Miyagino stable for the foreseeable future and the transfer of wrestlers and coaches to Isegahama stable.
  Also approved by the Sumo Association is the closure of Michinoku stable on 2 April, and the transfer of those wrestlers to other stables within the Tokitsukaze ichimon. Among the transfers are current ōzeki Kirishima, who will move to the former Kakuryū's Otowayama stable. Michinoku's stablemaster, former ōzeki Kirishima Kazuhiro, faces mandatory retirement from the Sumo Association on his 65th birthday on 3 April, but he will remain with the association in a consultant role.

=== April ===
- 8: The first training session is held at Isegahama stable following the move-in of personnel from Miyagino stable the previous day. Isegahama now has a total of about 40 wrestlers, the largest among all professional sumo stables.
- 16: The Japan Sumo Association organizes its first charity sumo tournament (kanjin-sumo) in 62 years to raise additional donations following the 2024 Noto earthquake.
- 17: The Sumo Association announces the retirement of Furiwake (former maegashira Sadanofuji) as a sumo elder. He had served as a coach at Sakaigawa stable upon concluding his competitive sumo career in 2017.
- 19: The Sumo Association reintroduces athletics tests to judge the admission of new recruits for the first time in 12 years, since the abolition of the height and weight prerequisite system at the end of 2023. The test is based on seven physical tests (back strength, grip strength, repeated horizontal jump, handball throw, handstand, standing long jump and 50-meter run). Thanks to the new physical prerequisites, the test saw the recruitment of the first wrestler under 1.60 m (5 ft 3 in) since the post-war era, Kōsei Motomura–1.59 m (5 ft 2 1/2 in)–who joined Sadogatake stable.
- 22: Ōnosato is issued a strict warning by the Sumo Association along with his stablemaster Nishonoseki, after Nishonoseki reported that Ōnosato had been drinking with an underage wrestler in his stable back in September 2023.
- 30: The Sumo Association publishes the banzuke for the May grand sumo tournament in Tokyo, also known as the natsu basho. At the second-highest rank of ōzeki, Kotonowaka officially becomes Kotozakura after taking the ring name used by his late grandfather, the 53rd yokozuna Kotozakura Masakatsu. The sekiwake rank sees the return of Abi for the first time in two years. Former ōzeki Asanoyama, who suffered a knee injury near the end of the spring regional tour a few days prior, is promoted to the rank of komusubi. This marks Asanoyama's return to san'yaku for the first time since his return from suspension in July 2022. Joining him at that rank for the first time is 23-year-old Ōnosato, who reaches san'yaku in his seventh professional tournament. The March tournament champion, Takerufuji, is promoted to maegashira 6 for his efforts. Entering the top division for the first time are two competitors. One is 27-year-old Mongolian Ōshōma, who entered professional sumo in November 2021 after winning several amateur titles and has won championships in jūryō and makushita. The other is 27-year-old Tokihayate, a five-year professional competitor with two lower-division championships. Three others return to the rank-and-file: Mitoryū returns for the first time in one year, while both Tomokaze and Takarafuji return after having just been demoted. Two veteran makuuchi competitors drop down to jūryō: Myōgiryū falls from the top division after almost 6 1/2 years, while Endō drops down for the first time in just over eight years. It also marks Endō's fifth professional tournament outside of makuuchi in his 11-year career.

The spring jungyō (regional tours) were held at the following locations:

- 31 March: Ise Shrine, Mie (Ceremonial tournament)
- 1: Minoh, Osaka
- 2: Shin'onsen, Hyōgo
- 3: Ichinomiya, Aichi
- 4: Inuyama, Aichi
- 5: Fukui
- 7: Toyama
- 11: Gotemba, Shizuoka
- 12: Kawagoe, Saitama
- 13: Fujisawa, Kanagawa
- 14: Saitama
- 15: Yasukuni Shrine, Tokyo (Ceremonial tournament)
- 16: Machida, Tokyo
- 18: Urayasu, Chiba
- 19: Kawasaki, Kanagawa
- 20: Yokohama, Kanagawa
- 21: Maebashi, Gunma
- 25: Kisarazu, Chiba
- 26: Mito, Ibaraki
- 27: Tokorozawa, Saitama
- 28: Fukaya, Saitama

=== May ===
- 1: Following the abuse case and the retirement of Hokuseihō, the Japan Sumo Association summons the rikishi-kai and holds a conference on the problems of violence in the stables.
  Following the charity tournament (kanjin-sumo) held on 16 April, the Sumo Association donates ¥27 million to Ishikawa Prefecture to support reconstruction efforts after the 2024 Noto earthquake.
- 8: Despite returning to san'yaku status for the first time in three years, it is announced that Asanoyama will withdraw from the upcoming May tournament as he continues recovering from a knee injury suffered near the end of the spring regional tour.
  It is announced that Oguruma (former ōzeki Kotokaze) decides not to make use of his full period of re-employment and will retire for good at the age of 67. The Sumo Association makes his retirement official three days later. He entrusts the management of the elder share Oguruma to his original stable, Sadogatake stable.
- 9: Maegashira Takerufuji decides not to take part in the May tournament in order to heal his injured ankle.
- 12: The opening day of the May 2024 tournament is marked by numerous upsets of top-ranked wrestlers. The only competitor ranked above maegashira to win their match is new komusubi Ōnosato, who defeats yokozuna Terunofuji. It is the first time since the Shōwa era that all yokozuna and ōzeki competitors are defeated on the first tournament day, as well as the first time since September 2006 that yokozuna and ōzeki wrestlers have lost on the same day in a tournament with at least five such competitors combined.
- 13: Yokozuna Terunofuji and ōzeki Takakeishō both withdraw from the May tournament due to injuries, after suffering defeats on the opening day.
- 14: Maegashira and former ōzeki Takayasu withdraws from the May tournament on Day 3 after injuring his back during morning practice. He returns on Day 9, defeating ōzeki Hōshōryū.
- 17: Former maegashira Kotoekō decides to retire, ending a 17-year professional sumo career. He plans to take the Oguruma elder name most recently held by former ōzeki Kotokaze.
- 18: Two other top-ranked wrestlers, sekiwake Wakamotoharu and ōzeki Kirishima, withdraw from the May tournament. Kirishima, as a kadoban ōzeki, faces demotion to sekiwake and will have to win ten matches in July to return to sumo's second-highest rank. Wakamotoharu does not rule out returning to the competition, and returns on Day 11.
- 19: In an editorial published in Sports Hochi, former ōzeki Kotokaze advocates for a return to non-impact breaks for the ranking in the event of injury. The plea follows the absence of five of the nine wrestlers making up the san'yaku ranks, a first since the 2018 November tournament.
- 22: Maegashira Mitoryū withdraws on Day 11 of the May 2024 tournament due to osteoarthritis in both of his knees.
  It is announced that Mongolian former maegashira Chiyoshōma acquires Japanese citizenship, which is required to remain in the Sumo Association as a coach upon retirement.
- 26: Komusubi Ōnosato (12–3) wins the May top-division championship. He breaks the record recently set by March tournament champion Takerufuji as the fastest wrestler to win their first Emperor's Cup since their debut in the history of professional sumo, doing so in seven tournaments, and also becomes the first wrestler since the late Haguroyama in 1957 to win a top-division championship immediately after promotion to komusubi. Ōnosato entered the final day of the tournament as the sole leader, with four others one win behind at the time: ōzeki Kotozakura (11–4) and Hōshōryū (10–5), sekiwake Abi (10–5), and top maegashira Daieishō (11–4). A loss by Ōnosato to Abi would have forced a playoff. However, the 23-year-old Ōnosato quickly dispatches his opponent in the tournament's penultimate match by spinning him to the side and pushing him out. Ōnosato receives the Outstanding Performance prize and his second straight Technique prize for his efforts, becoming the first wrestler in 25 years to win a special prize in each of their first three top-division tournaments. Mongolian Ōshōma (10–5) wins the Fighting Spirit prize in his top-division debut.
  The jūryō division is won by former sekiwake Wakatakakage (14–1), the younger brother of current sekiwake Wakamotoharu.
- 29: The Sumo Association holds their ranking meeting, and announces three promotions to the jūryō division for July. One of the two new promotions to sekitori status is 24-year-old Okinawa native Kayō, a graduate of Nippon Sport Science University who entered professional sumo in May 2022 as a sandanme tsukedashi competitor. The other new sekitori is 22-year-old Nabatame, who entered the professional sumo world at the beginning of 2020 and becomes the second salaried wrestler for Futagoyama stable. Returning to jūryō after one year is 26-year-old Fujiseiun. The Fujishima stable competitor has won a total of four lower-division championships, including two this year after returning from injury.
  Among the 13 retirements announced by the Sumo Association, besides Kotoekō, are four lower-division wrestlers originally from Miyagino stable. The four had all been transferred to Isegahama stable following Miyagino's temporary closure earlier in the year.
- 30: The Sumo Association approves the request of Nakamura (former sekiwake Yoshikaze) to branch off from Nishonoseki stable and create his own stable. Wrestlers transferring to the new Nakamura stable include maegashira Tomokaze, who followed Yoshikaze from the former Oguruma stable, and recent jūryō promotion Kayō.

=== June ===
- 1: The retirement ceremony for former maegashira Ishiura is held at the Ryōgoku Kokugikan.
- 2: The retirement ceremony for former maegashira Akiseyama is held at the Ryōgoku Kokugikan.
- 8: The retirement ceremony for former maegashira Chiyonokuni is held at the Ryōgoku Kokugikan.
- 23: The retirement ceremony for former maegashira Terutsuyoshi is held at the Ryōgoku Kokugikan.
- 30: 67-year-old Minatogawa (former komusubi Daitetsu) retires early from his consultant role with the Sumo Association.

=== July ===
- 1: The Sumo Association releases the banzuke for the July grand sumo tournament, which is scheduled to be the final Nagoya tournament held in the current Aichi Prefectural Gymnasium (Dolphins Arena) before it moves to the new Aichi International Arena in 2025. The rankings see the demotion of Kirishima from ōzeki to sekiwake after consecutive losing tournaments. The Mongolian will need a 10-win record to restore his ōzeki status. Meanwhile, Takakeishō once again finds himself needing a winning record to keep his ōzeki rank. May's top division champion Ōnosato is promoted to sekiwake for his eighth professional sumo tournament. At the komusubi ranks are May runner-up Daieishō, returning to san'yaku after he was just demoted to the top maegashira rank, and Hiradoumi, who moves up to san'yaku for the first time in his eight-year career. May's jūryō champion Wakatakakage returns to the top division for the first time since being relegated while recovering from an ACL injury. He joins his older brother Wakamotoharu, marking the first tournament in one year that the two are listed together in the top division rankings. Four others return to the top division: Former komusubi Endō returns after having just been demoted in May, Bushōzan returns after two tournaments, and both Chiyoshōma and Kagayaki return after four tournaments. Of the wrestlers that are relegated, former ōzeki Asanoyama drops from komusubi to maegashira 12, and March's top division champion Takerufuji falls from maegashira 6 to jūryō 2. Neither competed in the May tournament due to injury.
- 12: Before the opening day matches are decided for the July tournament, it is announced that maegashira Chiyoshōma has withdrawn from the competition. It is later reported that the Mongolian underwent surgery to repair a herniated disc on 28 June. March's top-division champion Takerufuji also withdraws from the jūryō competition. Both wrestlers return on Day 6 and Day 8, respectively.
- 15: Maegashira and former ōzeki Takayasu withdraws on Day 2 of the July tournament. He was seen clutching his chest after losing to sekiwake Kirishima in his opening day contest, and was later diagnosed with a partial tear of his left pectoral muscle.
- 17: After losing his first three matches, maegashira and former komusubi Ōnoshō withdraws on Day 4 of the July tournament. His medical certificate with the Sumo Association indicated right ankle arthritis and ligament damage in his right knee.
- 18: Maegashira Asanoyama withdraws on Day 5 of the July tournament. The former ōzeki, who made his way back up to the top division in May 2023 following a one-year suspension from the ring for violating COVID-19 protocols, injured his left ACL in his Day 4 contest against Ichiyamamoto. His medical certificate said that the injury would need about two months of treatment, but stablemaster Takasago said it could take more than six months for Asanoyama to fully recover and return to competition.
- 28: Yokozuna Terunofuji wins a playoff over maegashira Takanoshō to secure his tenth top-division championship at the July 2024 tournament. Having taken the sole lead and built a two-win advantage during the tournament, Terunofuji faltered in his last two regularly scheduled matches. One of those losses came on Day 14 against Takanoshō, who notched his third kinboshi over the yokozuna. With both of their records level at 12–3 after their Day 15 matches, Terunofuji wins the playoff by slipping free from Takanoshō's grasp and driving him out of the ring. Takanoshō receives one of the three special prizes, the Fighting Spirit prize, for his efforts. New komusubi Hiradoumi (10–5) gets his first career special prize, receiving the Technique prize. The Outstanding Performance prize goes to new sekiwake Ōnosato (9–6), who defeated Terunofuji on Day 11 and becomes the first wrestler to receive one of the three special prizes in his first four top-division tournaments.
  The championship in the jūryō division goes to 25-year-old Shirokuma (12–3), who won his final contest to avoid a three-way playoff for the title.
- 31: Three promotions to the jūryō division are announced by the Sumo Association after their ranking meeting, including two who enter salaried status for the first time. One is 21-year-old Kiryūkō, who enters after three years of professional sumo and one makushita title. Kiryūkō's father is former maegashira Tokitsuumi, who was the former head of Tokitsukaze stable until his departure from the Sumo Association in early 2021. The other new promotion is 24-year-old Daiseizan from China. He entered professional sumo in 2021 at the urging of his stablemaster, former maegashira Sōkokurai, and was the makushita champion at the recently concluded July tournament. 23-year-old Ōshōumi, who won five matches in July after he had just been demoted to makushita, returns to jūryō.

=== August ===
- 1: The Sumo Association announces that Yūji Horasawa (san'yaku-gyōji, the 3rd Kimura Yōdō) will be promoted to the rank of tate-gyōji and become the 42nd Shikimori Inosuke. The promotion takes effect on 26 August, when the rankings for the September tournament are published. It will mark the first time since 2015 that both of the tate-gyōji ranks are occupied.
- 26: The Sumo Association releases the banzuke for the September grand sumo tournament in Tokyo. Compared with the previous rankings there are no changes to the san'yaku division with the exception of Takakeishō, who drops from ōzeki to sekiwake and needs ten victories at the tournament to return to his former rank. In the maegashira ranks there are two new competitors. The first is 24-year-old Mongolian Ōnokatsu. A member of Ōnomatsu stable who entered professional sumo last November at the rank of makushita 15, Ōnokatsu has notched winning records in all of his tournaments, including 22 wins in his last two tournaments at jūryō. He is the last wrestler to be ranked at makushita 15 prior to the revision of the tsukedashi system at the end of 2023. The other new promotion is 25-year-old Shirokuma, a graduate of Nippon Sport Science University who was recruited by the 72nd yokozuna Kisenosato. Shirokuma has won three championships: the jonokuchi and jonidan championships upon his debut in 2022, and the jūryō title at the recently concluded July tournament. Kitanowaka returns to the top division for the third time in his career, having spent the last two tournaments in jūryō.

The summer jungyō (regional tours) were held at the following locations:

- 4: Saku, Nagano
- 5: Tonami, Toyama
- 6: Gifu
- 7: Fujieda, Shizuoka
- 8: Tachikawa, Tokyo
- 9: Hitachi, Ibaraki
- 10: Iwaki, Fukushima
- 11: Obanazawa, Yamagata
- 12-13: Sendai
- 14: Hanamaki, Iwate
- 15: Aomori
- 17-18: Sapporo
- 21: Tsugaru, Aomori
- 22: Fukushima
- 23: Ōta, Tokyo
- 24: Zama, Kanagawa
- 25: Yokosuka, Kanagawa

=== September ===
- 6: Yokozuna Terunofuji pulls out prior to the start of the September tournament, marking his eleventh absence in 19 tournaments at sumo's highest rank. He had told reporters at the end of the summer regional tours that he had lost about 10 kilograms of weight, and was seen performing only limited sumo exercises in an open practice at Isegahama stable on 4 September.
- 10: Mongolian maegashira and former sekiwake Tamawashi wins in his 1,631st consecutive match, which sets the all-time professional sumo record for most consecutive match appearances. The record was previously held by Shiranui (former sekiwake Aobajō), who participated in 1,630 consecutive matches from 1964 until 1986. The Sumo Association officially recognizes Tamawashi's record despite his forced withdrawal from competition in 2022 due to COVID-19 protocols at the time.
  Sekiwake Takakeishō, who had just been demoted from the rank of ōzeki, withdraws from the September tournament after suffering consecutive defeats in his first two matches.
- 20: The Japan Sumo Association announces Takakeishō's retirement from active competition. He tells reporters at a press conference the following day that he is "burned out" after running out of physical and mental energy to pursue promotion to yokozuna. At 28 years of age, he is the second-youngest wrestler since 1925 to retire from professional sumo after reaching the rank of ōzeki. He will remain with the Sumo Association as a coach, taking on the elder name of Minatogawa.
- 21: Sekiwake Ōnosato defeats ōzeki Hōshōryū on Day 14 of the September 2024 tournament to clinch his second top-division championship. It is his second Emperor's Cup in three tournaments, having also won the makuuchi title in May. With his 13th win of the tournament, he also meets the de facto requirement for promotion to ōzeki of 33 wins across three tournaments at the san'yaku ranks.
  The championship in jūryō is also decided on Day 14, with the title going to former maegashira Takerufuji. It is his third sumo championship of the year, having won the jūryō title in January and the top-division championship in March.
- 22: As the September 2024 tournament draws to a close, top-division champion Ōnosato (13–2) receives two of the three special prizes, the Fighting Spirit prize and the Technique prize, for the third time in his career. He becomes the first sumo wrestler ever to win a special prize in five consecutive tournaments. Runner-up Wakatakakage (12–3) receives his first Outstanding Performance prize, while Nishikigi (11–4) receives his first Fighting Spirit prize.
  The judging department officially requests Ōnosato's promotion to the rank of ōzeki, which is expected to be considered and approved at a meeting of the Sumo Association's full board on 25 September.
  The 38th Kimura Shōnosuke (Hideki Imaoka) retires after officiating the final match of the September 2024 tournament, concluding his sumo career as a gyōji spanning almost five decades.
- 24: Two former sekiwake retire from professional sumo competition: Bulgarian Aoiyama and Hyōgo native Myōgiryū. Both will remain as coaches in the Sumo Association, taking the elder names Iwatomo and Furiwake, respectively.
- 25: The Sumo Association unanimously approves Ōnosato's promotion to the rank of ōzeki. The 24-year-old officially reaches sumo's second-highest rank in a record nine tournaments since debuting at makushita 10 in May 2023.
  A sumo wrestler from Ukraine is one of three new promotions by the Sumo Association to the second-highest jūryō division for the November 2024 tournament. 20-year-old Aonishiki, a third-place finisher in the 2019 World Junior Sumo Championships, moved to Japan in 2022 following the Russian invasion of Ukraine. In the six tournaments since his professional debut in November 2023 he has won two lower-division championships, with an overall record of 38 wins against just four losses. The other new jūryō promotions are 19-year-old Wakaikari, the eldest son of Kabutoyama (former maegashira Ōikari) with one lower-division title since debuting in March 2023, and 21-year-old Kototebakari, the younger brother of top-division wrestler Kotoshōhō who made his debut in March 2022 by winning two consecutive lower-division championships with perfect records. Upon the release of the November banzuke, Kototebakari changed his ring name to Kotoeihō. Three wrestlers will return to the jūryō division: Tochitaikai and Nabatame both return after having just been demoted, while 33-year-old former maegashira Chiyomaru returns to salaried status after two tournaments.
- 26: The Sumo Association approves the request of Hidenoyama (former ōzeki Kotoshōgiku) to branch off from Sadogatake stable for the purpose of forming his own stable. The new Hidenoyama stable will open on 19 October.
  The Sumo Association announces that Yūji Horasawa (tate-gyōji, the 42nd Shikimori Inosuke) will be promoted again this year and become the 39th Kimura Shōnosuke, the senior of the two tate-gyōji ranks. The title of Shikimori Inosuke will be given to Yoshimitsu Morita (san'yaku-gyōji, the 15th Kimura Shōtarō), who will be the 43rd person to hold the junior tate-gyōji name. Additionally, Hiroshi Kikuchi (the 12th Shikimori Kandayū) will be elevated to the rank of san'yaku-gyōji. All of these promotions will take effect on 23 December 2024, when the rankings for the January 2025 tournament are released.
- 28: The retirement ceremony for former maegashira Azumaryū is held at the Ryōgoku Kokugikan.
- 30: Ōzeki Kotozakura wins the 30th All Japan Grand Sumo Championship, an annual single-elimination tournament held at the Ryōgoku Kokugikan. He defeats the newly promoted Ōnosato in the final match.

=== October ===
- 28: The Sumo Association releases the banzuke for the November grand sumo tournament in Fukuoka, which marks the ōzeki debut of this year's May and September top-division champion Ōnosato. Daieishō receives a promotion to sekiwake for the first time in three tournaments. The komusubi ranks see the return of former ōzeki Shōdai, who returns to san'yaku after eight tournaments, and former sekiwake Wakamotoharu, who was last ranked above maegashira in May of this year. 27-year-old Shishi, who entered professional sumo in 2020, becomes the first Ukrainian-born wrestler to be promoted to the top division. The other wrestler making his debut in the rank-and-file is 26-year-old Asakōryū, an amateur sumo champion who won the sandanme title in his debut in May 2021. Three wrestlers return to the top division including Takerufuji, this year's March makuuchi champion and winner of the jūryō title at the most recent tournament in September. Tokihayate, who was first promoted to the top division in May of this year, returns after two tournaments in jūryō, while 33-year-old Chiyoshōma returns after having just been demoted.

The autumn jungyō (regional tours) were held at the following locations:

- 1: Adachi, Tokyo
- 2: Sagamihara
- 3: Kashiwa
- 4: Ashikaga, Tochigi
- 5: Sanjō, Niigata
- 6: Kanazawa
- 7: Takaoka, Toyama
- 8: Uozu, Toyama
- 9: Hikone, Shiga
- 10: Tōkai, Aichi
- 12: Shizuoka
- 13: Yoshida, Shizuoka
- 14: Tokoname, Aichi
- 16: Toyohashi
- 17: Kyoto
- 18: Kobe
- 19: Kadoma, Osaka
- 20: Wakayama
- 21: Naka, Tokushima
- 22: Saijō, Ehime
- 23: Marugame, Kagawa
- 24: Himeji
- 25: Okayama
- 26: Hiroshima
- 27: Kurashiki

=== November ===
- 2: The Sumo Association announces that tickets for all 90 grand tournament days in 2024 have sold out. It is the first complete sellout of all six sumo tournaments in one year since 1996.
- 8: Yokozuna Terunofuji pulls out of the November 2024 tournament. It is reported that Terunofuji continues to have health issues, and was unable to resume training when his stable arrived in Fukuoka late last month. This is Terunofuji's second consecutive tournament withdrawal, and his twelfth in the 20 tournaments since his yokozuna promotion in 2021.
- 16: Maegashira Bushōzan withdraws on Day 7 of the November tournament after appearing to injure his left knee in his Day 6 win over Nishikifuji. He returned on Day 12.
- 20: On the 11th day of the November tournament, Ura defeats Hiradoumi after two rematches. A rikishi fighting three matches in one day is extremely unusual.
- 23: Maegashira Kotoshōhō withdraws on Day 14 of the November tournament, with his medical certificate indicating a toe dislocation and avulsion fracture requiring two months of treatment.
- 24: The Emperor's Cup in the November 2024 tournament goes to ōzeki Kotozakura (14–1), who takes the first top-division title of his career and second championship overall. The son of former sekiwake Kotonowaka entered the final day tied with fellow ōzeki Hōshōryū (13–2), against whom he had 6 wins in their 18 career head-to-head matchups. In the final match of the tournament Kotozakura counters his opponent's initial charge and attempted overarm throw, slapping Hōshōryū down to the dohyō. Kotozakura wins his first makuuchi championship in his fifth tournament as an ōzeki–the same as his late grandfather, yokozuna Kotozakura I, who did so in July 1968. He also finishes 2024 with a division-leading 66 victories. Following the tournament the Sumo Association indicates that Kotozakura and Hōshōryū–who both had a two-win advantage over their nearest opponents entering the final day–will be candidates for yokozuna promotion at the next tournament in January 2025. The third ōzeki in the tournament, Ōnosato, secures nine wins in his debut at sumo's second-highest rank; he ends his first year in the top division with 65 wins, one behind Kotozakura. All three of the special prizes are awarded at the end of the tournament. Two go to wrestlers with 11–4 records: Abi receives his second Outstanding Performance prize and sixth special prize overall, while Takanoshō collects his fourth Fighting Spirit prize. Wakatakakage (10–5) collects his fifth Technique prize.
  Kinbōzan, who was just demoted to the jūryō division, clinches that championship and a likely return to makuuchi in January with a 12–3 record.
- 27: The Sumo Association announces that Hatsuyama will be newly promoted to the jūryō division for the January 2025 tournament. The 25-year-old graduate of Toyo University finished in the top eight in several amateur sumo tournaments, and entered professional sumo for Tamanoi stable as a sandanme tsukedashi competitor in March 2022. Additionally, Kiryūkō earns promotion to jūryō for the second time, after having been demoted to makushita at the recent November tournament.
- 29: The Sumo Association announces that it will hold a sumo exhibition in London in October 2025 amid growing interest in the sport by international tourists visiting Japan. It will be the first international trip sanctioned by the association in 20 years, the last being in 2005 in Las Vegas. London previously hosted a sumo exhibition in October 1991.

=== December ===
- 18: Former komusubi Ōnoshō retires from professional competition. The 28-year-old does not intend to remain with the Sumo Association.
- 23: The Sumo Association releases the banzuke for the first grand sumo tournament of 2025, to be held in January in Tokyo's Ryōgoku Kokugikan. The tournament will see two ōzeki, Kotozakura and Hōshōryū, vying for promotion to sumo's highest rank of yokozuna. After a 10-win performance at the last tournament in November, Wakamotoharu earns a return to sekiwake after three tournaments. His younger brother Wakatakakage, who also won ten matches in November, returns to komusubi for the first time since his 2023 knee injury and subsequent relegation; it marks the first time since the injury that the two brothers are ranked together in san'yaku. Abi is also promoted to komusubi, making an immediate return to the ranks above maegashira. Former ōzeki Kirishima is demoted from sekiwake after suffering nine losses in November, dropping out of san'yaku for the first time in over two years. The rankings see five wrestlers promoted from jūryō to makuuchi. Of the five, the only wrestler reaching the top division for the first time is 31-year-old Tamashōhō, who has been competing professionally for over 13 years with one lower-division championship. November's jūryō champion Kinbōzan makes an immediate return to the top division, as do Kitanowaka and Kagayaki. Also returning is 21-year-old Hakuōho, who competed in the top division in July 2023 in just his fourth professional tournament.
- 26: Former maegashira Kyokutaisei retires, ending a 17-year career limited in the 2020s by a serious knee injury.

The winter jungyō (regional tours) were held at the following locations:

- 1: Miyakonojō, Miyazaki
- 2: Nishihara, Kumamoto
- 4: Nagasaki
- 5: Genkai, Saga
- 6: Ōmuta, Fukuoka
- 7: Beppu, Ōita
- 8: Kitakyushu
- 10: Shimonoseki, Yamaguchi
- 11: Akō, Hyōgo
- 12-13: Takarazuka, Hyōgo
- 14: Suita, Ōsaka
- 15: Kawachinagano, Ōsaka
- 17: Tsu, Mie
- 21: Okinawa City

== Deaths ==
- 13 January: Three-time amateur yokozuna Hidetoshi Tanaka (former head of the International Sumo Federation and former Nihon University chairman and sumo club coach), aged 77, of natural causes.
- 24 February: Former maegashira Kotogatake, aged 71, of heart failure.
- 10 March: Former sekiwake Myōbudani, aged 86, of old age.
- 6 April: The 64th yokozuna Akebono, aged 54, of heart failure.
- 25 May: Former komusubi Ōshio, aged 76.
- 20 June: Former makushita Takamishū, aged 56.
- 6 July: Former maegashira Kimurayama, aged 42.
- 28 August: Former komusubi Chiyotenzan, aged 48.
- 22 October: Former ōzeki Asahikuni, aged 77.
- 12 November: The 52nd yokozuna Kitanofuji, aged 82.

== See also ==
- Glossary of sumo terms
- List of active sumo wrestlers
- List of years in sumo
