= Tsushimanada Masamitsu =

Japanese sumo wrestler

Personal information
- Native name: 對馬洋 勝満
- Born: Masamitsu Umeno; June 27, 1993 (age 33) Isahaya, Nagasaki Prefecture, Japan
- Height: 1.85 m (6 ft 1 in)
- Weight: 137.8 kg (304 lb)

Sport
- Sport: Sumo
- Rank: see below
- University team: Nihon University
- Heya: Sakaigawa
- Debut: July 2016
- Highest rank: Jūryō 9 (March, 2023)
- Updated on 31 January 2024

Tsushimanada Masamitsu (Japanese: 對馬洋 勝満; born June 27, 1993, as Masamitsu Umeno (梅野 勝満, Umeno Masamitsu)) is a Japanese professional sumo wrestler from Isahaya, Nagasaki. His highest rank is jūryō 9.

== Early life ==
Masamitsu Umeno comes from a family originally from the island of Tsushima. His grandmother (Hideko Umeno) was the oldest ama diver in Tsushima. He began sumo in his fourth year at Isahaya City Yue Elementary School, later saying of his introduction to sport that he saw it only as an extension of playground games. He then went to Isahaya Agricultural High School, and joined their basketball team before leaving it for the school's sumo club because his high school coach was also the coach of a small sumo club in Isahaya where Umeno used to go. He then graduated from Nihon University where he was a member of their sumo club and a classmate of Churanoumi. During his time as a student, he won the Eastern Japan Student Sumo Championship three time in the under 100 kg category. In his fourth year, however, he suffered a meniscus injury to his left knee and to his anterior cruciate ligament at the All Japan University Sumo Tournament in Uwajima, Ehime on 29 April 2015. He aggravated his injury at the East Japan Student Sumo Individual Weight Classification Championships and was unable to take part in more tournaments during his student years.

After graduating, he worked for a while in a company in Isahaya, but was motivated to become a professional wrestler by Churanoumi. He joined professional sumo in 2016, entering Sakaigawa stable, his master (former komusubi Ryōgoku IV) also being from his home prefecture. His stablemate Hiradoumi, who reached the top makuuchi division in September 2022, is also from Nagasaki, and the two of them have maintained a friendly rivalry. His professional debut was postponed because of his torn anterior cruciate ligament in his left knee, and this injury could have cost him his wrestling career by putting him over the maximum age for becoming a wrestler at the time (23). However, in September 2016, that same age was raised to 25, allowing him to become a wrestler.

== Career ==
During his maezumo debut, he suffered a concussion and was unable to get up. Wrestling under his real name of Umeno Masamitsu, he changed his shikona, or ring name, to Tsushimanada in 2017, to evoke 20th century ōzeki Tsushimanada Yakichi, who was originally from Tsushima Island like his family, and to whom he thought he was related. However, after further investigation his master declared "it was not the case." In 2019, Tsushimanada was competing to win the makushita division championship but failed against then-former ōzeki Terunofuji who was making his comeback in the divisions after his injury and 4 tournament absence. While in makushita, in the final day of the May 2022 tournament, Tsushimanada defeated upper division wrestler and former komusubi Shōhōzan. This proved to be Shōhōzan's final match.

In September 2022, it was announced that he would be promoted to jūryō for the November 2022 tournament, hence being the fourth sekitori in his stable. His promotion also makes him the first wrestler from his hometown to be promoted sekitori in 45 years, since the retirement of former maegashira Shishihō Yoshimasa. Tsushimanada began his first jūryō tournament with a victory over Rōga. However, he suffered a narrow make-kochi losing record in his first tournament as a sekitori, achieving a score of 7–8. After his first tournament at sekitori, he visited his hometown of Isahaya for the first time in seven years, because he decided that he would not return until he became a sekitori. Tsushimanada maintained his sekitori rank due to the balance of promotion and demotion within the ranking. After a good performance during the 2023 January tournament, in which he scored five wins in a row during his last five matches, he was promoted to jūryō 9, his highest rank at the time. However, after a weak performance at the March tournament, Tsushimanada was relegated to jūryō 14, threatening him with demotion back to the makushita division. Nevertheless, he managed to go from a 1–6 score at Day 7, to a kachi-koshi score of 8–7, notably winning his last four bouts and securing his jūryō status. At the following tournament in July, however, Tsushimanada recorded his worst score in the division, relegating him to the makushita division after only five tournaments as a sekitori.

He began 2024 in the rank of makushita 2, putting him in a position of possible repromotion in the jūryō division. Despite being defeated by Kitaharima on the first day, Tsushimanada recorded a run of four consecutive victories (kachi-koshi) before suffering defeat in his sixth match against Hakuōhō, who was returning to competition after missing two tournaments. In January 2024, it was announced that Tsushimanada's score was sufficient to grant him a second promotion to the jūryō division. On this occasion, Tsushimanada confided to Yahoo! Sports that, on the advice of his master, he now saw his new promotion as a springboard to reach the makuuchi division, quoting the former Ryōgoku as having told him that he should have a "stronger feeling than when [he] was aiming for his first jūryō promotion".

== Fighting style ==
At the time of his repromotion to jūryō in 2024, Tsushimanada described his ideal style as an always forward style, made to secure a migi-yotsu, or left hand outside, right hand inside grip on his opponent's mawashi.

== Career record ==
Tsushimanada Masamitsu
Year	January Hatsu basho, Tokyo	March Haru basho, Osaka	May Natsu basho, Tokyo	July Nagoya basho, Nagoya	September Aki basho, Tokyo	November Kyūshū basho, Fukuoka
2016	x	x	(Banzuke-gai)	(Maezumō)	East Jonokuchi #26; 6–1	West Jonidan #45; 6–1
2017	East Sandanme #78; 6–1	East Sandanme #21; 6–1	West Makushita #42; 3–4	West Makushita #52; 4–3	West Makushita #43; 4–3	East Makushita #35; 3–4
2018	West Makushita #46; 5–2	West Makushita #30; 3–4	East Makushita #38; 2–5	West Makushita #52; 4–3	West Makushita #43; 6–1	East Makushita #18; 5–2
2019	West Makushita #10; 4–3	East Makushita #6; 2–5	East Makushita #16; Sat out due to injury 0–0–7	West Makushita #56; Sat out due to injury 0–0–7	West Sandanme #36; 6–1	West Makushita #51; 6–1
2020	West Makushita #21; 3–4	East Makushita #27; 4–3	West Makushita #21; Tournament Cancelled; State of Emergency; 0–0–0	West Makushita #21; 6–1	East Makushita #6; 2–5	West Makushita #22; 3–4
2021	East Makushita #33; 5–2	West Makushita #20; Sat out due to injury 0–0–7	West Makushita #60; 6–1	East Makushita #28; 6–1	West Makushita #9; 6–1	East Makushita #2; 3–5
2022	East Makushita #11; 5–2	East Makushita #4; 4–3	West Makushita #2; 3–5	East Makushita #7; 5–2	East Makushita #4; 5–2	East Jūryō #14; 7–8
2023	East Jūryō #14; 9–6	East Jūryō #9; 4–11	West Jūryō #14; 8–7	West Jūryō #11; 3–12	West Makushita #2; 3–4	West Makushita #4; 4–3
2024	East Makushita #2; 5–2	West Jūryō #12; 7–8	West Jūryō #12; 7–8	West Jūryō #12; 1–14	East Makushita #10; 2–5	West Makushita #21; 2–5
2025	West Makushita #38; 6–1	East Makushita #14; 2–3–2	West Makushita #26; 3–4	West Makushita #34; 3–4	East Makushita #44; 4–3	East Makushita #35; 4–3
2026	East Makushita #27; 2–5	West Makushita #44; 4–3	East Makushita #34; 6–1–P	West Makushita #13; 4–3	East Makushita #11; 5–2	East Makushita #6; 1–6
Record given as wins–losses–absences Top division champion Top division runner-up Retired Non-participation Jūryō Lower divisions Sanshō key: F=Fighting spirit; O=Outstanding performance; T=Technique Also shown: ★=Kinboshi; P=Playoff(s); Divisions: Makuuchi — Jūryō — Makushita — Sandanme — Jonidan — Jonokuchi Makuuchi ranks: Yokozuna — Ōzeki — Sekiwake — Komusubi — Maegashira

== See also ==
- Glossary of sumo terms
- List of active sumo wrestlers
