= Ichiyamamoto Daiki =

Japanese sumo wrestler

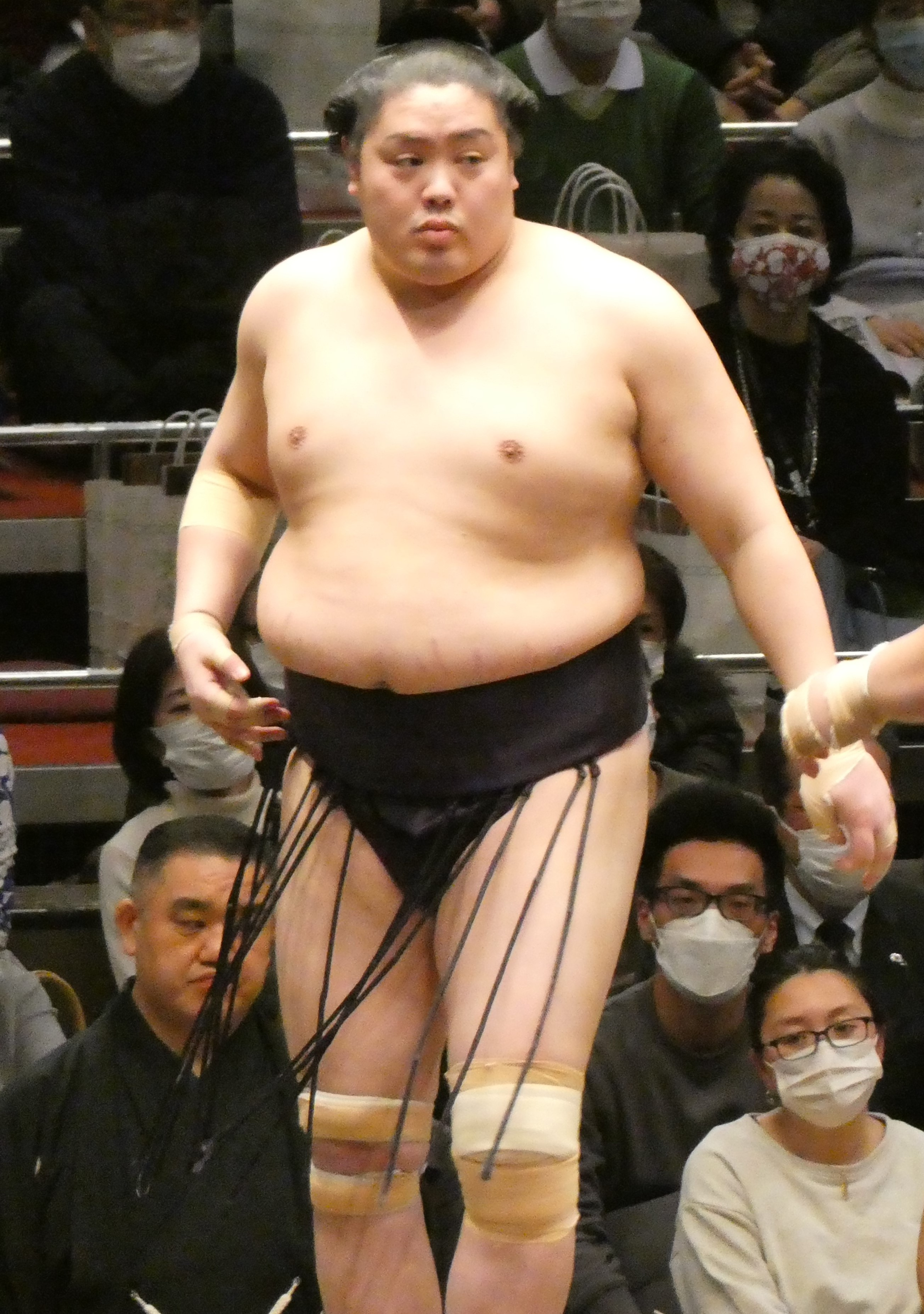

Personal information
- Native name: 一山本 大生
- Born: Daiki Yamamoto; 1 October 1993 (age 33) Iwanai, Hokkaido, Japan
- Height: 1.88 m (6 ft 2 in)
- Weight: 160 kg (350 lb; 25 st)

Sport
- Sport: Sumo
- Rank: see below
- University team: Chuo University
- Heya: Hanaregoma
- Debut: January 2017
- Highest rank: Maegashira 1 (January 2026)
- Championships: 1 (Jonokuchi); 2 (Jūryō)
- Special Prizes: 2 (Fighting spirit)
- Gold Stars: 1 Hōshōryū
- Updated on December 22, 2025

Ichiyamamoto Daiki (Japanese: 一山本 大生; born 1 October 1993 as Daiki Yamamoto (山本 大生, Yamamoto Daiki)) is a Japanese professional sumo wrestler from Iwanai, Hokkaido. A former amateur wrestler at Chuo University, he made his professional debut in January 2017, reaching the top makuuchi division in July 2021. His highest rank has been maegashira 1. He wrestles for Hanaregoma stable.

== Career ==
Yamamoto did amateur sumo at university but then became a civil servant, and had to get special dispensation from the Japan Sumo Association to join professionally as he was over the age limit of 23. He made his professional debut in 2017, wrestling with the Nishonoseki stable (now renamed Hanaregoma stable) and he won the jonokuchi division championship in his first tournament. He reached the top makuuchi division in July 2021. He began his top division career with a win over Ishiura with a rare backwards belt throw, or harimanage. He reached seven wins and two losses by Day 9, but then suffered five straight defeats and only secured his kachi-koshi or majority of wins on the final day. The September 2021 tournament was less successful for him as he could win only four matches and was demoted back to jūryō. However in November he earned immediate promotion back to the top division by taking the jūryō division championship or yūshō with a 13–2 record.

Ichiyamamoto began the May 2022 tournament with five straight wins, and on Day 10 was the co-leader with Takanoshō on eight wins and two losses. However he lost his last five matches to finish with an 8–7 record.

Ichiyamamoto and his stable were forced to withdraw on Day 9 of the July 2022 tournament in Nagoya after stablemaster Hanaregoma tested positive for COVID-19. Ichiyamamato stood at six wins and two losses at the time, and his ranking for the September tournament was once again east maegashira 13 (although he was two spots closer to jūryō because of the increased size of sanyaku).

Ichiyamamoto dropped to jūryō for the July 2023 tournament, where he withdrew with left knee issues after suffering four defeats in his first four matches. He was set to reappear on Day 8 in a bid to prevent possible demotion from sekitori status.

On the 10th day of the September 2023 tournament in the jūryō division, Ichiyamamoto, who was then one defeat behind Ōnosato, the competition leader halfway through the tournament, defeated him to lead the competition as co-leader. In doing so, he also ended Ōnosato's winning streak of 9 consecutive victories and prevented him from becoming the jūryō wrestler with the most consecutive victories since the start of a competition in sumo history. Ichiyamamoto managed to maintain his status as tournament leader with Ōnosato, the two wrestlers recording twelve wins and two defeats on the final day of the tournament, which then became decisive in deciding the tie. While Ōnosato lost his match against Rōga, Ichiyamamoto won his against Daiamami, winning his second jūryō championship, the first since 2021.

During the November 2023 tournament, Ichiyamamoto recorded his best performance in the makuuchi division with a sixth straight victory since the start of the competition. Taking the lead in the title race, Ichiyamamoto lost his lead after suffering defeats at the hands of Sakaigawa stablemates Sadanoumi (on Day 7) and Hiradoumi (Day 10). Remaining in the lead group, Ichiyamamoto's title hopes came to an end when he recorded a fourth defeat against Midorifuji on the thirteenth day of the tournament, automatically eliminating him from the title race for good. On the final day of the tournament Ichiyamamoto secured his eleventh win, which earned him his first Fighting Spirit Prize.

At the July 2025 tournament Ichiyamamoto emerged as the sole leader on Day 9, becoming the first sumo wrestler to secure a winning record at the new Aichi International Arena in Nagoya. Despite this, he only managed one more win before suffering five consecutive losses to finish the tournament with a 9-6 record.

== Fighting style ==
Ichiyamamoto is a tsuki/oshi type wrestler, who prefers thrusting and pushing his opponents to fighting on the mawashi. He wins most of his bouts by oshidashi (push out), hatakikomi (slap down) or tsuki dashi (thrust out).

== Personal life ==
Ichiyamamoto maintains the running gag of declaring himself Wakatakakage's number one fan in the various media he is invited to appear in. To this end, he maintains a collection of merchandise bearing the wrestler's image.

== Career record ==
Ichiyamamoto Daiki
Year	January Hatsu basho, Tokyo	March Haru basho, Osaka	May Natsu basho, Tokyo	July Nagoya basho, Nagoya	September Aki basho, Tokyo	November Kyūshū basho, Fukuoka
2017	(Maezumō)	East Jonokuchi #15; 7–0; Champion	East Jonidan #10; 6–1	East Sandanme #49; 6–1	West Makushita #57; 6–1	East Makushita #26; 4–3
2018	East Makushita #21; 5–2	East Makushita #11; 5–2	East Makushita #5; 4–3	East Makushita #3; 3–4	West Makushita #5; 1–6	West Makushita #26; 4–3
2019	West Makushita #19; 4–3	East Makushita #13; 6–1	East Makushita #3; 5–2	East Jūryō #13; 9–6	East Jūryō #9; 9–6	West Jūryō #6; 0–2–13
2020	West Makushita #5; Sat out due to injury 0–0–7	West Makushita #45; 5–2	West Makushita #28; Tournament Cancelled; State of Emergency; 0–0–0	West Makushita #28; 5–2	West Makushita #13; 4–3	West Makushita #8; 5–2
2021	West Makushita #3; 4–3	West Jūryō #13; 10–5	East Jūryō #8; 10–5	East Maegashira #17; 8–7	East Maegashira #15; 4–11	West Jūryō #4; 13–2; Champion
2022	West Maegashira #14; 5–10	West Maegashira #17; 8–7	West Maegashira #15; 8–7	East Maegashira #13; 6–3–6	East Maegashira #13; 6–9	East Maegashira #14; 7–8
2023	East Maegashira #14; 10–5	East Maegashira #8; 4–11	East Maegashira #15; 4–11	East Jūryō #3; 4–9–2	West Jūryō #7; 13–2; Champion	West Maegashira #14; 11–4; F
2024	East Maegashira #7; 5–10	East Maegashira #11; 7–8	East Maegashira #12; 8–7	East Maegashira #11; 8–7	East Maegashira #9; 7–8	East Maegashira #10; 8–7
2025	West Maegashira #6; 8–7	West Maegashira #4; 7–8 ★	West Maegashira #4; 5–10	West Maegashira #8; 9–6	West Maegashira #5; 4–11	East Maegashira #8; 11–4; F
2026	East Maegashira #1; 4–11	East Maegashira #6; 9–6	West Maegashira #2; 6–9	West Maegashira #4; 6–9	West Maegashira #6; 4–11	East Maegashira #12; 9–6
Record given as wins–losses–absences Top division champion Top division runner-up Retired Non-participation Jūryō Lower divisions Sanshō key: F=Fighting spirit; O=Outstanding performance; T=Technique Also shown: ★=Kinboshi; P=Playoff(s); Divisions: Makuuchi — Jūryō — Makushita — Sandanme — Jonidan — Jonokuchi Makuuchi ranks: Yokozuna — Ōzeki — Sekiwake — Komusubi — Maegashira

== See also ==
- Glossary of sumo terms
- List of active sumo wrestlers
- List of active gold star earners
- List of active special prize winners
- List of sumo top division runners-up
- List of sumo second division champions
