= Churanoumi Yoshihisa =

Japanese sumo wrestler (born 1993)

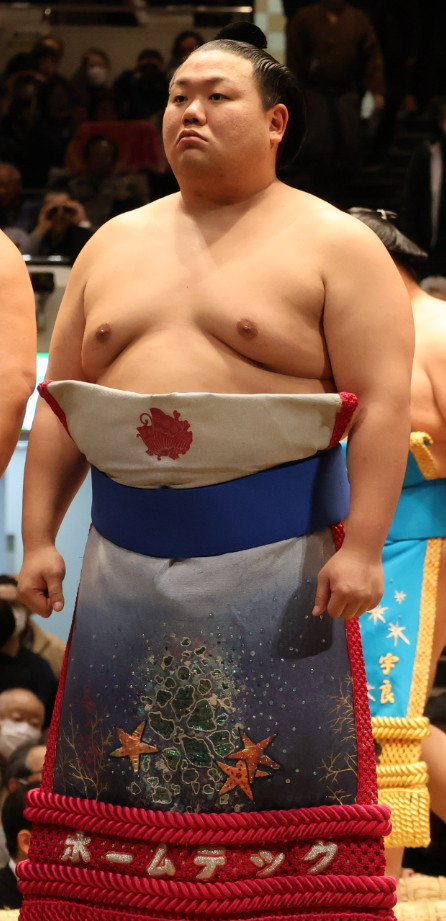

Personal information
- Native name: 美ノ海 義久
- Born: Shinji Kizaki; May 6, 1993 (age 33) Uruma, Okinawa Prefecture, Japan
- Height: 1.76 m (5 ft 9 1/2 in)
- Weight: 157 kg (346 lb; 24.7 st)

Sport
- Sport: Sumo
- Rank: see below
- University team: Nihon University
- Heya: Kise
- Debut: March 2016
- Highest rank: Komusubi (November 2026)
- Championships: 3 (Makushita, Sandanme, Jonidan)
- Special Prizes: 2 (Fighting Spirit)
- Updated on October 26, 2026

Churanoumi Yoshihisa (Japanese: 美ノ海 義久; born 6 May 1993 as Shinji Kizaki (木﨑 信志, Kizaki Shinji)) is a professional Japanese sumo wrestler from Okinawa Prefecture who debuted in March 2016. Wrestling for Kise stable, he has won three lower-division championships and reached the top makuuchi division in January 2024. He is the first sumo wrestler in his prefecture's history to have risen to the san'yaku ranks, having reached his highest rank to date—komusubi—in the November 2026 tournament.

His younger brother was his stablemate at Kise under the shikona Kizakiumi until his retirement in August 2020.

== Early life ==
Kizaki started sumo wrestling in elementary school in his native Okinawa. While in elementary school, he trained with high school students at Chūbu Norin High School, where his uncle was the sumo coach. In his second year of junior high school he placed in the top 16 in the National Junior High School Sumo Tournament. Originally intending to enter Chūbu Norin, he changed his mind and attended Tottori Jōhoku High School in Tottori Prefecture after visiting that school for a training session. One of his classmates, whom he defeated in individual competition, was future makuuchi champion Ichinojō. He attended Nihon University, where he was a member of their sumo club and a classmate of Tsushimanada.

== Sumo career ==
Kizaki was recruited by former maegashira Higonoumi, the stablemaster of Kise stable. Ineligible to start higher on the banzuke under the tsukedashi system at the time, Kizaki's maezumo debut took place at the March 2016 tournament. In the following tournament he was officially ranked at the bottom jonokuchi division and won six of his seven matches. He then moved up the rankings, winning the jonidan championship in July and the sandanme championship in September with perfect records.

In May 2019 Kizaki was promoted to sekitori status with the rank of jūryō, having just won the makushita championship. Upon this promotion he changed his shikona, or ring name, from his birth surname to Churanoumi. After suffering a ten-loss record he was immediately demoted back to makushita, where he stayed until he was promoted to jūryō for the second time in January 2020. Aside from one tournament in July 2021 spent in makushita, he remained in the jūryō division; in September 2023 he won 10 of 15 matches for the first time in his career.

In November 2023 Churanoumi was promoted to the top makuuchi division. He told reporters that he was happy to receive the top-division promotion before the tournament in Kyushu, where many Okinawans come.

During the March 2025 tournament, Churanoumi remained in the group of wrestlers competing for the championship until the ninth day, when he lost to Tokihayate. For his performance during the tournament, however, he was awarded the Fighting Spirit prize.

In the March 2026 tournament, Churanoumi reached a career-high rank of maegashira 2. Despite only winning four of his fifteen matches, Churanoumi stood out for defeating eventual champion sekiwake Kirishima on Day 2, as well as Ōzeki Aonishiki, who was seeking promotion to Yokozuna, on Day 4.

During the September 2026 tournament, Churanoumi was listed as one of the recipients of a special prize for Fighting Spirit, conditional on him securing a tenth victory on the final day against Daieishō. Churanoumi defeated Daieishō and won the prize.

When the banzuke for the November 2026 tournament was unveiled, it was announced that Churanoumi would be promoted to the rank of komusubi, reaching his highest ever rank and thereby becoming the first wrestler in the history of Okinawa Prefecture to reach that level in the rankings.

== Fighting style ==
Churanoumi uses pushing and thrusting techniques, with his top kimarite being oshidashi (frontal push out) and yorikiri (frontal force out). He most commonly uses a hidari-yotsu grip, where his left hand is inside his opponent's right arm.

== Career record ==
Churanoumi Yoshihisa
Year	January Hatsu basho, Tokyo	March Haru basho, Osaka	May Natsu basho, Tokyo	July Nagoya basho, Nagoya	September Aki basho, Tokyo	November Kyūshū basho, Fukuoka
2016	x	(Maezumō)	West Jonokuchi #15; 6–1	East Jonidan #38; 7–0–P; Champion	West Sandanme #39; 7–0; Champion	East Makushita #26; 4–3
2017	East Makushita #21; 5–2	West Makushita #13; 4–3	East Makushita #9; 4–3	East Makushita #7; 5–2	West Makushita #3; 3–4	East Makushita #7; 3–4
2018	East Makushita #11; 4–3	East Makushita #7; 4–3	East Makushita #4; 4–3	West Jūryō #14; 5–10	West Makushita #2; 3–4	West Makushita #5; 3–4
2019	East Makushita #9; 4–3	East Makushita #5; 7–0; Champion	East Jūryō #14; 5–10	West Makushita #3; 3–4	East Makushita #6; 5–2	East Makushita #1; 4–3
2020	West Jūryō #12; 8–7	West Jūryō #7; 6–9	West Jūryō #9; Tournament Cancelled; State of Emergency; 0–0–0	West Jūryō #9; 8–7	East Jūryō #7; 8–7	East Jūryō #6; 8–7
2021	West Jūryō #3; 7–7–1	East Jūryō #5; 5–10	West Jūryō #9; 3–12	West Makushita #3; 5–2	East Jūryō #14; 9–6	West Jūryō #8; 7–8
2022	West Jūryō #9; 6–9	West Jūryō #10; 5–10	West Jūryō #14; 9–6	West Jūryō #9; 9–6	West Jūryō #6; 9–6	East Jūryō #2; 4–11
2023	East Jūryō #6; 4–11	West Jūryō #10; 9–6	West Jūryō #7; 7–8	West Jūryō #7; 8–7	East Jūryō #5; 10–5	West Maegashira #15; 9–6
2024	East Maegashira #13; 7–8	West Maegashira #13; 7–8	West Maegashira #13; 8–7	West Maegashira #12; 10–5	West Maegashira #7; 10–5	East Maegashira #4; 4–11
2025	East Maegashira #9; 4–11	West Maegashira #14; 11–4; F	West Maegashira #7; 4–11	East Maegashira #13; 9–6	West Maegashira #10; 9–6	East Maegashira #7; 8–7
2026	West Maegashira #5; 9–6	West Maegashira #2; 4–11	East Maegashira #6; 9–6	West Maegashira #2; 7–8	West Maegashira #3; 10–5; F	East Komusubi #1; 4–11
Record given as wins–losses–absences Top division champion Top division runner-up Retired Non-participation Jūryō Lower divisions Sanshō key: F=Fighting spirit; O=Outstanding performance; T=Technique Also shown: ★=Kinboshi; P=Playoff(s); Divisions: Makuuchi — Jūryō — Makushita — Sandanme — Jonidan — Jonokuchi Makuuchi ranks: Yokozuna — Ōzeki — Sekiwake — Komusubi — Maegashira

== See also ==
- Glossary of sumo terms
- List of active sumo wrestlers
- List of active special prize winners
- List of komusubi
