= Futagoyama stable (2018) =

Stable of sumo wrestlers

Coordinates: 35.75859°N 139.86798°E

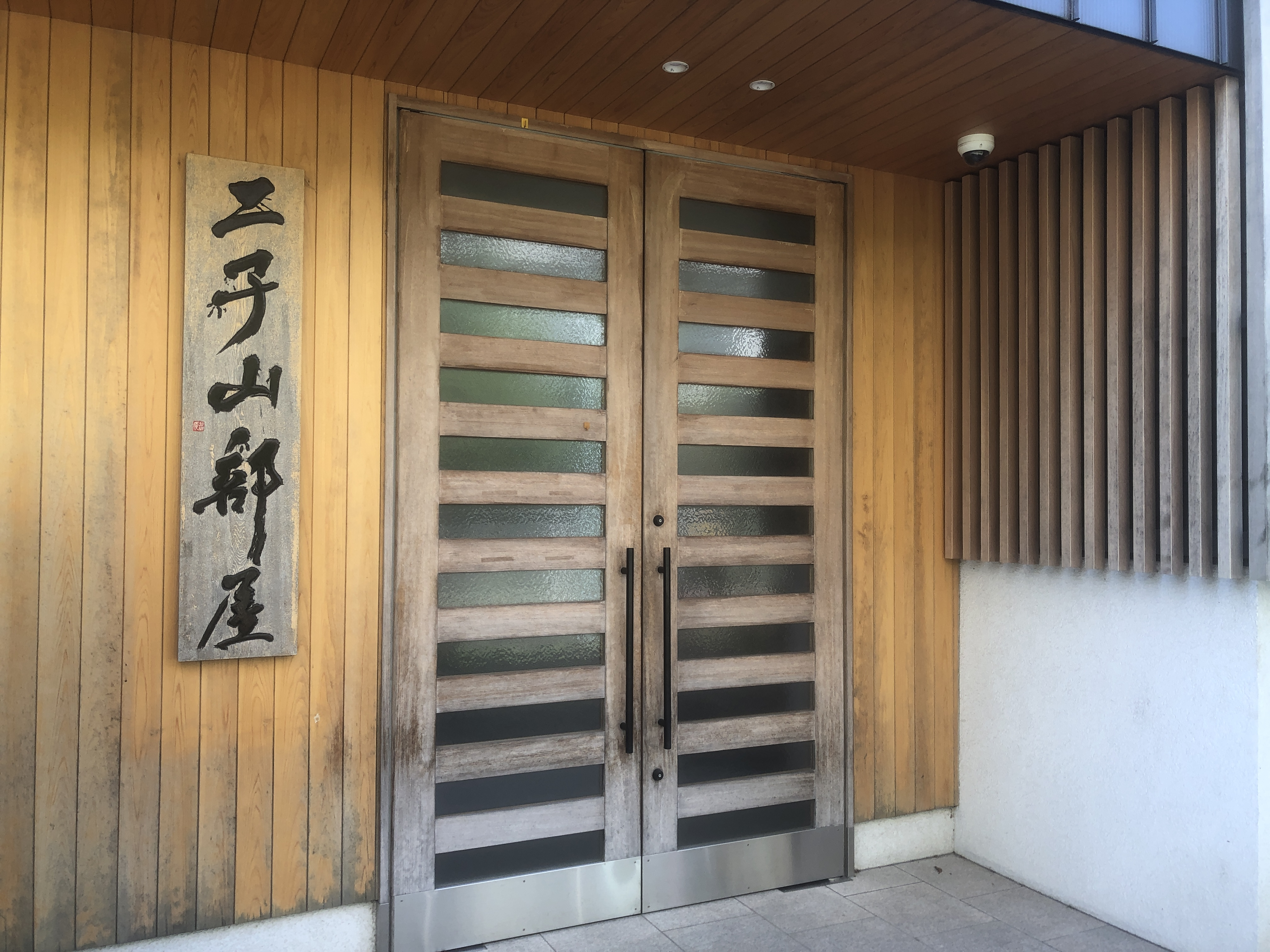

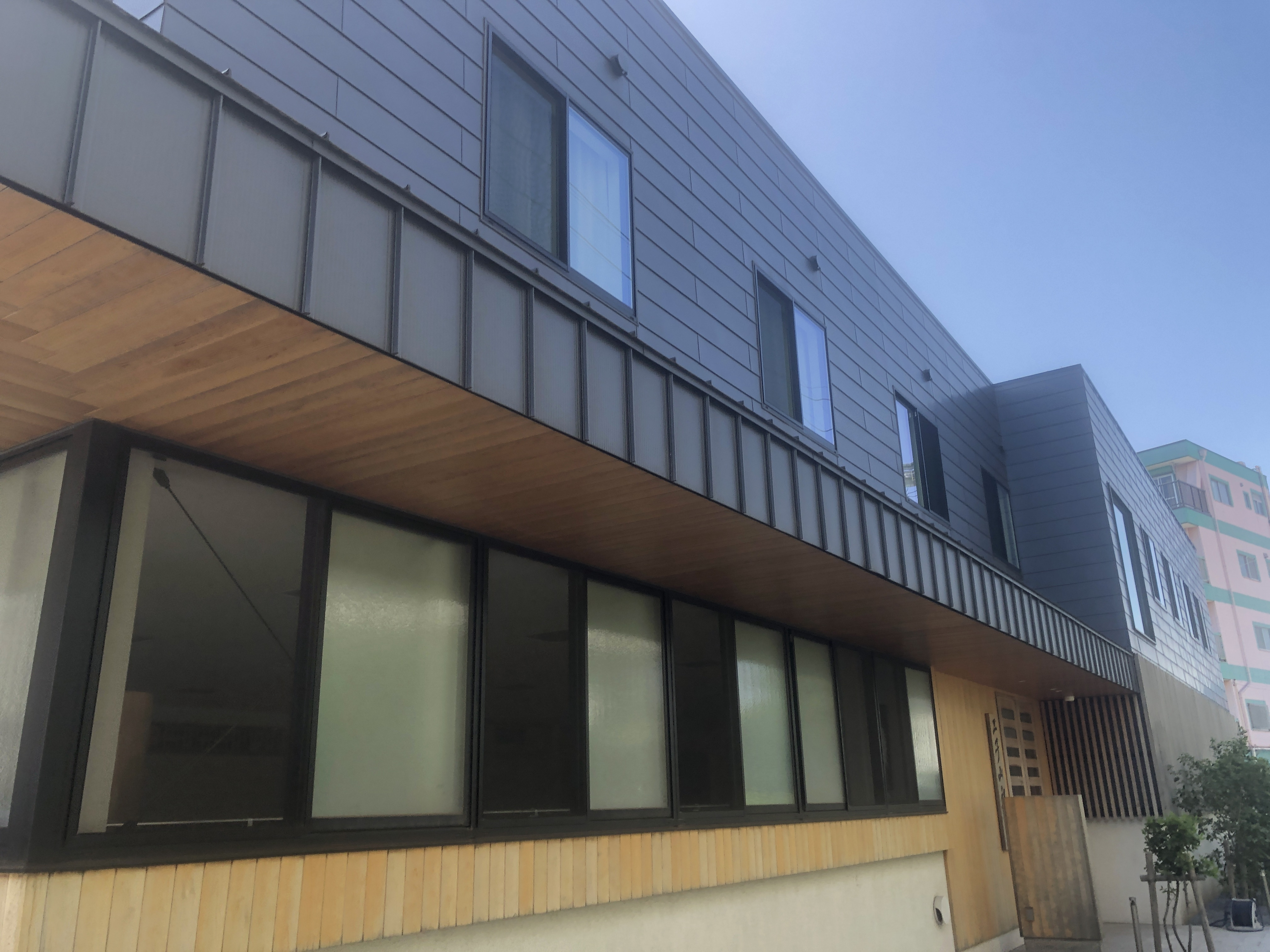

Futagoyama stable (二子山部屋, Futagoyama-beya) is a stable of sumo wrestlers, part of the Dewanoumi group of stables. It was established on 1 April 2018 by former ōzeki Miyabiyama, who branched off from Fujishima stable, taking five low ranked wrestlers with him. and was originally located in Tokorozawa, Saitama. As of May 2026, the stable has 18 active wrestlers.

The stable's foreign recruit is former high school yokozuna Rōga, who is of Russian and Mongolian heritage and made his debut in November 2018. He became the stable's first sekitori upon his promotion to the jūryō division for the November 2022 tournament. One year later, in November 2023, he was promoted to the top makuuchi division.

In April 2021 the stable announced plans to move to Shibamata District, Katsushika, occupying the premises previously used by the now-defunct Azumazeki stable.

On 7 February 2023, Futagoyama stable, along with Ōshima stable and Kokonoe stable, signed a partnership and cooperation agreement with the Katsushika Ward of Tokyo. The agreement was presented as having the objective of cooperating further in a wide range of areas, including tourism, culture, sports, and educational promotion, and work closely to revitalize local communities.

In May 2023, the stable launched its own YouTube channel called "Sumo Food". The channel features meals and the daily lives of the stable's wrestlers. Unusually, the stable chose to include English subtitles, making the channel particularly popular with foreign audiences. In January 2024, the channel became one of Japan's fastest-growing YouTube channels in terms of subscribers, with some videos exceeding one million views.

== Owners ==
- 2018–present: 14th Futagoyama Masataka (iin, ōzeki Miyabiyama, born 1977)

== Notable wrestlers ==
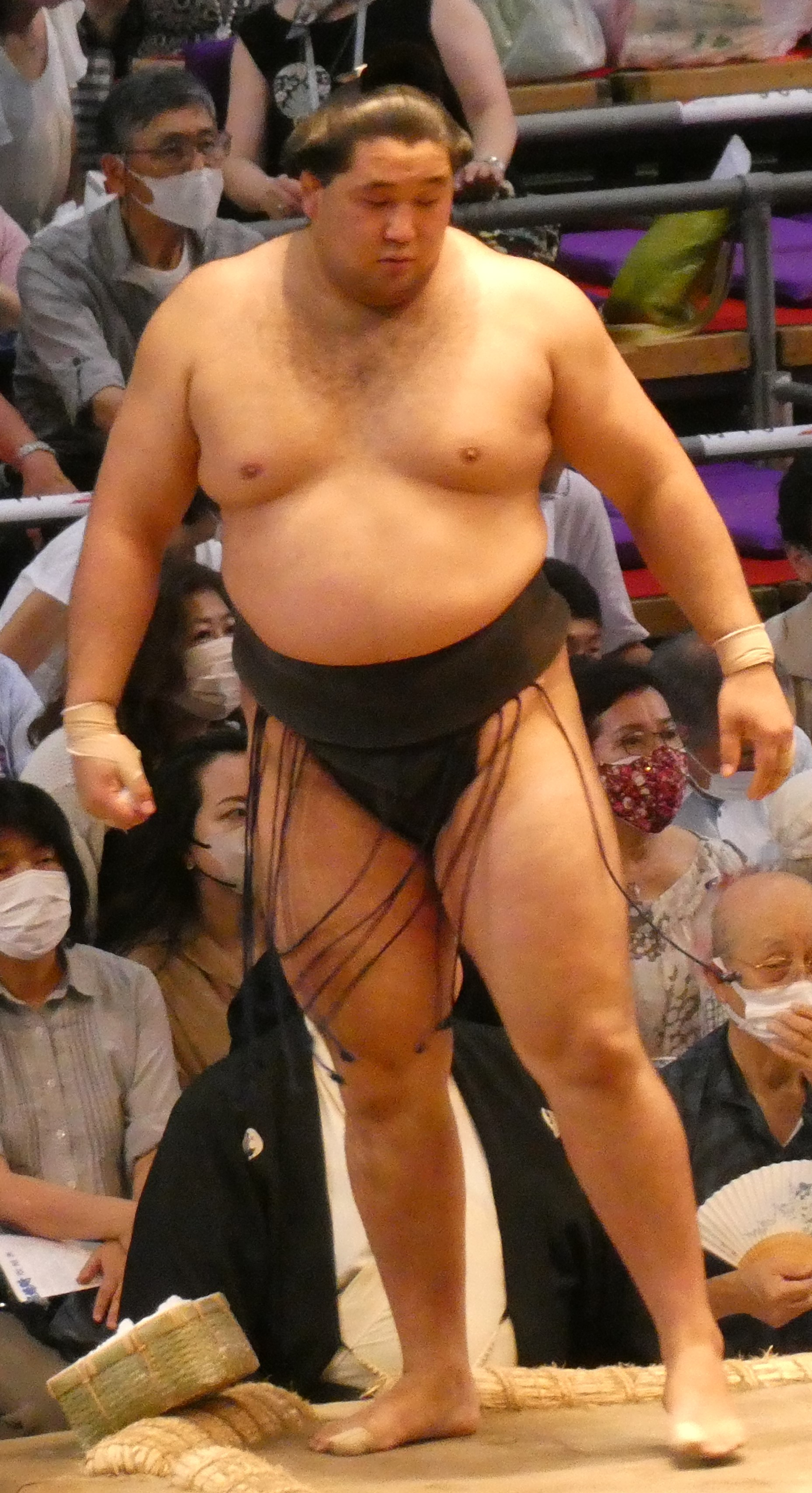
Rōga became the stable's first sekitori in 2022

- Rōga (highest rank: maegashira, born 1999)
- Nabatame (highest rank: jūryō, born 2002)
- Mita (highest rank: jūryō, born 2001)

== Location and access ==
Current location: 2-10-13 Shibamata, Katsushika Ward, Tokyo. 7–8 minutes walk from Shibamata Station (Keisei Kanamachi Line).

Former Location: Iwaoka 366, Tokorozawa, Saitama
30 min walk from Shin-Tokorozawa station on Seibu Shinjuku Line

== See also ==
- List of sumo stables
