= Rōga Tokiyoshi =

Russian sumo wrestler

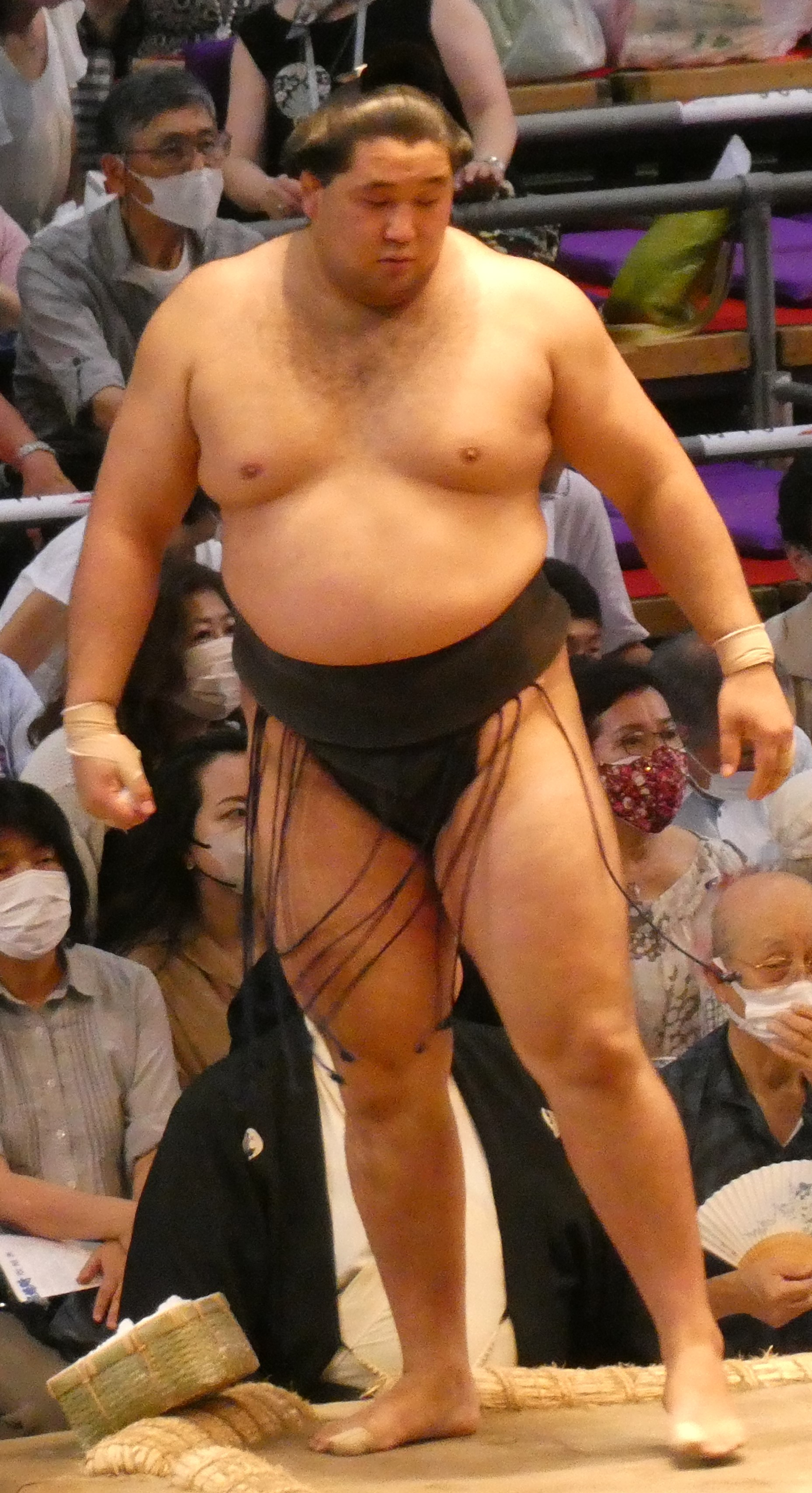
- Rōga in July 2022

Personal information
- Native name: 狼雅 外喜義
- Born: Amartuvshin Amarsanaa; March 2, 1999 (age 27) Kyzyl, Tuva, Russia
- Height: 1.84 m (6 ft 1/2 in)
- Weight: 160 kg (350 lb; 25 st)

Sport
- Sport: Sumo
- Rank: see below
- Heya: Futagoyama
- Debut: November 2018
- Highest rank: Maegashira 5 (September 2026)
- Championships: 2 (Jonidan, Jonokuchi)
- Updated on August 31, 2026

Rōga Tokiyoshi (Japanese: 狼雅 外喜義; born 2 March 1999 as Amartuvshin Amarsanaa (Russian: Амартувшин Амарсанаа)) is a Russian-Mongolian professional sumo wrestler from Kyzyl, Tuva. Wrestling for the Futagoyama stable, he made his professional debut in September 2018, and became sekitori when he reached the jūryō division in November 2022. As of September 2018, he is the only wrestler from Russia competing in professional sumo.

== Early life and sumo background ==
Rōga was born to a Buryat father and a Tuvan and Russian mother. He grew up in Kyzyl, Tuva, Russia, a region near the border of Mongolia. As a child, he practiced sambo wrestling and judo. He moved to Mongolia at the age of 14 and obtained the Mongolian nationality at the age of 15. The adoption of Mongolian nationality has been the source of confusion since his professional debut, with Rōga first listed as Mongolian on the Japan Sumo Association website although he himself insists that he is Russian.

When he was 15, he travelled to Japan to participate in the 2014 Hakuhō Cup. He placed 8th in the individual junior high school division, so Yokozuna Hakuhō recommended him to enroll at Tottori Jōhoku High School's sumo club, where he became classmates with future makuuchi-ranked wrestler Takerufuji. In his third year, he defeated NSSU Kashiwa High School wrestler Hōshōryū at the Inter-High School Championships to become the first foreign-born high school yokozuna. Since then he has regularly announced his intention to close the ranking gap between himself and Hōshōryū, the latter having entered professional sumo before Rōga. After graduation, he was recruited into Futagoyama stable in September 2018 under a business visa.

== Career ==
=== Early career ===
Rōga was given his shikona, or ring name, because it is a combination of the first kanji (雅) from his master's name (former ōzeki Miyabiyama) and "wolf" (狼), a symbol of strength coming from his Mongolian roots. The first shikona given name that was given to him, Chikara (力), means "strength". Rōga made a strong debut as he won all seven matches in his first tournament to claim the jonokuchi championship. In the following tournament, he remained undefeated and scored a victory against former ōzeki Terunofuji, who just made his return in competition, in a playoff to win the jonidan championship. In the following tournament, he scored a 5–2 record and was promoted to the makushita division. With four consecutive 5-2 records, he was promoted to makushita 8 and was close to a jūryō promotion. However, due to injury, he achieved mixed results at the top makushita ranks. In March 2022, he changed his shikona first name "Chikara" to "Tokiyoshi". He chose this specific first name as a tribute to the principal of Tottori Jōhoku High School and president of his sumo club, Tokiyoshi Ishiura. In September 2022, while ranked at the top of makushita, Rōga ended the tournament with a 4–3 record and secured a jūryō promotion along with Tsushimanada for the Kyūshū tournament of November. Rōga became the first sekitori from Futagoyama stable since its establishment in 2018 and the first wrestler from Russia to be promoted to jūryō since Amūru in 2012. Since his promotion he has secured winning records, reaching the rank of juryō 1 for the September 2023 tournament. During this tournament, Rōga managed to score an eighth victory on the final day of the championship over Ōnosato, beating one of the championship leaders by sukuinage.

During the October 2023 tour, Rōga took part for the first time in the joint sekitori training sessions, normally reserved for makuuchi-ranked wrestlers. During this training, along with maegashira Shōnannoumi and komusubi Tobizaru, he took part in the largest number of bouts of the day, wrestling 17 matches. It was noted by several observers that he fought on equal terms with the wrestlers in the highest division.

=== Makuuchi promotion ===
At the banzuke unveiling for the November 2023 tournament, it was announced that Rōga would be promoted to maegashira 16, making him the first wrestler from Russia to reach the makuuchi division in 9 years, after Amūru in November 2014. On the occasion of his promotion, his master, Futagoyama Oyakata, was delighted to see him make his debut in sumo's top division only a year after being promoted to the second-highest jūryō division.

Rōga sat out the first four days of the January 2025 tournament after suffering a torn thigh muscle. He returned on Day 5, but withdrew again on Day 7 after two straight losses. His stablemaster Futagoyama said that Rōga was not in his sumo form and would not return to the tournament.

== Personal life ==
Rōga got married in October 2026 after a year of dating.

== Career record ==
Rōga Tokiyoshi
Year	January Hatsu basho, Tokyo	March Haru basho, Osaka	May Natsu basho, Tokyo	July Nagoya basho, Nagoya	September Aki basho, Tokyo	November Kyūshū basho, Fukuoka
2018	x	x	x	x	x	(Maezumō)
2019	East Jonokuchi #23; 7–0; Champion	West Jonidan #15; 7–0–P; Champion	East Sandanme #22; 5–2	West Makushita #57; 5–2	West Makushita #43; 5–2	East Makushita #28; 5–2
2020	East Makushita #17; 5–2	East Makushita #8; 2–5	West Makushita #16; Tournament Cancelled; State of Emergency; 0–0–0	West Makushita #16; 2–5	West Makushita #30; 6–1	West Makushita #12; 6–1
2021	West Makushita #2; 3–4	East Makushita #6; 4–3	East Makushita #3; 2–5	West Makushita #10; 4–3	West Makushita #6; 3–4	East Makushita #13; 5–2
2022	East Makushita #7; 3–4	East Makushita #12; 6–1	East Makushita #4; 4–3	East Makushita #2; 4–3	West Makushita #1; 4–3	West Jūryō #13; 9–6
2023	East Jūryō #9; 9–6	East Jūryō #5; 8–7	West Jūryō #4; 9–6	East Jūryō #2; 8–7	East Jūryō #1; 8–7	East Maegashira #16; 5–10
2024	East Jūryō #3; 9–6	West Maegashira #15; 7–8	West Maegashira #15; 7–8	West Maegashira #15; 9–6	West Maegashira #10; 8–7	East Maegashira #8; 7–8
2025	East Maegashira #8; 0–3–12	East Jūryō #3; 11–4	West Maegashira #14; 9–6	West Maegashira #10; 7–8	West Maegashira #11; 7–8	West Maegashira #11; 8–7
2026	West Maegashira #9; 7–8	West Maegashira #10; 5–10	West Maegashira #14; 9–6	West Maegashira #8; 9–6	East Maegashira #5; 6–9	East Maegashira #8; 10–5
Record given as wins–losses–absences Top division champion Top division runner-up Retired Non-participation Jūryō Lower divisions Sanshō key: F=Fighting spirit; O=Outstanding performance; T=Technique Also shown: ★=Kinboshi; P=Playoff(s); Divisions: Makuuchi — Jūryō — Makushita — Sandanme — Jonidan — Jonokuchi Makuuchi ranks: Yokozuna — Ōzeki — Sekiwake — Komusubi — Maegashira

== See also ==
- Glossary of sumo terms
- List of active sumo wrestlers
- List of Mongolian sumo wrestlers
- List of non-Japanese sumo wrestlers
