= Hiradoumi Yūki =

Japanese professional sumo wrestler

Hiradoumi Yūki 平戸海 雄貴
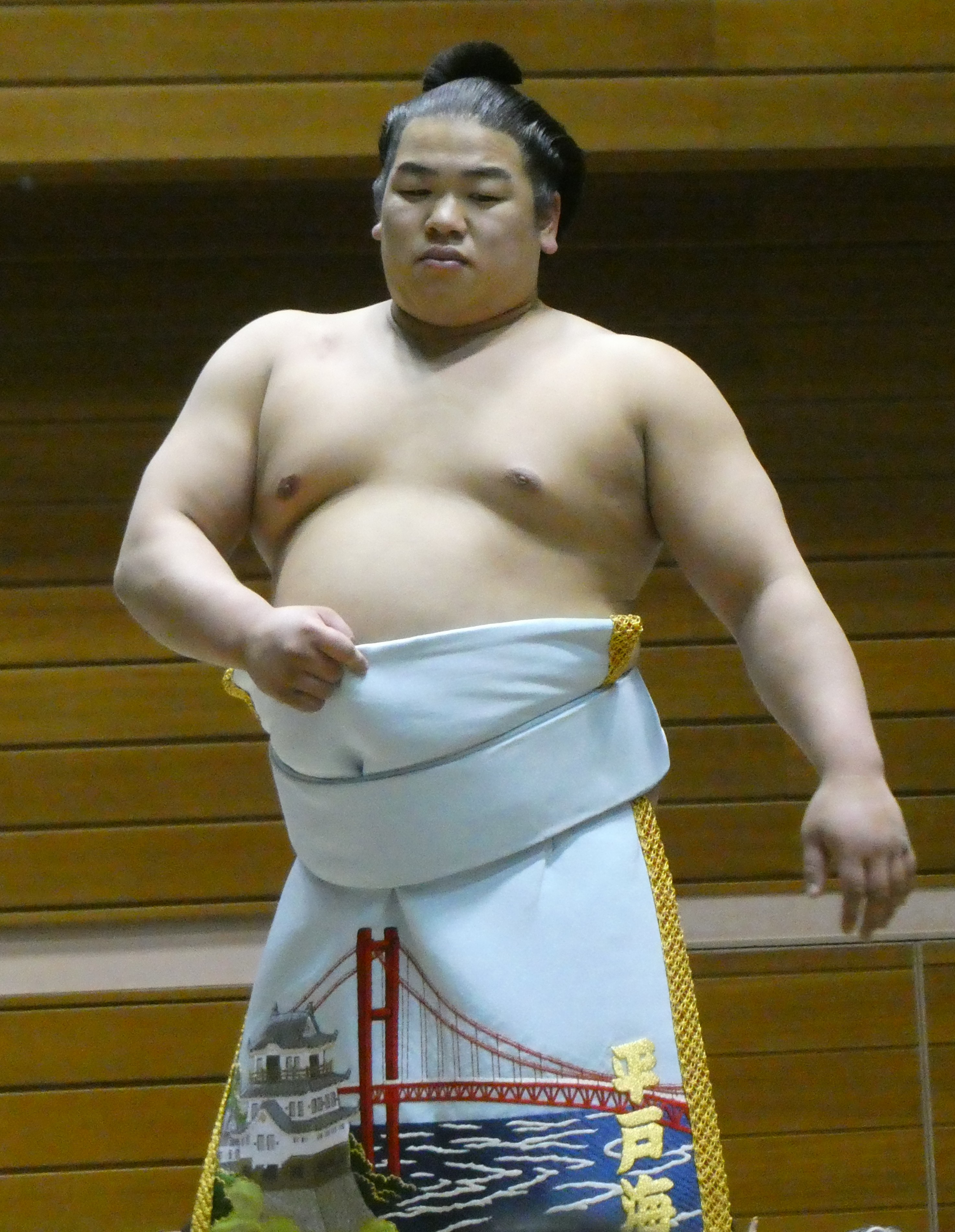
- Hiradoumi in April 2023

Personal information
- Born: 20 April 2000 (age 26) Hirado, Nagasaki, Japan
- Height: 1.78 m (5 ft 10 in)
- Weight: 141 kg (311 lb; 22.2 st)

Sport
- Sport: Sumo
- Rank: See below
- Heya: Sakaigawa
- Debut: March 2016
- Highest rank: Komusubi (July 2024)
- Special Prizes: 1 (Technique)
- Updated on 31 August 2024

Hiradoumi Yūki (Japanese: 平戸海 雄貴; born 20 April 2000 as Yūki Sakaguchi (坂口 雄貴, Sakaguchi Yūki)) is a Japanese professional sumo wrestler from Hirado. He wrestles for the Sakaigawa stable. His highest rank is komusubi.

== Career ==
=== Early career ===
Sakaguchi Yūki comes from the city of Hirado, in the Nagasaki Prefecture. He started sumo wrestling at Himosashi Elementary School, under the guidance of former sandanme-wrestler Sakao Hiroki who's also from Hirado, but didn't take the sport seriously until sixth grade, mimicking the serious training of his elders in the club. As a kid he participated in the Wanpaku National Sumo Championships for three consecutive years. In high school, he participated to the National Junior High School Sumo Championship. During this tournament, he stayed at the Sakaigawa stable to be lodged and trained there.

He decided to become a professional wrestler during his third year of junior high school. In 2016, after graduating, he decided to join professional sumo and entered Sakaigawa stable. He did so because the stable's head coach (former komusubi Ryōgoku) is also from Nagasaki and because he felt that the stable gave him a good feeling, as it was made up of five active sekitori at the time.

During his shin-deshi presentation, he shared the ring with Asanoyama and Yutakayama. In 2017, he changed his shikona to Hiradoumi to pay homage to his hometown. During his years at the stable he struck up a friendship with Tsushimanada, with whom he maintains a friendly rivalry, competing with him at the time to see who would be promoted to sekitori ahead of the other. During his years in the lower divisions, he served as tsukebito (assistant) to Ōzeki Gōeidō.

In 2021, it was announced that he will be promoted to sumo's second highest division (jūryō) for the November tournament. He is the first wrestler within his stable to reach sekitoriship since Shironoryū, who reached the jūryō division in 2010. Following a strong performance in the July 2022 tournament, he was promoted to the makuuchi division. It was the first time in eleven years that a wrestler from Nagasaki prefecture was promoted to the top division. The last wrestler to do so was Sadanofuji, Hiradoumi's coach at Sakaigawa stable, who made his makuuchi debut at the Kyūshū tournament in 2011.

=== Makuuchi career ===
Hiradoumi entered the top division during the September 2022 tournament, at the rank of maegashira 16. However, he suffered a narrow loss in his first tournament, achieving a 7-8 make-kochi record. In the following tournament of November, he managed to maintain his makuuchi rank due to the balance of promotion and demotion of other wrestlers. Even with a losing record, his performance received praises, notably from former yokozuna Kitanofuji, who praised his energy and his "unrivaled training enthusiasm". In the last tournament of 2022, he managed his first kachi-koshi in the top division by the twelfth day. He was listed as a potential Fighting spirit prize recipient but was shelved because he did not reach the majority of the attending committee members votes. In the first banzuke of 2023 Hiradoumi was ranked maegashira 10. He secured kachi-koshi at the January tournament on day 14 with a win over Kotoekō. Reaching his highest rank, Hiradoumi notably won his match against former ōzeki Takayasu on Day 8, but suffered a close losing record. After a good tournament in March 2023, Hiradoumi was promoted to Maegashira 5 for the July tournament of the same year. However, he suffered a negative record (make-koshi) and had to declare himself kyūjō for the final day of the tournament, having been seen limping after his fight against Abi.

During the November 2023 tournament, Hiradoumi stood out by recording a victory on Day 10 over Ichiyamamoto, the tournament's sole leader, jeopardizing his lead in the title race. The victory was also Hiradoumi's seventh in a row, having started the tournament with three defeats. During the 2024 March tournament, he stood out again by defeating Ōzeki Kirishima on Day 10. During the April 2024 tour, Hiradoumi received advice from Yokozuna Terunofuji during a training session, winning two of his seven matches. Terunofuji also commented that he had chosen Hiradoumi as his partner because he wanted to test motivated and dynamic wrestlers.

At the May 2024 tournament, Hiradoumi stood out by inflicting defeat on ōzeki Takakeishō (on Day 1) and on one of the tournament co-leaders, Ōnosato (Day 9), threatening his chances of winning the title. During the July tournament, Hiradoumi scored ten victories, beating higher-ranked wrestlers such as Kirishima and Ōnosato. For his performances, he won his first special prize (for Technique) and established a solid foundation for eventual promotion to the rank of ōzeki. Because of the balance of the banzuke, disturbed with the demotion of Takakeishō and the good performance of the four sekiwake of the time, Hiradoumi did not receive promotion, however, securing his status as komusubi.

In 2026, at the 50th edition of the Japan Grand Sumo Tournament, a one-day tournament held annually for professional sumo wrestlers at the Ryōgoku Kokugikan, Hiradoumi was awarded the Fighting Spirit prize, only having lost in semi-finals to eventual tournament champion yokozuna Hōshōryū.

== Fighting style ==
At the time of his promotion to makuuchi for 2022, Hiradoumi was described as a wrestler who never backs down and frequently uses pushing techniques. More specifically, his style consists mainly of quick, aggressive attacks and dodges aimed at overwhelming his opponent.

One of the wrestlers who inspires him most in his sumo style is Yokozuna Chiyonofuji, whose matches he watches to perfect his own style.

== Personal life ==
Hiradoumi has four brothers and sisters. He regularly cites his two youngest siblings as his driving force. Hiradoumi is an avid Central League baseball fan. He has been a fan of the Yomiuri Giants since childhood, and his favorite player is Kazuma Okamoto.

His favourite food is omurice.

== Career record ==
Hiradoumi Yūki
Year	January Hatsu basho, Tokyo	March Haru basho, Osaka	May Natsu basho, Tokyo	July Nagoya basho, Nagoya	September Aki basho, Tokyo	November Kyūshū basho, Fukuoka
2016	x	(Maezumō)	West Jonokuchi #19; 5–2	West Jonidan #62; Sat out due to injury 0–0–7	East Jonokuchi #22; 6–1	West Jonidan #41; 4–3
2017	East Jonidan #18; 2–5	East Jonidan #46; 5–2	East Jonidan #9; 4–3	East Sandanme #91; 3–4	West Jonidan #19; 3–4	East Jonidan #40; 6–1
2018	West Sandanme #74; 4–3	East Sandanme #55; 4–3	West Sandanme #40; 3–4	West Sandanme #55; 5–2	West Sandanme #29; 4–3	West Sandanme #16; 4–3
2019	West Sandanme #5; 4–3	West Makushita #55; 3–4	East Sandanme #1; 5–2	East Makushita #41; 2–5	West Sandanme #3; 5–2	East Makushita #45; 5–2
2020	West Makushita #30; 2–5	West Makushita #50; 5–2	East Makushita #34; Tournament Cancelled; State of Emergency; 0–0–0	East Makushita #34; 4–3	West Makushita #24; 5–2	West Makushita #13; 3–4
2021	East Makushita #19; 5–2	West Makushita #12; 5–2	West Makushita #6; 4–3	West Makushita #4; 4–3	East Makushita #2; 5–2	West Jūryō #13; 7–7–1
2022	East Jūryō #14; 8–7	East Jūryō #11; 7–8	East Jūryō #11; 8–7	East Jūryō #8; 10–5	West Maegashira #16; 7–8	West Maegashira #16; 10–5
2023	West Maegashira #10; 8–7	West Maegashira #9; 7–8	West Maegashira #9; 9–6	East Maegashira #5; 5–10	West Maegashira #8; 6–9	West Maegashira #11; 9–6
2024	West Maegashira #8; 8–7	West Maegashira #4; 9–6	East Maegashira #2; 9–6	West Komusubi #1; 10–5; T	West Komusubi #1; 7–8	West Maegashira #1; 4–11
2025	East Maegashira #5; 7–8	East Maegashira #6; 9–6	West Maegashira #3; 6–9	East Maegashira #5; 8–7	East Maegashira #4; 8–7	East Maegashira #3; 4–11
2026	East Maegashira #6; 9–6	East Maegashira #3; 7–8	East Maegashira #3; 7–8	East Maegashira #3; 4–11	West Maegashira #8; 9–6	East Maegashira #5; 4–11
Record given as wins–losses–absences Top division champion Top division runner-up Retired Non-participation Jūryō Lower divisions Sanshō key: F=Fighting spirit; O=Outstanding performance; T=Technique Also shown: ★=Kinboshi; P=Playoff(s); Divisions: Makuuchi — Jūryō — Makushita — Sandanme — Jonidan — Jonokuchi Makuuchi ranks: Yokozuna — Ōzeki — Sekiwake — Komusubi — Maegashira

== Media appearances ==
- Sumo: Spirit Weighs Nothing

== See also ==
- Glossary of sumo terms
- List of active sumo wrestlers
- List of active special prize winners
- List of komusubi
