= Terunofuji Haruo =

Mongolian-Japanese sumo wrestler

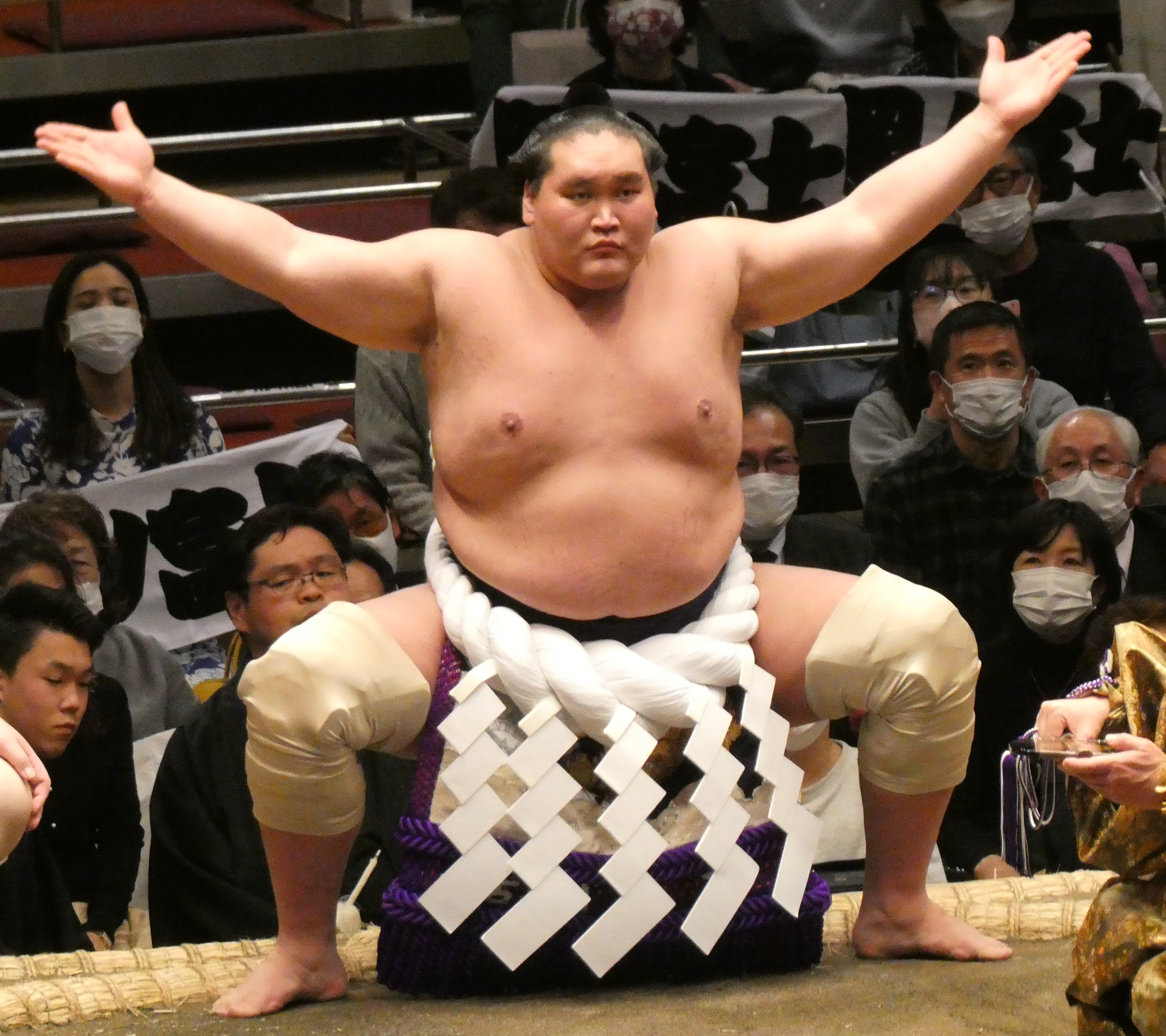
- Terunofuji in January 2022

Personal information
- Native name: 照ノ富士 春雄
- Born: Gantulgyn Gan-Erdene; 29 November 1991 (age 34) Ulaanbaatar, Mongolian People's Republic
- Height: 1.92 m (6 ft 3 1/2 in)
- Weight: 176 kg (388 lb; 27.7 st)

Sport
- Sport: Sumo
- Retired: January 2025
- Heya: Magaki→Isegahama
- Record: 523-275-231
- Debut: May 2011
- Highest rank: Yokozuna (July 2021)
- Elder name: Isegahama
- Championships: 10 (Makuuchi); 2 (Jūryō); 1 (Makushita)
- Special Prizes: Fighting Spirit (3); Outstanding Performance (3); Technique (3)
- Updated on 16 January 2025

Terunofuji Haruo (Japanese: 照ノ富士 春雄; born 29 November 1991 as Gantulgyn Gan-Erdene (Mongolian: Гантулгын Ган-Эрдэнэ)) is a Mongolian-Japanese former professional sumo wrestler. The 73rd yokozuna of the sport, he wrestled for Isegahama stable. After his retirement in 2025, he took on the name Isegahama himself and managed his stable as stablemaster

He entered professional sumo in January 2011 and took the second division jūryō championship in his debut as a sekitori in September 2013. He took the top makuuchi division championship in May 2015, only 25 tournaments after his professional debut. This earned him promotion to sumo's second-highest rank of ōzeki.

Terunofuji then suffered from knee injuries and other health problems. Surviving kadoban status (in danger of demotion from the rank of ōzeki) on three previous occasions, he was finally demoted after the September 2017 tournament. After a long injury layoff he fell to the second-lowest jonidan division in March 2019 and staged a successful comeback and returned to the makuuchi division the following year, the first wrestler to do so from such a low rank. Terunofuji won his return tournament in the top division in July 2020. He earned his second promotion to ōzeki following a third championship win in March 2021, which he immediately followed with another tournament championship in May 2021. Following a runner-up performance in the July 2021 tournament, he was promoted to become the sport's 73rd yokozuna. He acquired Japanese citizenship the following month, taking the name Seizan Suginomori (杉野森 正山). Following the retirement of fellow Mongolian Hakuhō in September 2021, Terunofuji became the only active yokozuna, a position he continued to hold alone until his retirement in January 2025.

Overall, he has ten top division championships, has been runner-up in seven tournaments, and has nine special prizes. Sumo commentator John Gunning called Terunofuji's comeback "a tale unparalleled in sumo history."

== Early life and sumo background ==
In childhood, Gan-Erdene was coached in judo by Jigjidiin Mönkhbat, the father of yokozuna Hakuhō, but Mönkhbat saw in him a predisposition for sumo and helped arrange for him to move to Japan as a student at Tottori Jōhoku High School to join its well-known sumo program. Future top division wrestler Ichinojō travelled with him and joined the same school. He continued his rivalry with Ichinojō into the professional ranks, remarking in 2015, "What matters is who will make it to the ozeki rank first." As a third year student, Gan-Erdene's team took the championship at a national inter-high school sumo tournament.

== Career ==
=== Early career ===
Upon graduating, Gan-Erdene chose to turn professional and joined Magaki stable. He entered the ring in the same tournament as soon to be well-known Chiyotairyū and Jōkōryū. Upon entering he was given the shikona surname of Wakamishō (若三勝). From his first pro tournament in July 2011 he excelled, posting only three losses in three tournaments and spending only one tournament in each of the lower divisions of jonokuchi, jonidan and sandanme. In his sandanme tournament in November 2011, he had a perfect 7–0 record and participated in a playoff for the championship, which he lost to the aforementioned Jōkōryū, then still known as Sakumayama. From his third division makushita debut in January 2012, he had three consecutive 5–2 records before posting two consecutive losing tournaments in July and September 2012, the only two of his career up to that point. He bounced back from this in the following November tournament, garnering a 4–3 record. For the next four tournaments his success continued and he never had more than two losses in any tournament. During the period, his stable closed, and he transferred to Isegahama stable. He had become frustrated with a lack of training opportunities at the small Magaki stable, as with the ill health of his stablemaster and various scandals there were sometimes no other coaches or wrestlers present. At Isegahama by contrast he was able to practice with many higher ranked wrestlers to improve his technique. His 6–1 record at makushita 4 in July 2013 was enough to earn him promotion to the salaried ranks of jūryō in September 2013.

Upon entering jūryō he changed his shikona surname to Terunofuji, a combination of two former yokozuna, Terukuni and Asahifuji (his own stablemaster), and a reflection of the high expectations placed on him. He took the jūryō championship in his debut tournament, beating future maegashira Kagamiō on the last day to even their records and forcing a playoff bout against Kagamiō, which he also won. An 8–7 record in the following November tournament and a 12–3 record in the January 2014 tournament earned him promotion to the top makuuchi division in March 2014.

=== Makuuchi division ===
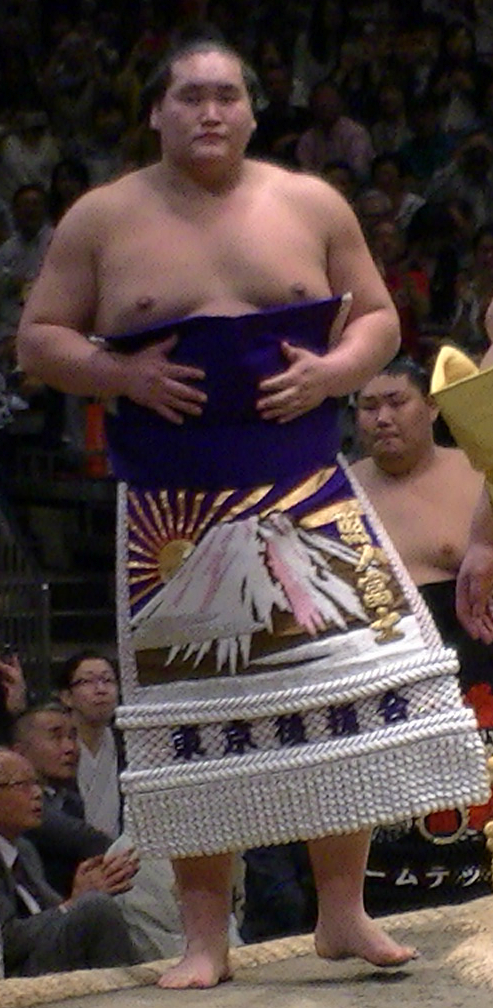
Terunofuji during the September 2014 tournament

In his makuuchi division debut he had only a 2–7 record on the 9th day. However, from then on he won six straight bouts in six days to pull out a kachi-koshi or winning tournament. Then in the following May tournament he started out with an unpromising 4–6 record, but then won 5 straight to finish with a strong showing of 9–6. Two tournaments later in the September 2014 tournament at maegashira 1 he was up against top notch competition, including several san'yaku or titled wrestlers, and he only managed to eke out a 6–9 record. This was only his third make-koshi or losing record in a tournament in his career and his first in the salaried rank. He only fell to maegashira 2 though, being helped by bad showings from several other wrestlers. It was in this tournament in November 2014 that he truly began to show his mettle in the top division; after going only 4–6, he beat an ōzeki and two sekiwake in the last 5 days to pull off an 8–7. In January 2015, he defeated the ōzeki Gōeidō and Kisenosato, the sekiwake Aoiyama and both active komusubi on the way to an 8–7 record. He was awarded the Fighting Spirit Prize, or kantosho, his first special prize.

He was promoted to the rank of sekiwake for the next tournament. In the March Grand Tournament of 2015, he remained unbeaten for the first half of the tournament, scoring a seventh victory over Tochinoshin. These seven wins in a row, achieved in his first san'yaku-ranked tournament, make Terunofuji the first wrestler in 75 years to achieve this feat, since Itsutsushima at the May 1940 tournament. Terunofuji then defeated yokozuna Hakuhō (unbeaten in his last 36 matches), and finished runner-up with a 13–2 record, having also defeated both komusubi as well as the ōzeki Gōeidō and Kotoshōgiku. He received his second Fighting Spirit Prize and was also awarded the prize for Outstanding Performance. After his final contest he said "I'll shoot for double-digit wins at the next tournament and hopefully that will lead to victory. Now I just want to take a long rest". In May Terunofuji was beaten on the opening day of the Natsu basho by Sadanoumi, but won his next seven including victories over both komusubi and the ōzeki Kotoshōgiku. After defeats by Tokushōryū on day nine and Hakuhō on day eleven he recovered to win his next three matches including victories over Kisenosato and the sekiwake Myōgiryū to enter the final day in a tie for first place with Hakuhō. In his final match he defeated the Bulgarian maegashira Aoiyama by yori-kiri or force-out, and then saw Hakuhō lose to Harumafuji. The result was that Terunofuji, in his eighth top-division tournament, was handed his first championship with a 12–3 record and was awarded the Fighting Spirit Prize for the third time. Terunofuji admitted that he had been "almost in tears" at the conclusion of the tournament and said, "When I was 15 years old I watched sumo and wanted to become a sumo wrestler and so came to Japan. It was a dream of mine to win the championship. To actually win it is like a dream." A few days after the tournament, Terunofuji's official promotion to ōzeki was announced in a press conference. He was the first to be promoted to ōzeki having previously spent only two tournaments in san'yaku since Yoshibayama 64 years earlier. As Yoshibayama's promotion came before the six-tournaments per year system, Terunofuji was the first to be promoted after only four months in san'yaku.

Following Terunofuji's first top division yūshō, Japan Times columnist Mark Buckton suggested that he had the potential to be promoted one day to the highest rank of yokozuna.

=== Ōzeki ===
On his first appearance at his new rank Terunofuji won nine of his first ten matches to reach a tie for the lead, but losses to Hakuhō, Kakuryū and Kotoshōgiku saw him end the tournament with an 11–4 record. In September he won his first eleven matches to establish a clear lead over the opposition, but then lost to Tochiōzan and Kisenosato, sustaining a knee injury in the latter match. Another loss to Gōeidō saw him enter the final day with eleven wins, one behind the yokozuna Kakuryū. In the final scheduled match on day 15 Terunofuji defeated Kakuryū to level their scores but lost the ensuing play-off. Terunofuji's knee injury continued to trouble him in November but he posted nine wins including victories over the yokozuna Kakuryū and Hakuhō.

The year 2016 was a hard one for Terunofuji, with the lack of strength and flexibility in his knees affecting his performances. He was kadoban, or danger of relegation from ōzeki three times, but was able to hold on to his rank each time by getting a winning record in the following tournament. In January he won three of his first five bouts before withdrawing from the tournament with a broken right collar bone and damaged meniscus in his left knee, after a bout with Kyokushūhō. This was the first withdrawal of his career. He underwent arthroscopic surgery on his left knee shortly afterwards. Despite his injury problems he announced that he would contest the next tournament in March, where he was kadoban, or in danger of demotion from ōzeki rank. In March, Terunofuji still seemed well below his best but maintained his rank with eight wins. In May, however, his form slumped as he lost his last thirteen matches to end with a career-worst record of 2–13. He just managed to preserve his rank on the final day of the following Nagoya tournament by defeating Kaisei for an 8–7 record, but was kadoban yet again after recording only four wins in September. In November 2016 he was kadoban and under danger of demotion if he failed to secure at least eight wins in the tournament. Things didn't start off on the right foot as he lost his first two matches, however things took a turn as he proceeded to win the next seven in a row including a win over fellow ōzeki Kotoshōgiku. Terunofuji then had two losses against Kakuryū and Gōeidō, but was able to get his winning record on day 12 against Hakuhō which erased his kadoban status and secured his rank. Terunofuji finished out the year with three losses and ended the tournament with an 8–7 record.

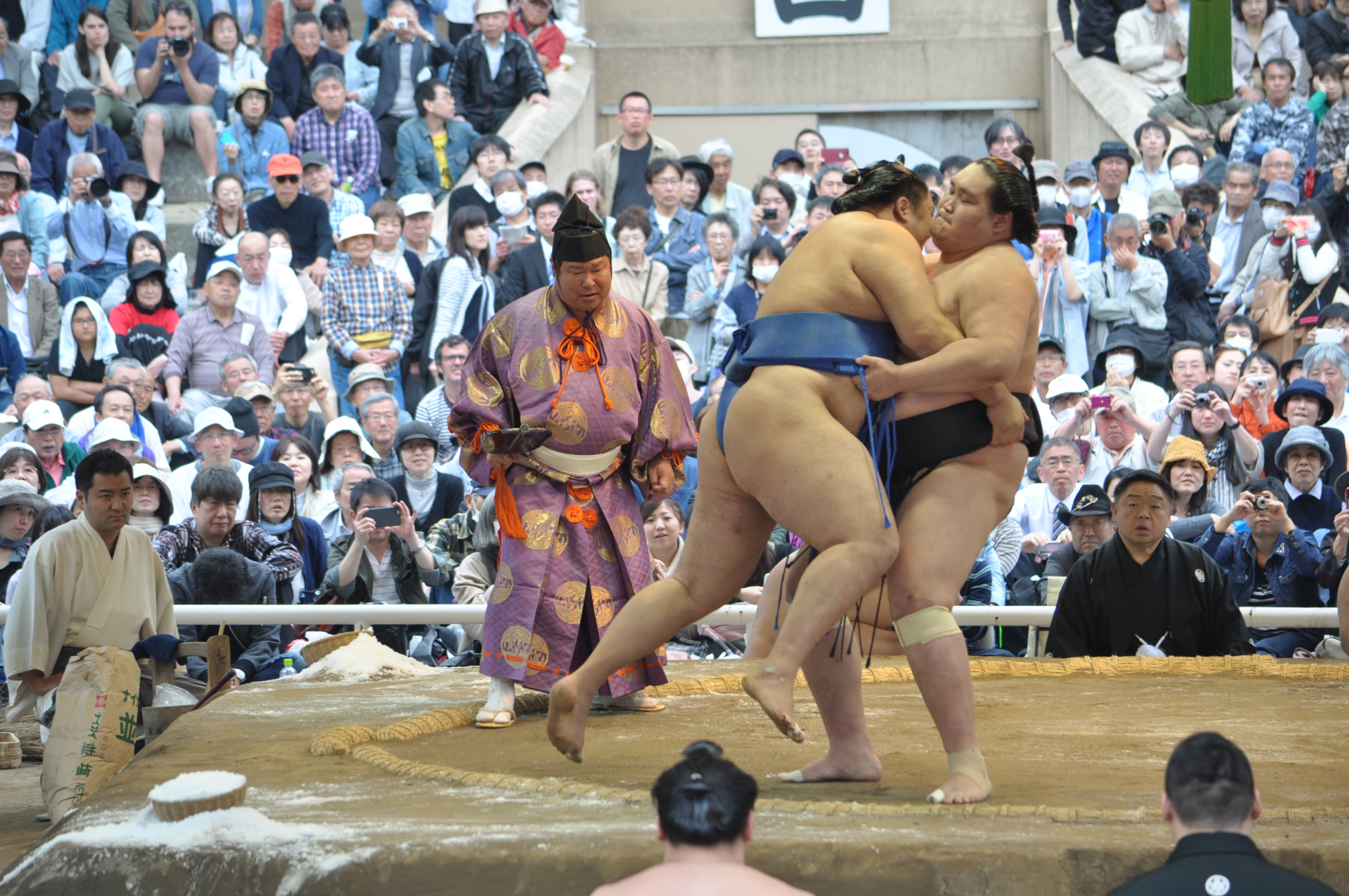
Terunofuji (right) defeating Tamawashi in an April 2017 exhibition bout

In the January 2017 tournament Terunofuji managed only four wins, making him kadoban for the fourth time. The Osaka tournament in March saw a dramatic return to form as he won his first five matches before losing to Takayasu, and then won his next seven to take a share of the lead with a win over Kakuryū on Day 13. On Day 14 he became the sole leader after he defeated Kotoshōgiku and the injured Kisenosato lost to Kakuryū, but he was booed by the crowd for sidestepping his opponent at the initial charge. He missed out on his second championship on the final day as he was defeated twice by Kisenosato, once in their regulation match and again in the resulting playoff. The Japan Sumo Association was questioned by the government after the tournament when media reports suggested that Terunofuji was subjected to hate speech taunts from the crowd after his controversial win over Kotoshōgiku, with the expression "Go back to Mongolia" reportedly used.

Terunofuji underwent endoscopic surgery on his left knee after the May 2017 tournament, but did not recover as well as expected. He entered the Nagoya tournament in July but withdrew after four losses in the first five days, citing a meniscal injury to the knee. The September tournament saw a repeat of Nagoya, with Terunofuji winning only one of his first five matches before he was forced to withdraw because of the knee injury, which he aggravated in a loss to Shōhōzan on Day 5. Having failed to record a winning score in two consecutive tournaments he lost his ōzeki status after 14 tournaments at the rank.

=== Injuries, demotion and comeback ===
Terunofuji could have made an immediate return to ōzeki with at least ten wins in the November 2017 tournament, but he withdrew on Day 5 after losing his first four matches, citing a meniscus tear in his left knee. He withdrew from the January 2018 tournament on Day 3 after losing his first two bouts, due to a viscera disorder, and was demoted to jūryō as a result. He is the fourth former ōzeki to fall to jūryō and the first since Baruto in 2013. In March 2018 he completed a tournament for the first time since May of the previous year but could only score six wins against nine losses from jūryō 5. He withdrew from the May 2018 tournament on Day 4, but returned from Day 11 in an attempt to stave off demotion to makushita. His stablemaster reported that in addition to diabetes and knee problems he was also suffering from kidney stones. However he failed to win any matches on his return and was demoted to makushita. He was the first ōzeki and first top division tournament winner to fall to that division. He had surgery on both knees on 25 June and withdrew from the July 2018 tournament, with his stablemaster indicating he wanted Terunofuji to have his knees healed properly before competing again. He was also absent for the next three tournaments, which caused him to fall to the second-lowest jonidan division. He returned to competition in March 2019 and won all seven of his matches, although he lost a playoff for the jonidan championship to Mongolian-Russian wrestler Rōga. This was his first appearance since May 2018, and his first winning record since May 2017. In his next three tournaments he lost just one bout in each, progressing to makushita 10 by November 2019. In the Kyushu tournament he won the makushita championship with a perfect 7–0 record, ensuring his return to the sekitori ranks.

In his first tournament as a sekitori since May 2018, Terunofuji won his second consecutive yūshō by clinching the jūryō championship on Day 13 of the January tournament with 13 straight wins. He lost his final two matches to Nishikigi and Daiamami, ending any outside hopes of immediate promotion back to makuuchi, and was ranked at jūryō 3 for the March 2020 tournament.

=== Return to makuuchi ===
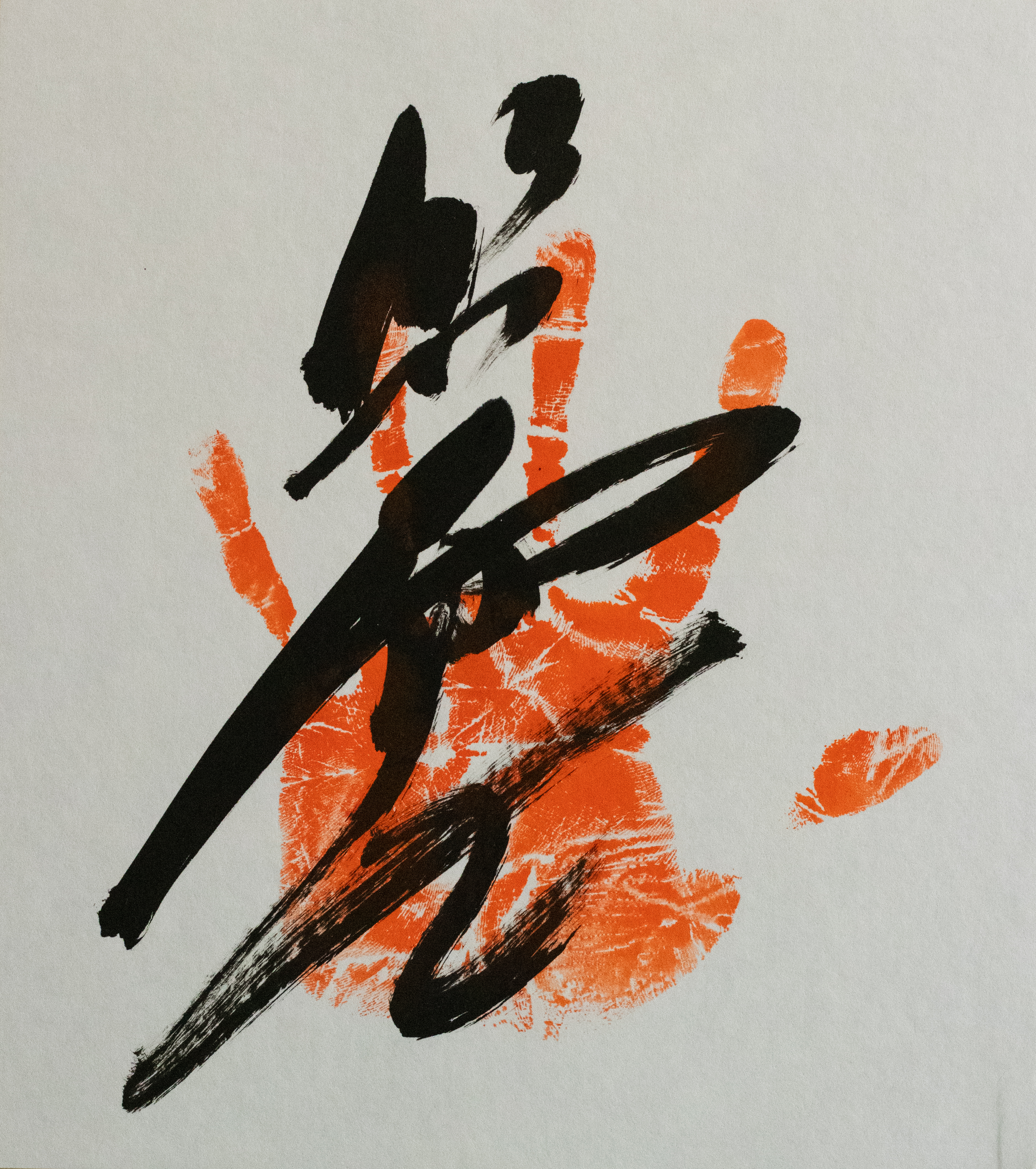
Terunofuji tegata (handprint and signature)

In the March tournament, Terunofuji finished with a 10–5 record and earned promotion back to makuuchi, after 14 tournaments outside the top division. He is the first top division wrestler to fall to jonidan and successfully return to makuuchi. After the May basho was cancelled due to COVID-19, Terunofuji continued his comeback in the July tournament by winning his second top-division yūshō with a 13–2 record. He secured the championship by defeating sekiwake Mitakeumi on the final day and also won the Technique and Outstanding Performance prizes as well. The 30 tournaments between this victory and his previous yūshō in May 2015 is the second longest gap between top division championships after Kotonishiki's 43. Speaking to reporters online following his victory, Terunofuji thanked his stablemaster, who convinced him to keep working on healing himself when Terunofuji had asked for permission to retire. In the September 2020 tournament from maegashira 1 Terunofuji secured a winning record with eight wins, before withdrawing on Day 13 with a left knee injury. He returned to the san'yaku ranks for the first time in three years at the November 2020 tournament. This was the first time he had been ranked as a komusubi.

Terunofuji continued to perform well at the November 2020 basho, going into the final day with a 12–2 record. This score put him one win behind ōzeki Takakeishō in the yūshō race. Terunofuji faced Takakeishō on the final day, defeating him and bringing their scores level to force a yūshō playoff. However, Takakeishō won the playoff and claimed the championship. For his efforts, Terunofuji was awarded the ginō-shō or technique prize at the tournament's conclusion. He was the runner-up again in January 2021 at the sekiwake rank, when he defeated both the active ōzeki and secured another ginō-shō.

=== Return to ōzeki ===
Terunofuji acknowledged before the March 2021 tournament that he would need a three basho total of 33 wins to be considered for ōzeki promotion and that he would "fight hard." His own stablemaster, Isegahama (former yokozuna Asahifuji), was the head of the refereeing department at the time and in charge of drawing up the rankings. With his fellow Mongolians Hakuhō and Kakuryū withdrawn due to injury, Terunofuji won his third career yūshō and earned his third shukun-shō, finishing with a 12–3 record – more than the 10 wins needed for an expected promotion to ōzeki once again. He is the first wrestler to win three top division championships from a rank below ōzeki. Terunofuji later told reporters that barely qualifying for promotion to the sport's second-highest rank was not enough, as he felt that his stablemaster's reputation was on the line. The Sumo Association unanimously approved his promotion on 31 March. He accepted "with great humility" when informed by JSA representatives at Isegahama stable. He later reiterated his gratitude to his stablemaster, adding that he would devote himself to training and aim higher.

In May 2021 he won his first ten bouts, leading the rest of the field by two victories, but suffered a hansoku or loss by disqualification on Day 11 when he was determined by the ringside judges to have pulled Myōgiryū's topknot. He suffered another defeat to Endō on Day 14, but remained the leader. He won his fourth championship after defeating fellow ōzeki Takakeishō in a playoff, having lost to him in their regulation match. He became the first person since the kadoban system was introduced in July 1969 to win the Emperor's Cup immediately after returning to the ōzeki rank.

=== Promotion to yokozuna ===
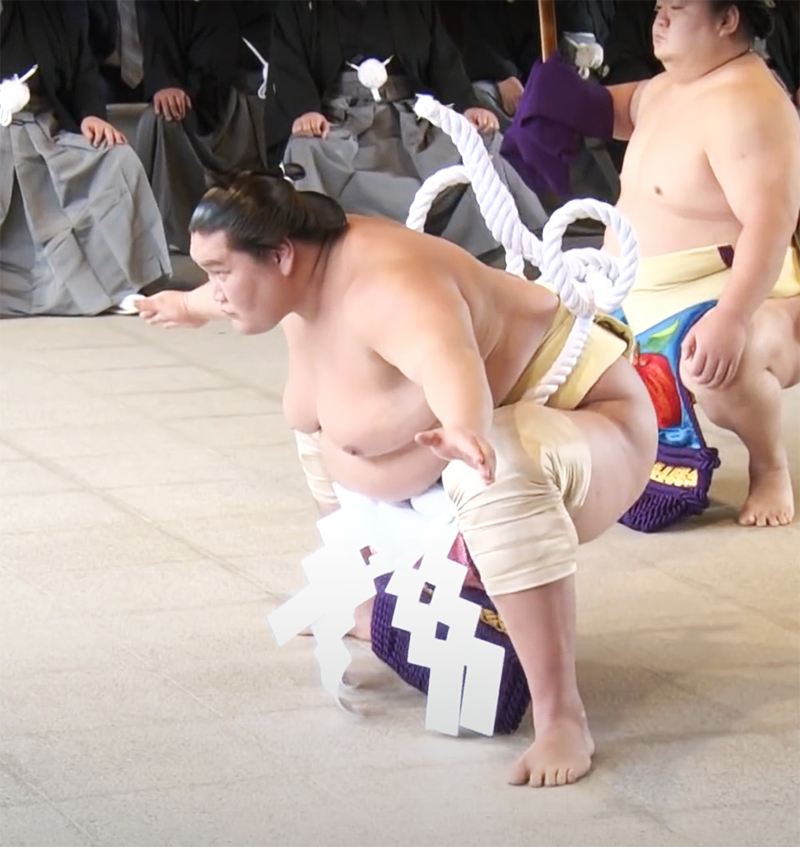
Terunofuji performing the yokozuna dohyō-iri ceremony at Meiji Shrine, August 2021

In the July 2021 tournament, Terunofuji was in contention for the Emperor's Cup with a perfect record after 14 days before losing in the final match to fellow Mongolian-born yokozuna Hakuhō, who won the championship with a perfect 15–0 record. This was their first meeting in four years, and only the sixth time in sumo history that two wrestlers had fought on the final day with undefeated records. Despite missing out on the championship, Terunofuji's performance over the last three tournaments — 38 victories, with a top division championship at the sekiwake rank followed by a championship and a runner-up performance at the ōzeki rank — was enough for the Sumo Association to call for an extraordinary meeting to discuss Terunofuji's promotion to become the sport's 73rd yokozuna, the first yokozuna of the Reiwa Era. This completed Terunofuji's historic comeback after dropping from the second-highest ōzeki rank to the second-lowest jonidan division. He is only the second rikishi in history who was demoted from the rank of ōzeki but still managed the promotion to yokozuna, the only other one being Mienoumi in 1979, and is also only the fourth rikishi who got promoted to yokozuna after only two tournaments after promotion to ōzeki, after Tochigiyama in 1918, Futabayama in 1937, and Terukuni in 1942. At 29 years and 7 months, he is also the sixth oldest rikishi to be promoted to yokozuna.

The Yokozuna Deliberation Council recommended Terunofuji's promotion on 19 July, and the Sumo Association formally approved the promotion on 21 July. In his acceptance speech, Terunofuji said he would hold on to his "unshakeable spirit and aim to foster greater dignity and power as a yokozuna." Later, he told reporters that he wanted to have a more determined mindset in sumo, adding that he wanted to understand what it means to be a yokozuna and be a role model to others.

Terunofuji adopted the Shiranui style used by his stablemaster Isegahama and took part in his first dohyō-iri (ring-entering ceremony) as a yokozuna on 24 August at Meiji Shrine in Tokyo. Due to the coronavirus pandemic, the ceremony was delayed by one month after his promotion. The ceremony was closed to the public, but the Sumo Association streamed the event on YouTube. Stablemates Terutsuyoshi and Takarafuji served as the tsuyuharai (dew sweeper) and tachimochi (sword bearer), respectively, and Terunofuji borrowed the tachi used for the ceremony from his stablemaster. In preparation for his first tournament as yokozuna, Terunofuji received a tachi from the sumo club supporters' association of Johoku High School (his former school). According to the supporter's association, the tachi was made in 1576 and is about one meter long.

=== Yokozuna career ===
==== 2021 ====
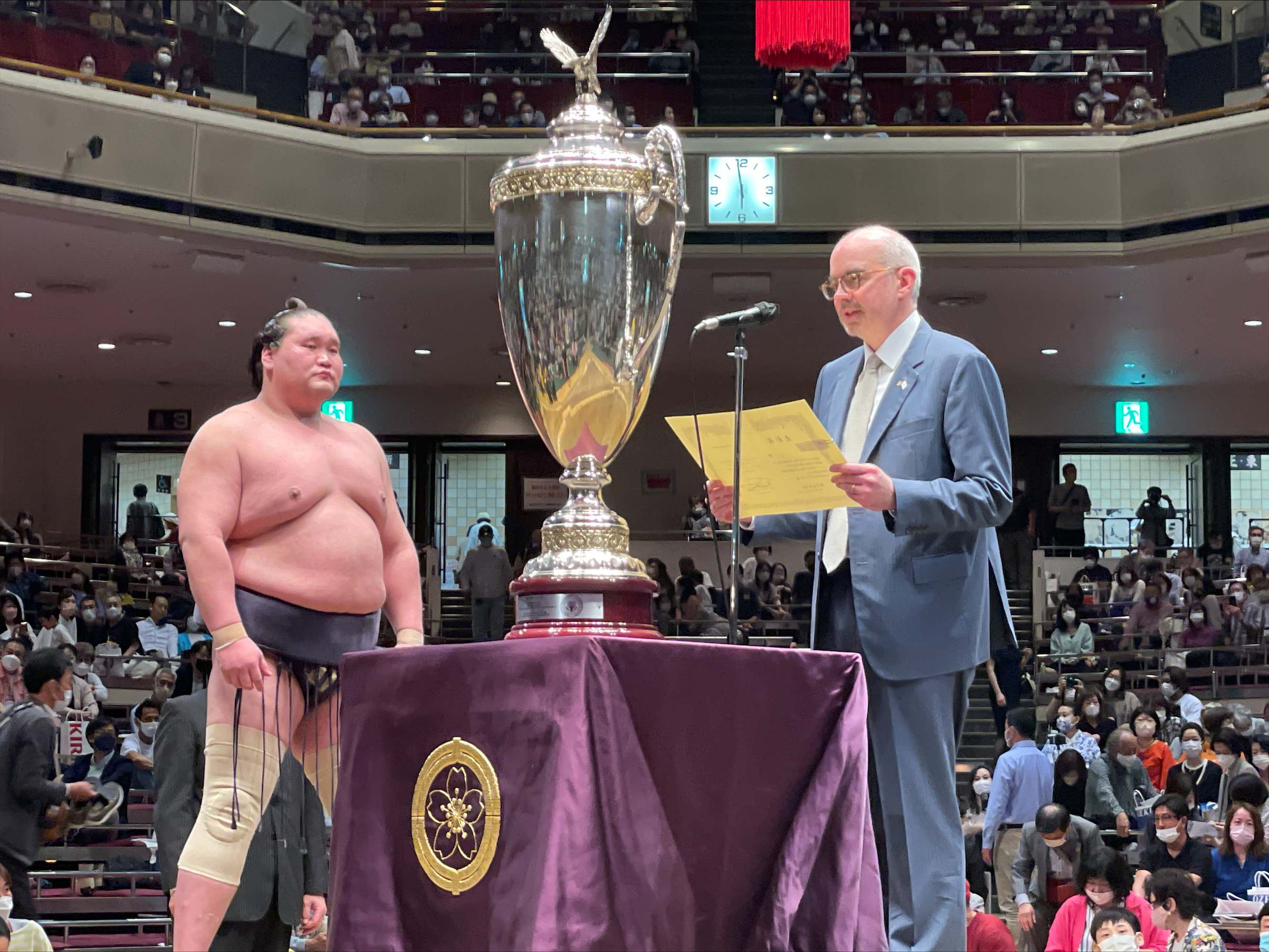
Terunofuji receives the President's Cup in May 2022

Terunofuji won his first sumo tournament as a yokozuna in September 2021 with a 13–2 record. Hakuhō's retirement was formalized soon after the tournament ended, leaving Terunofuji as sumo's only yokozuna. Terunofuji's sixth career championship in makuuchi was assured on Day 14 of the November 2021 tournament after he defeated Abi, who had been the only other wrestler in contention for the Emperor's Cup at that time. He would end up defeating Takakeishō on the final day for his first perfect record in makuuchi. Terunofuji was humble during his public interview, appreciating the support of fans in Kyushu who did not see last year's November tournament because of COVID-19 and saying that he was "not such a talented wrestler capable of doing many things." Terunofuji became the first sumo wrestler to win his first two tournaments at the yokozuna rank since Taihō, who accomplished the feat in January 1962. He was also the first wrestler to win four tournaments in a year since Hakuhō in 2014.

==== 2022 ====
In January 2022 Terunofuji's performance was somewhat hampered by knee injuries and he lost to Mitakeumi in a title-decider on the final day to finish on 11–4, two wins off the pace. In February 2022 the Sumo Association announced that, along with a number of other high-ranking wrestlers, he had tested positive for COVID-19. He missed ten days of training as a result.

Terunofuji withdrew on Day 6 of the March 2022 tournament in Osaka citing issues with his right heel and left knee, both of which he had injured in the past. The issues would require about one month of treatment, according to a medical certificate submitted to the Sumo Association. Terunofuji's withdrawal came after he was defeated by Daieishō and, for the second straight tournament, Tamawashi. It was his first kyūjō since his promotion to sumo's highest rank.

At the May 2022 Natsu tournament in Tokyo, Terunofuji overcame early losses to clinch the tournament with a 12–3 record. He avoided what would have been a four-way playoff with Daieishō, Takanoshō and Sadanoumi by beating Mitakeumi on the final day. In an online press conference the following day, he spoke of his relief at his victory and paid tribute to his former Isegahama stablemate Aminishiki ahead of his retirement ceremony, who Terunofuji said had given him advice on how to deal with his knee injuries.

In July, Terunofuji was in contention for the championship on the final day but his defeat to Takakeishō meant he finished on 11–4, one win behind maegashira Ichinojō who took the title with a 12–3 record.

In the September 2022 tournament Terunofuji pulled out on Day 10, having already given away four kinboshi, due to injuries to both knees. This was the 13th withdrawal of his career, and his second since becoming yokozuna. In a telephone interview, his stable master Asahifuji Seiya said Terunofuji had been diagnosed with osteoarthritis in both knees and bone contusion in the right knee, which was "completely out of alignment". Isegahama said, "He needs to heal properly, not just rest. In some cases, surgery will be necessary. I think the inflammation will stop in a few days, but after that, I have to think carefully about what to do." Terunofuji had surgery on both knees on October 18, with his stablemaster indicating he would not return to competition until fully healed. On 11 November he formally withdrew from the November tournament in Fukuoka.

==== 2023 ====
On the January 2023 banzuke Terunofuji was designated as yokozuna-ōzeki because there was just one wrestler (Takakeishō) listed at the ōzeki rank. He withdrew from the tournament, however, in order to continue recovering from the surgery on his knees. He withdrew again in March after stablemaster Isegahama suggested that there was "still something missing" upon observing Terunofuji's training.

Terunofuji appeared for the first time since his September 2022 withdrawal as a part-time participant in the April 2023 regional sumo tours, called jungyō. He competed in–and won–the jungyō tournament for makuuchi wrestlers on 15 April in Fujisawa. A couple of days later, he confirmed his intention to return to action at the May 2023 tournament in Tokyo.

Terunofuji was the leader of the makuuchi championship race throughout the May 2023 tournament. He became the sole leader after Day 12, when former ōzeki Asanoyama suffered his second defeat. On Day 14 Terunofuji won his eighth top division championship by defeating sekiwake Kiribayama, thereby securing a two-win advantage over his competitors with one day remaining. He finished the tournament with a 14-1 record, his best since the November 2021 tournament. His only loss was dealt by Meisei on Day 9. His victory was the first makuuchi championship won by a wrestler who had been absent for three successive tournaments in 34 years, the last being Sumo Association president Hakkaku (former yokozuna Hokutoumi). His victory also meant that he had won at least one top-division championship for four consecutive years since his comeback to the makuuchi division. Upon clinching the championship, Terunofuji stated that he did not want to waste a single day since his surgery in October. Terunofuji's exclusive trainer, Hidejima Masayoshi, expressed his joy, saying, "I genuinely wanted him to finish the tournament without any injuries. It's an amazing comeback. I believed he would be able to demonstrate absolute yokozuna sumo for another year."

Terunofuji withdrew from the July 2023 tournament on Day 4 after conceding back-to-back gold stars to top maegashira competitors Nishikigi and Tobizaru. Following the latter match he was seen with his hands on the shoulders of one of his assistants as he departed back to the locker room. His medical certificate stated that he would need a month of rest due to a herniated disc and vertebral endplate issues. It was Terunofuji's sixth withdrawal out of the last ten tournaments. Following the announcement of the rankings for the September tournament, Terunofuji expressed his reservations about taking part in the competition, although his presence remained a possibility if his back problems eased. Terunofuji eventually withdrew from the September tournament, which marked his seventh kyūjō since his yokozuna promotion. His stablemaster Isegahama said that although Terunofuji's muscles and knees were in great condition, he would need about a month of treatment for lower back pain. The official medical certificate noted that Terunofuji was being treated for a lumbar disc herniation and symptoms of diabetes.

In preparation for the Autumn regional tour, Terunofuji offered clarification on the state of his back, nevertheless withdrawing from the first week of the tour to continue treatment, while ruling out surgery in order to compete at the Kyūshū tournament. By his own admission, the state of his back made training impossible, but Terunofuji was optimistic about the continuation of his career, taking part in the danpatsu-shiki of former sekiwake Okinoumi and performing his ring-entering ceremony at the Meiji Shrine on October 2. The day before planning to rejoin the regional tour, it was reported that part of Terunofuji's hip bone had previously been broken.

Terunofuji withdrew again before the start of the November 2023 tournament, one day after cutting his practice short at his stable's lodging in Fukuoka in order to treat lower back pain. It was his eighth withdrawal since yokozuna promotion, and also meant that he would complete 2023 having participated in just one tournament for the full 15 days. After the November 2023 tournament, the Yokozuna Deliberation Council requested that Terunofuji compete at the following tournament in January. They indicated that they would make a comment should he not compete, which could include issuing a formal notice.

==== 2024 ====
At the dohyō-iri held at Meiji Shrine prior to the start of the January 2024 tournament, Terunofuji said he was ready for his return to the ring and that he wanted to take up sumo to shake off the dark news—referring to the Noto Peninsula earthquake and the aircraft collision at Haneda Airport that occurred in Japan at the beginning of the year—and make good news. During this tournament, Terunofuji recorded the five-hundredth victory of his career by defeating Maegashira Ryūden on Day 8. On Day 13, he defeated tournament leader Kotonowaka to remain among the three tied wrestlers still in the running for the title (along with Kotonowaka and Ōzeki Kirishima). On the final day, Terunofuji won his match against Kirishima to escape a three-way playoff situation. He then faced and defeated Kotonowaka who qualified for a playoff, winning his ninth championship title in the process.

At the March 2024 tournament Terunofuji started poorly, losing four of his first six matches—the first time that has happened since his yokozuna promotion. This included three consecutive gold stars conceded to lower-ranked maegashira competitors, the first such instance in professional sumo in 4 1/2 years. Terunofuji withdrew on Day 7, marking his ninth withdrawal from a grand sumo tournament since his rise to the yokozuna rank. His medical certificate cited lumbar disc disease, requiring two weeks of treatment. Stablemaster Isegahama commented that the condition of his lower back was not good, adding that the goal was to continue treatment and recover for the next tournament in May. Isegahama also ruled out surgery, stating that Terunofuji would not be able to compete anymore if that were to happen.

Prior to the start of the May 2024 tournament Terunofuji appeared at an open training session at the Ryōgoku Kokugikan, but did not enter the sumo ring to train like the others did. Terunofuji decided to participate in the tournament after there was some uncertainty, and sumo officials assigned him to face new komusubi Ōnosato. Terunofuji was defeated, however, losing to the 23-year-old by sukuinage, or beltless arm throw. Terunofuji withdrew from the tournament on the following day, with his medical certificate stating that he would need treatment for damaged costal cartilage in his left rib as well as osteoarthritis in his right knee. Following the May tournament, Yokozuna Deliberation Council chairman Masayuki Yamauchi said that the council would see over the following tournaments in July and September how Terunofuji would recover from his injury and his determination to return to competition. Yamauchi also appreciated Terunofuji's fighting spirit for his efforts to compete in May.

In the July 2024 tournament Terunofuji started out strong, taking the sole lead on Day 4 and opening up a two-win advantage on Day 6. He suffered his first loss of the tournament at the hands of new sekiwake Ōnosato on Day 11. He then suffered two more defeats on the last two days to finish in a tie at 12 wins with his Day 14 opponent, maegashira Takanoshō, who had earned his third career kinboshi against Terunofuji. In the playoff Terunofuji defeated Takanoshō, clinching his tenth championship in the top division. It marked his first makuuchi title won in Nagoya; he also won the July tournament in 2020, but that tournament was moved from Nagoya to Tokyo because of the coronavirus pandemic. Terunofuji later told reporters that the July 2024 tournament featured the strongest wrestlers he had ever seen compete. Regarding his own progress, he said: "There are moments when I wonder if I might be at my strongest now, but unlike in the past, I have no definite conviction that I can win whether it be at training or the tournament." Sumo commentator John Gunning suggested that with ten top-division titles under his belt, Terunofuji should be referred to as the dai-yokozuna, or great grand champion, of the Reiwa era.

Continuing to suffer health issues, Terunofuji told reporters at the end of the August regional tours that he had lost about 10 kilograms of weight. At an open practice at his stable on 4 September, Terunofuji was seen performing only basic sumo exercises. Stablemaster Isegahama hinted at Terunofuji's condition at the time, saying that one could tell just by looking at him. Two days later Terunofuji pulled out of the September 2024 tournament. It was later reported that Terunofuji had injured his left knee near the end of the tour, and was since unable to practice at the stable. Although he was able to perform the dohyō-iri during a portion of the October regional tours, he reportedly was unable to resume training when his stable moved to Fukuoka for the November 2024 tournament. He subsequently withdrew from that tournament, marking his twelfth absence in 20 tournaments at the rank of yokozuna. Masayuki Yamauchi of the Yokozuna Deliberation Council stated after the tournament that the council was not considering any action against Terunofuji, saying that they would continue to take a wait-and-see approach.

== Final tournament and coaching career ==
In early 2025, Terunofuji (still the only yokozuna at the time) confirmed his presence for the first tournament of the year, despite numerous comments calling for his retirement after only a handful of appearances in the annual competitions. Terunofuji, however, suffered a quick loss to Wakatakakage on the opening day of the tournament. Although he was able to get consecutive wins on the second and third days of the competition, he ultimately withdrew on 16 January–one day after conceding a gold star to Tobizaru–for his 13th absence at sumo's highest rank. Explaining the yokozuna's decision to withdraw from competition, his master Isegahama (the former Asahifuji) explained that Terunofuji had awakened chronic pain in his lower back and knees, the latter reportedly swollen to the point of not being able to close completely.

Later that same day Japanese media outlets, citing sources within the Japan Sumo Association, reported that Terunofuji had decided to retire after a long battle with knee pain and diabetes. The Sumo Association made Terunofuji's retirement official the following day, on 17 January 2025. The only wrestler to occupy the highest rank in the hierarchy, Terunofuji's retirement had left the sport without a grand champion for the first time since the March 1993 tournament, when Akebono was promoted to the supreme rank and occupied the position left vacant since Hokutoumi's retirement in May 1992; as Terunofuji had continued to remain on the banzuke for the January 2025 tournament despite his retirement, the top rank in sumo did not remain vacant for long, as Hōshōryū won the January 2025 championship and was promoted to yokozuna in time for the March 2025 tournament.

At his retirement press conference, Terunofuji told reporters that based on his recent poor performances he felt like he should not "stand on the raised ring with a half-hearted mindset or body." He stated that he had told his stablemaster Isegahama after his Day 1 defeat to Wakatakakage that he wished to retire if he lost one more match. He also said that he felt like he had a vigorous sumo career. When asked about his most memorable sumo match, he recalled his first match in March 2019 after injury-related demotion from the second-highest rank of ōzeki to the second-lowest rank of jonidan. "I believe it turned out to be a good opportunity for me to enjoy a sumo career for the second time," he said. Terunofuji plans to remain with his stable (Isegahama) as a coach retaining the name Terunofuji, which he is permitted to do as a wrestler reaching yokozuna. Commenting on his new coaching role, Terunofuji said: "As the national sport, sumo exists to inspire the Japanese pride. That's why it has to be clean and beautiful. I want to raise wrestlers who do not lie or lose to themselves. Such wrestlers will definitely get strong."

Fellow Mongolian Miyagino (the 69th yokozuna Hakuhō), commenting on Terunofuji's retirement, noted that Terunofuji "recovered from rock bottom, both physically and mentally," and achieved the remarkable feat of reaching sumo's highest rank. He said that Terunofuji had done well, and could not imagine everything he had been going through.

In June 2025, the Sumo Association announced that Terunofuji would take over the Isegahama elder stock and Isegahama stable on 9 June, due to the former Asahifuji reaching sumo's mandatory retirement age of 65 the following month. Terunofuji will also oversee wrestlers that moved to Isegahama stable from Miyagino stable in 2024 following the latter's temporary closure by the association.

Terunofuji's retirement ceremony was held at the Ryōgoku Kokugikan on 31 January 2026. During the ceremony, he entered the ring for his last dohyō-iri while carrying his son. The two active yokozuna, Ōnosato and Hōshōryū, served as his dew sweeper and sword bearer, respectively. Around 330 people, including many celebrities, took part in the cutting of the topknot.

=== Assault allegations ===
On 27 February 2026, it was reported by multiple Japanese news outlets that the Japan Sumo Association's compliance committee was investigating Terunofuji for allegedly assaulting Isegahama stable wrestler and former Miyagino stable wrestler Hakunofuji. According to the reports, Terunofuji had self-reported the incident to the Sumo Association, with sources saying that he expressed remorse for his actions. On 24 February, the same day as the release of the rankings for the March 2026 tournament, Terunofuji was summoned to the Ryōgoku Kokugikan along with Hakunofuji and Nishikifuji for questioning. This meant that Terunofuji did not appear at the press conference for his wrestler Atamifuji upon the latter's first-time promotion to the san'yaku ranks. On the morning that the news broke about the investigation, Terunofuji admitted the act of violence to the press at Isegahama's training base in Osaka. He said that he committed an irresponsible act, informed the Sumo Association, and was awaiting punishment.

Prior to the start of the March 2026 tournament, the Sumo Association announced that Terunofuji would not be participating in the tournament as a provisional measure, although he reportedly could continue to train his wrestlers on stable grounds. After the tournament concluded, it was announced that the Sumo Association would convene an extraordinary board meeting on 9 April to discuss the allegations. In early April, the JSA investigation concluded that Hakunofuji had been struck twice in the face by Terunofuji during an evening event with patrons between February 20 and 21. The blows, delivered with a clenched fist and an open hand, were intended to discipline Hakunofuji, who was drunk and had inappropriately touched a female patron's thigh during a supporters' club appreciation party. The investigation also ruled out the use of a bottle in the violence incident, contrary to what had initially been reported in the press. According to the investigation, the violence reportedly occurred when Terunofuji asked Hakunofuji to stay in the building so he wouldn't have to go home alone while intoxicated. While reprimanding him, he struck his disciple to set an example for his patrons. Because the association's offices were closed on Sunday the 22nd and Monday the 23rd (a holiday in Japan), Terunofuji contacted Director Katsunorua (the former Kirinishiki) directly to report his actions. On the 24th, Hakunofuji and his master were heard by the association, where Terunofuji expressed deep remorse. As a result, Terunofuji was demoted two ranks in the toshiyori hierarchy and received a 10% pay cut for three months. Although criticized for being lenient compared to the case involving the closure of the Miyagino stable two years earlier, the penalty was defended by the JSA board of directors, which took into account Hakunofuji's behavior—which called for a reprimand—and Terunofuji's self-reporting, as he had come forward on his own initiative and at the earliest opportunity.

== Fighting style ==
Terunofuji was a yotsu-sumo wrestler who favoured grappling techniques as opposed to pushing and thrusting (oshi-sumo). His preferred grip on his opponent's mawashi or belt was migi-yotsu, a left hand outside, right hand inside position. His favourite winning kimarite or technique was a straightforward yori-kiri, or force out, which accounted for nearly two-thirds of his career victories. Prior to his demotion from the top division, he often relied on his physical strength to lift opponents with both arms and carry them out of the dohyō, a style of wrestling which was known for increasing the burden on his knees.

== Personal life ==
Terunofuji was married in February 2018 to a Mongolian exchange student, although he did not announce it until January 2021. They have known each other since before his first ōzeki promotion. Although their wedding ceremony took place on 11 February 2021 at the Tomioka Hachiman Shrine in Tokyo's Kōtō ward, their wedding reception took place on 11 June 2023 at a hotel in Tokyo, after having been postponed due to the COVID crisis. Around 800 people took part in the ceremony, including many athletes and Isegahama ichimon members. Terunofuji's wife is credited with being an unfailing supporter during his long injury layoff, as during this period he gave up drinking and she followed nutritional advice from his doctor in preparing his meals. During the post-tournament interviews in May 2023, Terunofuji announced to the press that he is the father of a son born in November 2022. The son's name, Temujin, is a reference to the original name of Genghis Khan.

In March 2021 Terunofuji revealed that he was in the process of acquiring Japanese citizenship, which would enable him to stay in sumo after retirement as an elder of the Japan Sumo Association. In August 2021, the Sumo Association announced that Terunofuji was officially a Japanese citizen. Terunofuji explained that he had made the decision to seek Japanese citizenship in 2019 following his fall to the second-lowest jonidan division, after consultation with his family, stablemaster and colleagues. His legal name is Seizan Suginomori, created by taking the surname and "sei" part of the forename from his stablemaster's real name of Seiya Suginomori.

== Career record ==
Terunofuji Haruo
Year	January Hatsu basho, Tokyo	March Haru basho, Osaka	May Natsu basho, Tokyo	July Nagoya basho, Nagoya	September Aki basho, Tokyo	November Kyūshū basho, Fukuoka
2011	x	Tournament Cancelled; Match fixing investigation 0–0–0	(Maezumo)	East Jonokuchi #3; 5–2	West Jonidan #59; 6–1	East Sandanme #93; 7–0–P
2012	East Makushita #58; 5–2	West Makushita #39; 5–2	West Makushita #27; 5–2	East Makushita #15; 3–4	West Makushita #21; 2–5	West Makushita #37; 4–3
2013	West Makushita #31; 5–2	West Makushita #20; 5–2	West Makushita #10; 6–1	East Makushita #4; 6–1	West Jūryō #11; 12–3–P; Champion	East Jūryō #3; 8–7
2014	West Jūryō #1; 12–3	West Maegashira #10; 8–7	East Maegashira #9; 9–6	East Maegashira #6; 9–6	East Maegashira #1; 6–9	West Maegashira #3; 8–7
2015	East Maegashira #2; 8–7; F	East Sekiwake #1; 13–2; FO	East Sekiwake #1; 12–3; F	West Ōzeki #2; 11–4	East Ōzeki #1; 12–3–P	East Ōzeki #1; 9–6
2016	West Ōzeki #1; 3–3–9	West Ōzeki #2; 8–7	West Ōzeki #2; 2–13	West Ōzeki #2; 8–7	West Ōzeki #1; 4–11	West Ōzeki #2; 8–7
2017	East Ōzeki #2; 4–11	West Ōzeki #1; 13–2–P	East Ōzeki #1; 12–3	East Ōzeki #1; 1–5–9	East Ōzeki #2; 1–5–9	East Sekiwake #2; 0–5–10
2018	East Maegashira #10; 0–8–7	West Jūryō #5; 6–9	East Jūryō #8; 0–9–6	East Makushita #6; Sat out due to injury 0–0–7	East Makushita #47; Sat out due to injury 0–0–7	West Sandanme #27; Sat out due to injury 0–0–7
2019	West Sandanme #88; Sat out due to injury 0–0–7	West Jonidan #48; 7–0–P	East Sandanme #49; 6–1	East Makushita #59; 6–1	East Makushita #27; 6–1	West Makushita #10; 7–0; Champion
2020	West Jūryō #13; 13–2; Champion	East Jūryō #3; 10–5	East Maegashira #17; Tournament Cancelled; State of Emergency; 0–0–0	East Maegashira #17; 13–2; OT	East Maegashira #1; 8–5–2	East Komusubi #1; 13–2–P; T
2021	East Sekiwake #1; 11–4; T	East Sekiwake #1; 12–3; O	West Ōzeki #2; 12–3–P	East Ōzeki #1; 14–1	West Yokozuna #1; 13–2	East Yokozuna #1; 15–0
2022	East Yokozuna #1; 11–4	East Yokozuna #1; 3–3–9	East Yokozuna #1; 12–3	East Yokozuna #1; 11–4	East Yokozuna #1; 5–5–5	East Yokozuna #1; Sat out due to injury 0–0–15
2023	East Yokozuna-Ōzeki #1; Sat out due to injury 0–0–15	East Yokozuna-Ōzeki #1; Sat out due to injury 0–0–15	East Yokozuna-Ōzeki #1; 14–1	East Yokozuna #1; 1–3–11	East Yokozuna #1; Sat out due to injury 0–0–15	East Yokozuna #1; Sat out due to injury 0–0–15
2024	East Yokozuna #1; 13–2–P	East Yokozuna #1; 2–5–8	East Yokozuna #1; 0–2–13	East Yokozuna #1; 12–3–P	East Yokozuna #1; Sat out due to injury 0–0–15	East Yokozuna #1; Sat out due to injury 0–0–15
2025	East Yokozuna #1; Retired; 2–3	x	x	x	x	x
Record given as wins–losses–absences Top division champion Top division runner-up Retired Lower divisions Non-participation Sanshō key: F=Fighting spirit; O=Outstanding performance; T=Technique Also shown: ★=Kinboshi; P=Playoff(s); Divisions: Makuuchi — Jūryō — Makushita — Sandanme — Jonidan — Jonokuchi Makuuchi ranks: Yokozuna — Ōzeki — Sekiwake — Komusubi — Maegashira

== Media appearances ==
- Sumo: Spirit Weighs Nothing

== See also ==
- Glossary of sumo terms
- List of sumo elders
- List of past sumo wrestlers
- List of Mongolian sumo wrestlers
- List of non-Japanese sumo wrestlers
- List of sumo record holders
- List of sumo top division champions
- List of sumo top division runners-up
- List of sumo second division champions
- List of yokozuna

Preceded by Kisenosato Yutaka	73rd Yokozuna; 2021–2025	Succeeded by Hōshōryū Tomokatsu
Yokozuna is not a successive rank, and more than one wrestler can hold the title at once
