= Hōshōryū Tomokatsu =

Mongolian sumo wrestler (born 1999)

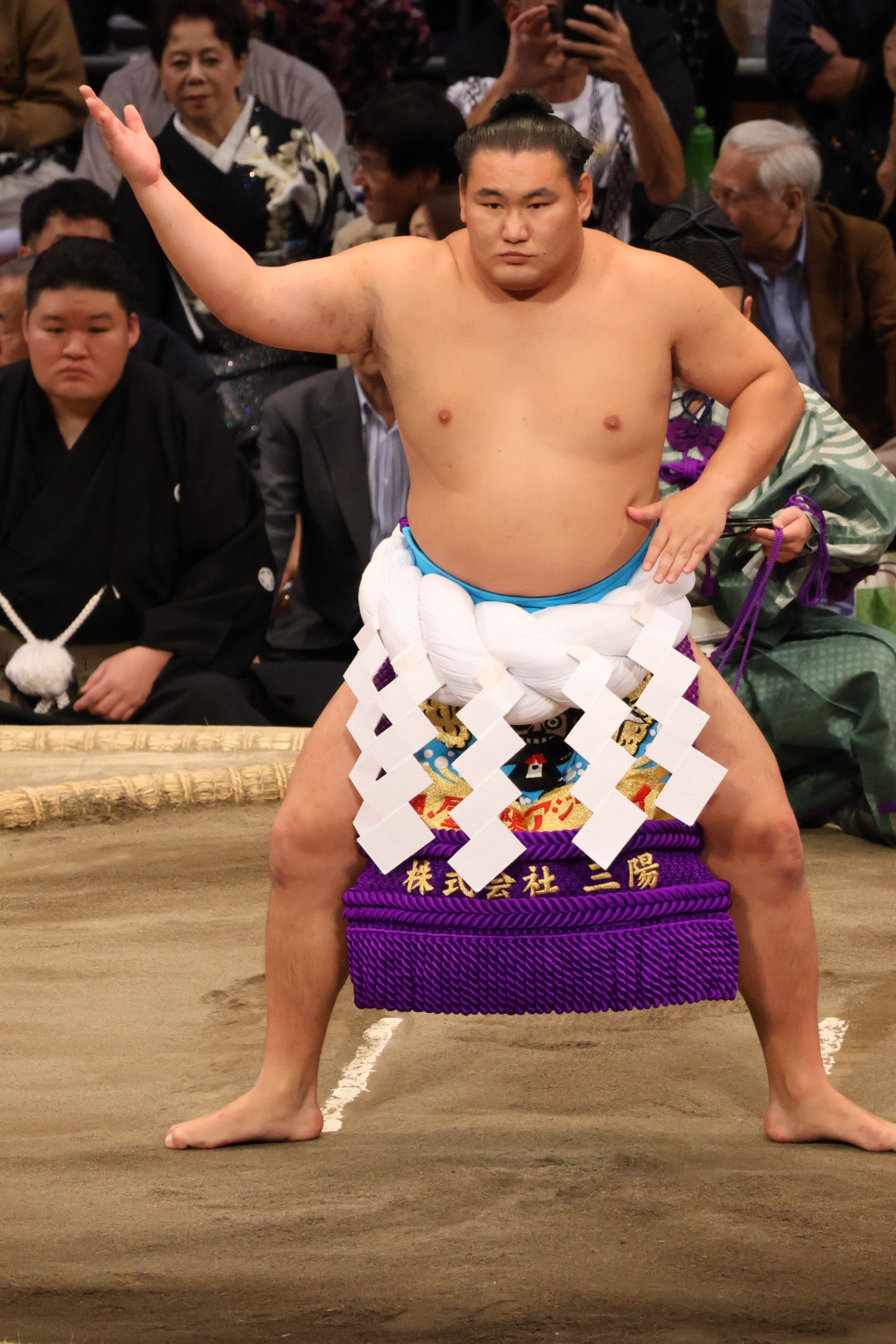
- Hōshōryū in November 2025

Personal information
- Native name: 豊昇龍 智勝
- Born: Sugarragchaagiin Byambasuren; May 22, 1999 (age 27) Ulaanbaatar, Mongolia
- Height: 188 cm (74 in)
- Weight: 150 kg (330 lb; 24 st)

Sport
- Sport: Sumo
- Rank: Yokozuna
- Heya: Tatsunami
- Debut: January 2018
- Highest rank: Yokozuna (March 2025)
- Championships: 2 (Makuuchi); 1 (Jonidan)
- Special Prizes: Technique (2); Fighting Spirit (1)
- Updated on May 1, 2025

Hōshōryū Tomokatsu (Japanese: 豊昇龍 智勝; born Sugarragchaagiin Byambasüren; (Note: Mongolian: Сугаррагчаагийн Бямбасүрэн) May 22, 1999) is a Mongolian professional sumo wrestler and the 74th yokozuna. Wrestling for Tatsunami stable, he made his professional debut in January 2018. He is especially known for his throws; Mongolian sumo wrestlers are often skilled throwers, reflecting the skills used in Mongolian wrestling.

Hōshōryū won his first top division title in July 2023, which subsequently promoted him to the rank of ōzeki. In the November 2024 tournament he finished runner-up with a strong 13–2 record, followed up by winning a second top-division title the next meet in January 2025. As a result he was promoted to sumo's highest rank of yokozuna. For the following four months Hōshōryū would serve as the sole yokozuna until soon being joined at the rank by rival Ōnosato. He is the nephew of the 68th yokozuna Asashōryū, who won an exceptional 25 championships and was the first Mongolian to reach the sport's highest rank.

== Early life and sumo background ==
Byambasüren was born in Ulaanbaatar, Mongolia, as the second son of former yokozuna Asashōryū's eldest brother (Sugarragchaa Dolgorsürengiin), who has a background as a bökh wrestler. Described as a "city kid", he spent all his summer vacations, particularly long in Mongolia (from June to September) camping in yurts. As a child, he was naturally athletic and learned to ride horses at the age of three. At the age of five, he began taking lessons in basketball and judo at the same club as fellow future-ōzeki Kirishima, saying that together they "were like friends". Born into a wrestling family, Byambasüren often socialized with other professional sumo wrestlers at dinner parties, notably with 73rd yokozuna Terunofuji, long before becoming a professional himself. He also watched his uncle's matches on television, and developed a great respect for him. Although he was not particularly fond of wrestling, he started taking bökh lessons at the age of 11 and achieved some local successes.

Upon graduation from middle school, he was scouted from Mongolia by Tomohiro Ōsawa, the coach of Japan's NSSU Kashiwa High School sumo club, who visited the country to scout for international sports students. There, he was recognized because his coach saw his look, similar to his famous uncle's "who always seemed to be fighting something". Although he did not feel like wrestling yet, he decided to give in to temptation and took a trip to Japan. He was finally recruited and attended Kashiwa High School in Chiba Prefecture, along future professional sumo wrestlers Ōshōma and Asahakuryū. There, he first joined the wrestling club, saying he was afraid of sumo, but in his first year he took part in a school trip and visited the Ryōgoku Kokugikan in Tokyo and became interested in the sport. After consulting with his uncle he committed to trying sumo at the high school level. Though he had no previous experience, he quickly started getting good results in amateur sumo tournaments and was seen as having great potential. In his third year, he was defeated by Tottori Jōhoku High School's wrestler Amartuvshin Amarsanaa at the Inter-High School Championships, allowing Amartuvshin to become the first foreign-born high school-level yokozuna in history.

== Early career and jūryō ==
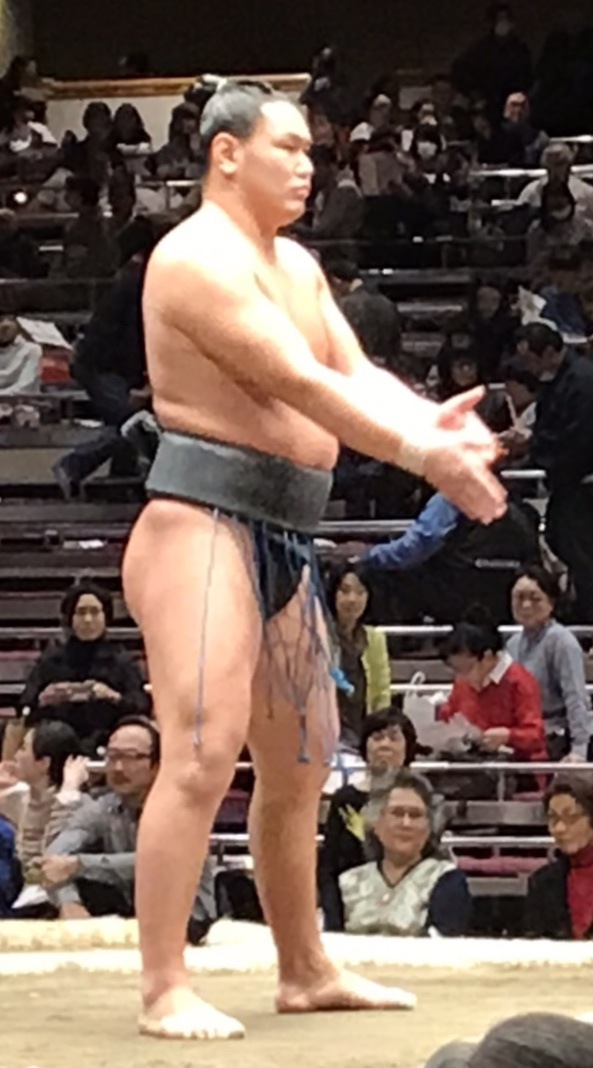
Hōshōryū in January 2019

Hōshōryū joined Tatsunami stable after high school. During this time, he was in regular contact with his uncle who gave him such advice as "build on your own strengths" and "don't put on weight quickly or you'll risk injury." Hōshōryū first stepped into the ring professionally in January 2018. In his maezumō debut, he was defeated by fellow debutant Naya, who was also garnering attention as the grandson of the greatly respected yokozuna Taihō. Because of their strong family ties to sumo, he commented that he and Naya (who later changed his shikona to Ōhō) felt close to each other. In his first official tournament on the banzuke in March 2018, Hōshōryū was close to winning the jonokuchi division championship after scoring six consecutive victories, but was defeated again by Naya, who went on to win the championship. Since then, the two wrestlers have maintained a certain rivalry.

In Hōshōryū's second tournament, he took the jonidan championship with a perfect record. On his debut in the sandanme division, he went 6–1 when scoring a win in his final match against Hiradoumi, securing promotion to the makushita division. During the summer tours in June, Hōshōryū was unusually chosen by yokozuna Hakuhō to participate in a training session, showing that he took him under his wing after helping to train him when he was still in high school. In his first tournament in the makushita division, he recorded 3 consecutive victories before recording 3 defeats. In his 7th bout, he was paired against Naya, who also had a score of 3–3, putting both wrestlers in a position of potential demotion to the sandanme division. Hōshōryū defeated Naya by kubinage, the latter suffering the first make-koshi record of his career and being logically relegated to the lower division for the November tournament of the same year.

In January 2019, Hōshōryū faced former makuuchi wrestler Ura, who was rising through the ranks after being absent from the ring since the September 2017 tournament. Although Hōshōryū defeated him by kakenage, Ura injured his knee again during the match and had to withdraw from the tournament before missing another four consecutive tournaments due to injury. Hōshōryū later said he was nervous about facing a former maegashira but felt responsible for the injury, going to the arena infirmary after the match to ask Ura for forgiveness. In May, Hōshōryū also recorded an eighth positive record and had a remarkable match against Kotonowaka, where observers noticed the similarities between Hōshōryū's technique and that of his uncle. In July 2019, Hōshōryū, then ranked as makushita 2, faced competition against opponents who had mostly already been ranked in the jūryō division. During this tournament he was called upon to wrestle in this upper-division with a match against jūryō Kizakiumi, where he suffered a defeat. That month, he suffered his only losing tournament in his rise through the lower divisions.

Hōshōryū quickly bounced back the following tournament in September 2019 and, with a winning record of 4–3 (kachi-koshi), he earned jūryō promotion for the November tournament in Fukuoka along with Kotoshōhō. At a press conference, Hōshōryū vowed to surpass his uncle's 25 championships. He also received a kimono from his uncle at the time of his promotion. In his jūryō debut, Hōshōryū began the tournament with a victory over Akiseyama, but suffered a make-koshi record on Day 14, with a loss to Sōkokurai. Despite this setback he logged two 8–7 records in the next two consecutive tournaments. In the July 2020 tournament (held in Tokyo instead of the usual Nagoya due to COVID concerns) he took part in a rare situation, where six wrestlers were lined up for the championship with ten wins each. In the preliminary stages of the playoff, he defeated Kyokutaisei. The race for the title culminated in a three-man playoff (tomoesen) between three members of Tatsunami stable. This playoff comprised himself, Akua, and Meisei. Bouts between stablemates are only allowed in the case of playoffs, where two or more wrestlers end up with the same record, and is a rare occurrence. Hōshōryū was defeated by former makuuchi wrestler Meisei, who went on to defeat Akua to take the championship.

== Makuuchi ==
=== Promotion and san'yaku career ===
Hōshōryū's performance in July 2020 was enough to propel him into the top-tier makuuchi division for the September 2020 tournament. He is the 50th foreigner to reach the top division, and the 27th Mongolian. In his first match in the division, he won his first victory in the opening match, beating Ichinojō with the surprising kimarite (winning technique) of yorikiri, the two wrestlers having a 70 kg (150 lb) difference at the time.

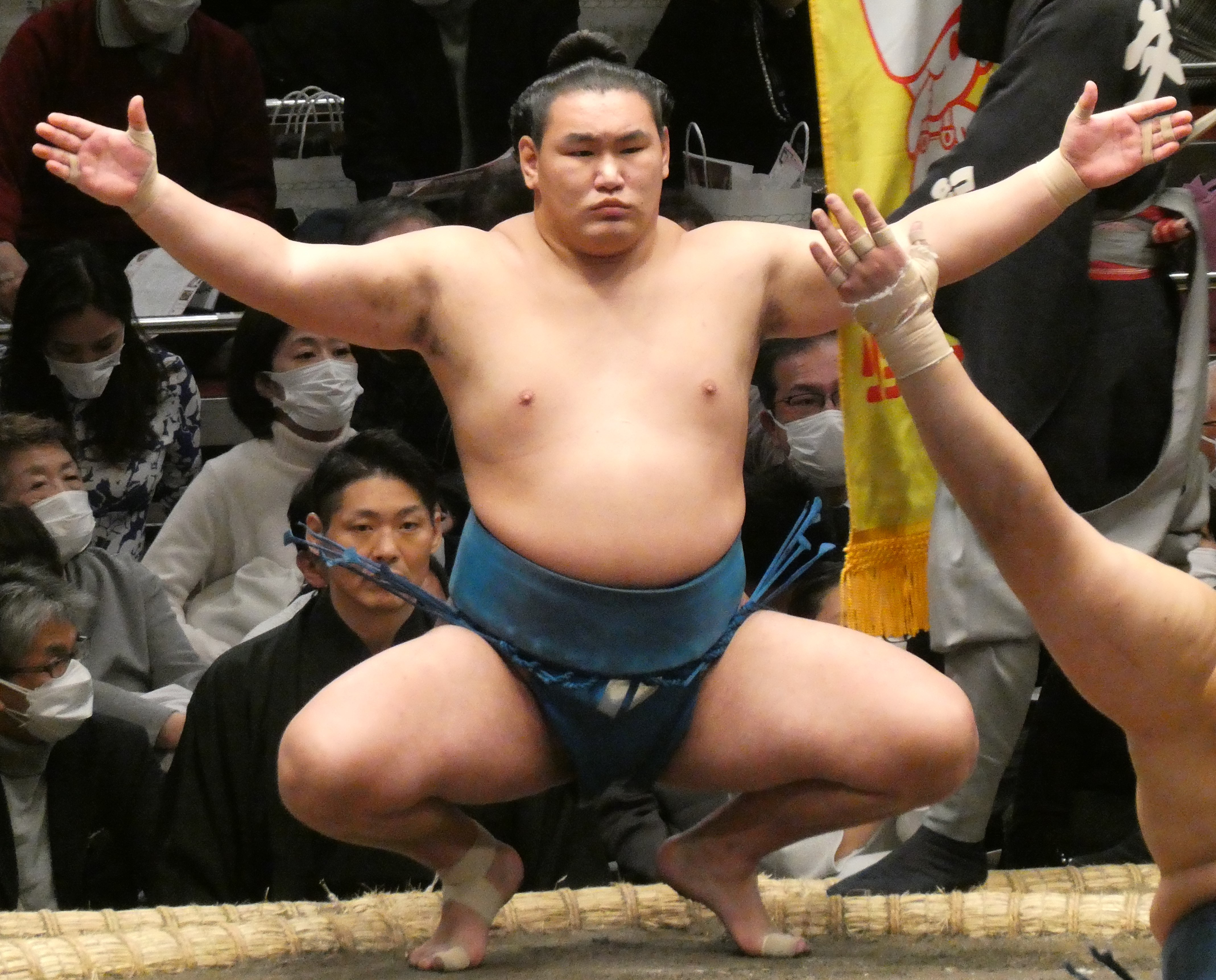
Hōshōryū in january 2022

In the July 2021 tournament Hōshōryū had his best result in the top division up to that point. On Day 11, he notably defeated ōzeki Shōdai by yoritaoshi, his fastest win to date. In total, he won ten bouts during the tournament, and was awarded his first special prize, the ginō-shō (Technique prize). After the tournament, he also received public congratulations from the executives of the Japan Sumo Association, including Chairman Hakkuku and Nishikido. In October of the same year, Sports Hōchi reported that after the July 2021 tournament he received a comment from the winner of the championship (yokozuna Hakuhō) who passed the baton to him in the hope that he would occupy the top of the sumo world. His performance saw him promoted to a new highest rank of Maegashira 1 for September, but in that tournament he had to withdraw on Day 5 with only one win because of tonsillitis. He returned on Day 8 and won four of his remaining eight matches. In the January 2022 tournament he produced a strong 11–4 record, and was then promoted to san'yaku for the first time, ranked at komusubi for the March 2022 tournament. He achieved winning records in three consecutive tournaments at komusubi, and earned a promotion to sekiwake for the September 2022 tournament. In the November tournament, Hōshōryū stood out by winning his fifth bout against Midorifuji with a rare kawazugake winning-move, a technique not seen in 10 years. He was the leader of the tournament after Day 11 with just one loss, but ultimately finished at 11–4. Still, it was his best performance to date in the san'yaku ranks. He received his second Technique Prize of his career by recording his eleventh victory over Kiribayama.

Hōshōryū had hopes of promotion to ōzeki if he produced double-digit wins in the January 2023 tournament, but he withdrew on Day 10 with a sprained left ankle. He returned to the tournament on Day 12 having missed just one day, and preserved his sekiwake rank on the final day, winning his eighth match after his opponent Ōnoshō was disqualified for a hair pull. In the March 2023 rankings, Hōshōryū retained his position as sekiwake. In that tournament he finished with a 10–5 record. Between March and May 2023, Hōshōryū won enough victories to reach double-digit records. After the May tournament, Judging Department chairman Sadagotake commented on the sekiwake results and announced that the July tournament would be one where promotion to ōzeki would be considered if Hōshōryū's results were good enough. Hōshōryū would need 12 wins at the July basho to reach the normal ōzeki promotion requirement of 33 wins at san'yaku in three tournaments.

=== Ōzeki race and promotion ===
In early June, Hōshōryū returned to Mongolia for the first time in four years, to recover physically and mentally in preparation for his run (ōzeki-tori) to the rank of ōzeki. There, he benefited in particular from advice from his uncle Asashōryū and declared that he intended to approach the tournament like his previous ones, "as usual" and without worrying too much about promotion. Prior to the July tournament, Hōshōryū also received a keshō-mawashi designed by manga artist Rieko Saibara, depicting one of the patrons of his stable (Katsuya Takasu) as Genghis Khan and the "blue wolf", a Mongolian legend. Originally, the keshō-mawashi was to be offered after a possible promotion to the rank of ōzeki, but Hōshōryū insisted on having it ready at the July tournament.

Hōshōryū began the July 2023 tournament by facing maegashira 1 Tobizaru. Despite designated the winner of the match, many spectators and journalists mentioned that Hōshōryū's hand had touched the ring floor before Tobizaru had fallen. In response to the growing criticism, the Nikkan Sports newspaper commented in an editorial that the judges had probably awarded the victory to Hōshōryū because he had shown himself to be dominant in the match and Tobizaru was not in a position to continue fighting. Nevertheless, Hōshōryū performed well in the following days, winning his second match against former ōzeki Shōdai, but lost to Maegashira Nishikigi, one of the tournament's surprise leaders, on Day 3. Hōshōryū bounced back, however, to win six consecutive victories to put him in the title race, including a notable one against Komusubi Abi by okurihikiotoshi, an unusual winning move. Between Days 10 and 12, however, he suffered two defeats to Komusubi Kotonowaka and title contender Hokutofuji. After defeating back-to-back Ōzeki Kirishima and ōzeki promotion-seeker Wakamotoharu, he entered the final day of the tournament in a three-way tie for the lead with eight-year sumo veteran Hokutofuji and 19-year-old makuuchi-newcomer Hakuōhō. Hōshōryū took on Hakuōhō in their scheduled Day 15 contest with the winner then needing to face Hokutofuji, who by winning that day against Nishikigi had triggered the necessity of a playoff. Hōshōryū brought down Hakuōhō, thus winning his 12th match of the tournament and his 33rd in three tournaments at a san'yaku rank, the threshold typically needed for ōzeki promotion. Hōshōryū then went on to defeat Hokutofuji in the playoff to secure his first top-division championship and second overall title in professional sumo. Upon winning the playoff and leaving the dohyō, Hōshōryū could not contain his emotions. "I was just so overwhelmed with joy, I was trying to hold it back but the tears just came," he said. He added that he did everything he could and did not think about a possible promotion, and that he wanted to share his joy with his stablemaster Tatsunami and with his uncle.

Since he had reached the quota of victories required for promotion, the board of directors of the Japan Sumo Association approved Hōshōryū's appointment to the rank of ōzeki, after JSA Chairman Hakkaku accepted the request of Judging Department head Sadogatake to hold an extraordinary board meeting to discuss the promotion. On July 26, Hōshōryū made his formal acceptance speech at his stable's lodging house in Nagoya, with his parents who had flown in from Mongolia for the ceremony. In his speech, Hōshōryū said that he would work hard with a spirit of kihaku issen (気魄一閃, the mental strength to fight powerfully) so as to not tarnish the rank of ōzeki. This promotion makes Hōshōryū the first wrestler promoted to the rank of ōzeki from Tatsunami stable in 37 years, since Futahaguro Kōji in 1986. He is also the seventh Mongolian ōzeki to date, after Kirishima was elevated to the rank in May 2023. After the September banzuke was released, Hōshōryū noted that he had to work even harder than before because many people were offering congratulations to him during the summer regional tours and he became accustomed to people referring to him as an ōzeki. He said that he had to win the September tournament by wrestling well.

=== Ōzeki career and yokozuna bid ===
Hōshōryū began his ōzeki career in September 2023 by narrowly escaping a kadoban situation with an eighth victory on the final day of the tournament against Hokuseihō.

During the November 2023 tournament, Hōshōryū stood out on the fifth day of the tournament in his match against Gōnoyama, a match during which the two wrestlers waited at the moment of the tachi-ai for a minute and a half, leading to three unsuccessful attempts to launch the initial charge. Although he won the match, Hōshōryū, due to his rank and three unsuccessful attempts was summoned by head judge Kumegawa to receive a verbal warning.

Hōshōryū was in contention of the top division championship during much of the January 2024 tournament. He aggravated his knee injury during his match with ozeki Kirishima, another championship contestant. He withdrew from the tournament the following day. Nevertheless, he had already achieved kachi-koshi. During the March tournament of the same year, Hōshōryū remained in the group of wrestlers still able to compete for the championship, notably standing out on Day 12 by beating Takerufuji, the newly promoted makuuchi who had been unbeaten until then. Hōshōryū's chances of staying in contention for the title came to an end on Day 14, however, after he was defeated by fellow ōzeki Kotonowaka. Hōshōryū withdrew on the thirteenth day of the July tournament with a thigh injury, having however confirmed a ninth victory the previous day against fellow ōzeki Kotozakura (the former Kotonowaka). During the August collective training sessions, however, the press reported his intention to take part in the September tournament, with Hōshōryū adding that he had put on 10 kg (22 lb; 1.6 st) to support his form.

Hōshōryū entered the 15th and final day of the November 2024 tournament facing Kotozakura once again, who was tied with him at the top of the leaderboard with 13 wins and 1 loss. In the final and deciding match, Hōshōryū's attempt at an overarm throw was unsuccessful, and Kotozakura slapped down on Hōshōryū's neck to push him down to the dohyō, giving Kotozakura the victory and the championship. Despite missing out on the championship, Hōshōryū's strong performance (13 wins and 2 losses as the runner up) was enough for the Sumo Association to announce that he would be a candidate for yokozuna promotion at the next tournament in January 2025. With Hōshōryū being designated by the Yokozuna Deliberation Council as an official candidate for the sport's supreme rank in the event of a championship victory, Kotozakura and Hōshōryū became the first two wrestlers in 55 years to be considered for promotion at the same time, since Kitanofuji and Tamanoumi in 1970 (Kitanofuji and Tamanoumi would both subsequently be promoted to yokozuna at the same time, following the January 1970 tournament).

At the January 2025 tournament, Hōshōryū began with a solid four-win streak. He then fell behind in the title race, after suffering a Day 5 defeat to Atamifuji. Hōshōryū stayed one win behind the leaders after seven days but then suffered consecutive defeats to rank-and-file opponents Shōdai and Hiradoumi, which had been seen as potentially thwarting his bid for promotion to yokozuna. On Day 12, Hōshōryū defeated then-tournament leader Kinbōzan to bring himself back into the race for the championship, tied for second with three other wrestlers (Ōhō, Kirishima and Takerufuji). On days thirteen and fifteen, Hōshōryū faced and defeated the other two active ōzeki, Ōnosato and fellow yokozuna promotion-seeker Kotozakura, to keep himself in the title race. With this latest victory, Hōshōryū secured his place in the first three-way playoff situation for a championship since the 2022 Kyūshū tournament. This situation had been decided at the time of the match between Ōhō and Kinbōzan, the latter having lost, and which was to set in motion at the very least a playoff between these two wrestlers. Hōshōryū won the draw to compete in the first bout, and he won the title after defeating Kinbōzan and Ōhō one after the other. Unusually, Hōshōryū received the Prime Minister's Cup from Japanese Prime Minister Shigeru Ishiba in person, a first since 2019.

Hōshōryū dedicated his championship to his old high school coach, Tomohiro Ōsawa, who had recruited him and brought him to Japan and who died in September 2024. During his championship interview, he mentioned that he would have liked to face Terunofuji one last time, as the latter had beaten him in the nine matches in which they had met.

Once Hōshōryū's victory was assured, the Judging Department of the Japan Sumo Association customarily sent up a request for an extraordinary meeting of the board of directors on January 29 to discuss Hōshōryū's promotion to the supreme rank of yokozuna. Although the sport's only active yokozuna, Terunofuji, retired during the tournament, it was brought up that the department of the shimpan was not unanimous regarding the promotion, some supporting Hōshōryū and others criticizing him for his defeats at the hands of rank-and-file wrestlers. Although the judges were divided, Judging Department chairman Takadagawa (the former Akinoshima) was confident in the formalization of the promotion.

=== Promotion to yokozuna ===
Meeting on January 27, 2025, the Yokozuna Deliberation Council received the formal request from the Sumo Association regarding Hōshōryū's promotion to the highest rank in professional sumo as the 74th yokozuna in the sport's history. After debate, the nine-member council unanimously recommended Hōshōryū's promotion.

On the day before his expected promotion it was reported that Hōshōryū would be adopting the Unryū ring-entering ceremony style, widely used by the Dewanoumi ichimon (or clan), to which Tatsunami stable belongs, and which was used not only by his uncle Asashōryū but also by Futabayama, another yokozuna raised in his stable. Commenting on his choice, Hōshōryū explained that he had decided on the Unryū style because it had made a particular impression on him as he watched his uncle perform this ceremony, feeling a strong sense of fighting spirit emanating from it. A member of the Dewanoumi ichimon, Hōshōryū was taught the style by Musashigawa (former yokozuna Musashimaru), who also used this style during his active career. Plans were also made for Hōshōryū to use a tachi and a set of keshō-mawashi that had belonged to Musashimaru for his first yokozuna ring-entering ceremony.

On the morning of January 29, 2025, the full board of the Sumo Association accepted the council's recommendation and unanimously promoted Hōshōryū to yokozuna. Hōshōryū is the sixth Mongolian to be promoted to sumo's highest rank, and the first wrestler to be promoted to yokozuna since Terunofuji in July 2021. He is the sixth-fastest wrestler to reach the top rank since the six-tournament system was introduced in 1958, doing so in 42 tournaments. The promotion also occurred on the same date in 2003 that his uncle Asashōryū became the first Mongolian-born yokozuna.

Soon after the promotion was finalized Hōshōryū and his stablemaster were visited at Tatsunami stable by Sumo Association representatives Sakaigawa (former komusubi Ryōgoku) and Ōnaruto (former ōzeki Dejima), who gave the in-person notification of the promotion. In his customary acceptance speech, Hōshōryū said: "I will continue to work hard with a strong determination in order not to tarnish the title of yokozuna." He once again used the Japanese words kihaku issen (気魄一閃, the mental strength to fight powerfully), the same words he used for his promotion to ōzeki, reproducing the choice his uncle Asashōryū had also made to use his same idiom twice for his two promotion ceremonies. Later, Hōshōryū told reporters that reaching the top rank was his dream since entering the sumo world. "I will try to elevate myself higher and higher," he said. "No matter what happens, I will stand strong."

Hōshōryū's first ring-entering ceremony as a yokozuna was held on 31 January at Tokyo's Meiji Shrine in front of about 3,500 people. Stablemate Meisei served as the tsuyuharai (dew sweeper), and Hiradoumi was the tachimochi (sword bearer). Among the members of Hōshōryū's family in attendance was Asashōryū, who had arrived in Japan the previous day.

Following the release of the March 2025 rankings Hōshōryū said that seeing his name at the top of the list was "a little scary," but he was also happy and had "a grave sense of responsibility."

== Yokozuna ==
=== 2025 ===
In preparation for the 2025 March tournament, Hōshōryū affirmed his attention to participating in the tournament although he appeared the day before his consecration ceremony at the Sumiyoshi-taisha with a brace on his right elbow, mentioning that he had torn cartilage. His Yokozuna debut was rough; he lost in his first bout, gave out three kinboshi (the highest number for a modern Yokozuna debut), and withdrew from the tournament after day 9 due to his elbow injury. It was the first time a new yokozuna withdrew from their first tournament at sumo's highest rank since Futahaguro in September 1986.

Hōshōryū returned at the May 2025 tournament and, despite conceding two more kinboshi, finished runner up (jun-yusho) with his first double-digit win total as a yokozuna, claiming twelve wins including a defeat of ōzeki and yūshō winner Ōnosato on the 15th and final day, spoiling Ōnosato's perfect tournament record (zenshō-yusho) and staining his subsequent promotion as the 75th yokozuna.

Hōshōryū suffered another poor start in the July 2025 tournament, conceding three gold stars in a row to rank-and-filers Wakamotoharu, Aonishiki and Abi before pulling out on Day 5. In withdrawing from the July tournament, Hōshōryū became the third yokozuna in modern sumo history, after Asashio III and Kisenosato, to withdraw twice from their first three tournaments at sumo's highest rank. His stablemaster Tatsunami later said that Hōshōryū had a bone crack in his left big toe, and had to be persuaded to pull out of the tournament rather than continue on. The stablemaster added that he wanted his yokozuna to be in "perfect shape next time in order to compete for the title." He took off the first few days of the summer regional tours, and upon joining the tour was seen wearing a tabi on his left foot. He told reporters that he had been experiencing pain in his toe even before the start of the July tournament, not realizing that he had a bone crack. He got injured, he said, "because my desire to win the championship was too strong."

During the September tournament, Hōshōryū recorded a series of eleven consecutive victories, leading the tournament, before suffering two consecutive defeats at the hands of Aonishiki (day 12) and Kotozakura (day 13). Now surpassed in score by Ōnosato, the other yokozuna, Hōshōryū remained in a position to trigger a playoff on the final day, the match becoming the first time since the 2020 Osaka tournament where two yokozuna could enter a playoff situation. Hōshōryū defeated Ōnosato by oshidashi, triggering the playoff. The following match became the first playoff between two yokozuna since Asashōryū and Hakuhō in January 2009. Hōshōryū then lost the playoff, defeated by yoritaoshi, missing out on the championship.

On October 6, Hōshōryū won the All Japan Rikishi Championship, a charity tournament organized by Meiji Shrine, winning the tournament for the first time in three years by defeating Ōnosato. On 7 October, he also participated in ceremonies marking the 100th anniversary of the Japan Sumo Association. He took part in a special goningakari demonstration match, where he fought against five other lower-ranked wrestlers (Gōnoyama, Hiradoumi, Ura, Rōga, Meisei). He also participated in a sandangamae ceremony performed with the other yokozuna (Ōnosato), a first since 2017 where the ceremony was performed by Hakuhō and Kisenosato. Later in October Hōshōryū won a five-day tournament in London sanctioned by the Sumo Association, in what was professional sumo's first tour in London since 1991.

Despite starting the 2025 November tournament by conceding a gold star to Hakuōhō, Hōshōryū managed to stay in the group of wrestlers chasing the tournament leaders, joining them on the thirteenth day with a victory over Kotozakura. On the fourteenth day, however, he suffered a defeat against Aonishiki, redrawing the map in the title race and putting the two yokozuna Hōshōryū and Ōnosato and sekiwake Aonishiki on equal footing. On the final day, he was awarded a default win over Ōnosato, who pulled out of the tournament. Qualifying for the final playoff, Hōshōryū was defeated by Aonishiki, narrowly missing out for a second time on a championship.

=== 2026 ===
At the January 2026 tournament, there were several concerns regarding Hōshōryū's left knee. Medical reports indicated that he had injured his meniscus in practice and needed fluid drained from his knee daily. Despite this, Hōshōryū entered the tournament and competed on all 15 days, obtaining a 10th victory on Day 15 by defeating fellow yokozuna Ōnosato, who was also dealing with an injury.

At the March 2026, Hōshōryū started well, winning six of his first eight matches. He did, however, concede kinboshi to rising star Fujinokawa and former sekiwake Daieishō. This was the second consecutive tournament where Hōshōryū lost to Daieishō on Day 8. Hōshōryū remained in the championship alongside former ōzeki and longtime friend Kirishima. On Day 12, Hōshōryū was defeated by Kirishima, who would later go on to win the title and secure his repromotion to ōzeki. Hōshōryū lost to ōzeki Kotozakura on Day 14 to be eliminated from the title race and give the yūshō to Kirishima. On Day 15, Hōshoryū defeated injured ōzeki Aonishiki for the first time, giving the ōzeki his first losing record and ensuring Hōshōryū finished with a record of 11 wins and 4 losses. This was his 6th career jun-yūshō.

Prior to the May 2026 tournament, Ōnosato and Aonishiki both withdrew from the start due to injuries. With both of his closest rivals absent, the path for Hōshōryū to claim his long-awaited first title as a yokozuna seemed clear. However Hōshōryū appeared to injure his thigh in his opening day loss to komusubi Takayasu, limping out of the ring and being brought out of the arena in a wheelchair. He announced his withdrawal the following day, citing a right hamstring injury. This left both yokozuna and one of the three ōzeki absent from the tournament. This was the third time Hōshōryū had withdrawn as a yokozuna and the eighth time overall.

During the July tournament, Hōshōryū had a mixed record. After injuring his right knee on the sixth day, he suffered two consecutive losses on the ninth and tenth days of the tournament. On the fourteenth day, it was announced that he would withdraw from the tournament. His medical report cited an injury to his right medial collateral ligament and his right hamstrings, requiring approximately six weeks of recovery. This withdrawal also marked the fourth time in nine tournaments as a yokozuna that Hōshōryū had been forced to withdraw from competition. His withdrawal also meant that Kirishima, one of the tournament's frontrunners and a candidate for the yokozuna title, would be awarded a default victory. In August, it was announced that Hōshōryū had undergone surgery on his right knee and that his recovery period was not yet over, making his participation in the September tournament highly uncertain. He eventually pulled out of the tournament entirely.

Similarly, prior to the November tournament, there were questions about his ability to compete and the expectations should he do so. Strong performances in the autumn jungyō led to Hōshōryū chosing to compete. The first half of his tournament was far from ideal, as he conceded not less than four kinboshi—a first since the July 2025 tournament—and became the 20th yokozuna in the sport's history to concede that many. On the thirteenth day, he finally managed to secure his eighth victory over Aonishiki, saying—visibly moved—that he was happy to have been able to wrestle until the very end and come out with a winning record despite repeated injuries. Hōshōryū failed to win a title in his first eleven tournaments after being promoted to the highest rank. He thus became the fourth yokozuna—since the introduction of the six-tournament-a-year system in 1958—to suffer this failure, following Asashio III, Kashiwado, and Wakanohana III. Reflecting on his struggles, his mentor Tatsunami (the former Asahiyutaka) criticized him for a lack of consistent training and for refusing to visit certain heya to face strong wrestlers (such as Isegahama).

== Fighting style ==
Hōshōryū's Japan Sumo Association profile lists his preferred grip on his opponent's mawashi as migi-yotsu, a left hand outside, right hand inside position. He is fond of using shitatenage (underarm throw) and yorikiri (frontal force out). He also likes the outside leg trip, or sotogake, which is beginning to be seen as a trademark move of his. With his fierce fighting style, he makes full use of his speed and athleticism. Because of that, he has captured the attention of many fans early in his career.

== Personal life ==
Hōshōryū comes from a prestigious wrestling family, his father (the eldest brother) and uncles all having wrestling backgrounds. In addition to former yokozuna Asashōryū, he counts among his uncles Dolgorsürengiin Sumyaabazar, a Mongolian politician and former Olympic freestyle wrestling athlete, and Dolgorsürengiin Serjbüdee, who was a professional wrestler and mixed martial artist. His paternal grandfather, Donrovyn Dolgorsüren, is also a renowned bökh wrestler, having achieved the status of Ulsyn zaan (Mongolian: Улсын заан), meaning 'National Elephant', which means he reached a semi-final in a national Naadam wrestling festival. In October 2024, his cousin Serjbüdeegiin Luvsangombo, son of Dolgorsürengiin Serjbüdee (the former Blue Wolf) also became a professional sumo wrestler at Shikoroyama stable, under the ring name Tenrōsei.

Since Hōshōryū is the nephew of the 68th yokozuna Asashōryū, the latter regularly comments on his performances in the ring. Hōshōryū notably cited his uncle's anger when he suffered three consecutive defeats in March 2019, and his uncle's criticism on Twitter of his style at the September 2019 tournament. Asashōryū is also not shy on the subject of encouraging his nephew's direct opponents, as was the case at the January 2025 tournament, when he called stablemaster Kise (the former Higonoumi), the master of Kinbōzan (the wrestler then leading the championship), going so far as to say that Kinbōzan should not lose to "this jerk" (あのヤロウ, anoyarō), referring to Hōshōryū. Hōshōryū maintains a complicated relationship with the aura his uncle has over professional sumo, feeling that he is "perpetually chasing his shadow." Reportedly, the two even got into a bad argument after he and Asashōryū had several disagreements, the former yokozuna insisting beyond reason and provoking in Hōshōryū the feeling of being harassed by his uncle. Hōshōryū also commented on his annoyance at being regularly compared to his uncle.

During the May 2025 tournament it was reported that Hōshōryū was preparing to apply for Japanese citizenship, which is required to remain with the Sumo Association as an elder after retirement.

== Career record ==
Hōshōryū Tomokatsu
Year	January Hatsu basho, Tokyo	March Haru basho, Osaka	May Natsu basho, Tokyo	July Nagoya basho, Nagoya	September Aki basho, Tokyo	November Kyūshū basho, Fukuoka
2018	(Maezumō)	West Jonokuchi #19; 6–1	West Jonidan #42; 7–0; Champion	East Sandanme #42; 6–1	East Makushita #56; 4–3	East Makushita #49; 6–1
2019	West Makushita #21; 5–2	West Makushita #7; 4–3	West Makushita #4; 4–3	West Makushita #2; 3–4	East Makushita #5; 4–3	West Jūryō #13; 7–8
2020	East Jūryō #14; 8–7	West Jūryō #9; 8–7	East Jūryō #6; Tournament Cancelled; State of Emergency; 0–0–0	East Jūryō #6; 10–5–PP	West Maegashira #16; 8–7	East Maegashira #13; 7–8
2021	East Maegashira #14; 9–6	West Maegashira #9; 8–7	East Maegashira #5; 7–8	West Maegashira #5; 10–5; T	East Maegashira #1; 5–8–2	West Maegashira #5; 7–8
2022	East Maegashira #6; 11–4	West Komusubi #1; 8–7	East Komusubi #1; 8–7	East Komusubi #1; 9–6	West Sekiwake #1; 8–7	West Sekiwake #1; 11–4; T
2023	West Sekiwake #1; 8–7	West Sekiwake #1; 10–5	West Sekiwake #1; 11–4	East Sekiwake #1; 12–3–P; F	West Ōzeki #2; 8–7	West Ōzeki #2; 10–5
2024	West Ōzeki #1; 10–4–1	West Ōzeki #1; 11–4	East Ōzeki #1; 10–5	West Ōzeki #1; 9–4–2	West Ōzeki #1; 8–7	West Ōzeki #1; 13–2
2025	West Ōzeki #1; 12–3–PP	East Yokozuna #1; 5–5–5	East Yokozuna #1; 12–3	East Yokozuna #1; 1–4–10	West Yokozuna-Ōzeki #1; 13–2–P	West Yokozuna-Ōzeki #1; 12–3–P
2026	East Yokozuna #1; 10–5	East Yokozuna #1; 11–4	East Yokozuna #1; 0–2–13	East Yokozuna #1; 7–7–1	West Yokozuna #1; Sat out due to injury 0–0–15	West Yokozuna #1; 9–6
Record given as wins–losses–absences Top division champion Top division runner-up Retired Non-participation Jūryō Lower divisions Sanshō key: F=Fighting spirit; O=Outstanding performance; T=Technique Also shown: ★=Kinboshi; P=Playoff(s); Divisions: Makuuchi — Jūryō — Makushita — Sandanme — Jonidan — Jonokuchi Makuuchi ranks: Yokozuna — Ōzeki — Sekiwake — Komusubi — Maegashira

== See also ==
- Glossary of sumo terms
- List of active sumo wrestlers
- List of Mongolian sumo wrestlers
- List of non-Japanese sumo wrestlers
- List of active gold star earners
- List of active special prize winners
- List of sumo top division champions
- List of sumo top division runners-up
- List of yokozuna

== Notes ==
Preceded by Terunofuji Haruo	74th Yokozuna; 2025–present	Succeeded by Ōnosato Daiki
Yokozuna is not a successive rank, and more than one wrestler can hold the title at once
