= Itsutsushima Narao =

Japanese sumo wrestler

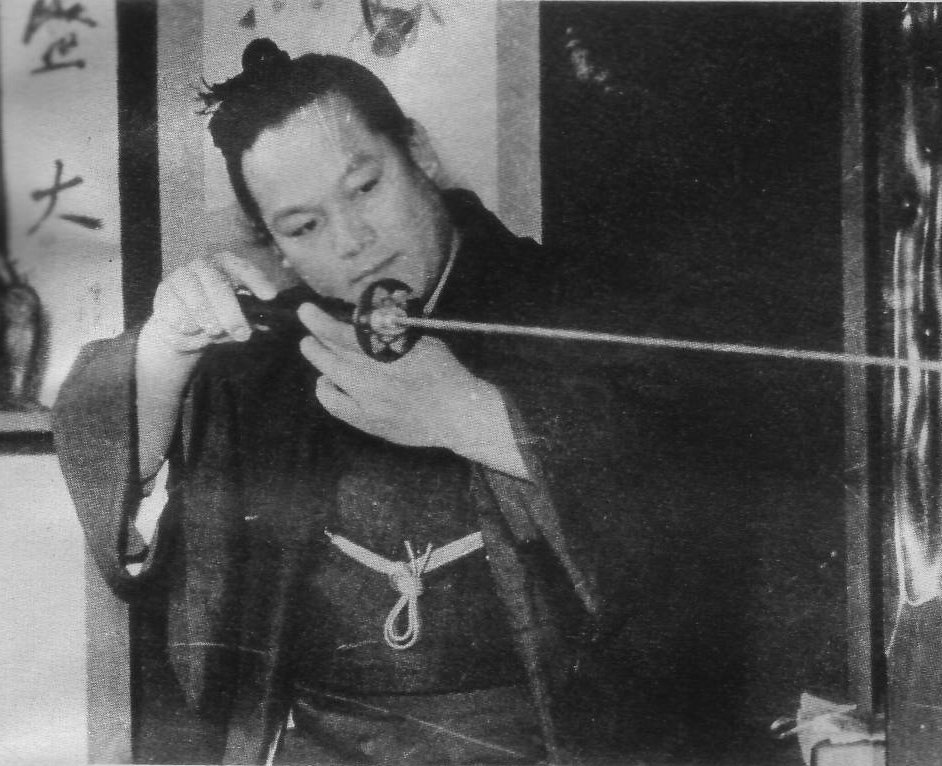
- Itsutsushima admiring a sword (c. 1939)

Personal information
- Native name: 五ツ嶋 奈良男
- Born: Isaichi Kanesaki; December 22, 1912 Minami-Matsuura, Nagasaki Prefecture, Japan
- Died: May 6, 1973 (aged 60)
- Height: 1.73 m (5 ft 8 in)
- Weight: 113 kg (249 lb; 17.8 st)

Sport
- Sport: Sumo
- Retired: January 1942
- Heya: Dewanoumi
- Record: 171-113-20
- Debut: January 1931
- Highest rank: Ōzeki (January 1941)
- Gold Stars: 1 (Futabayama)
- Updated on August 13, 2023

Itsutsushima Narao (五ツ嶋 奈良男), born as Isaichi Kanesaki (Kanesaki Isaichi (Japanese: 金崎伊佐一), December 22, 1912 – May 6, 1973 was a Japanese professional sumo wrestler from Minamimatsuura (now Shin-Kamigotō), Nagasaki Prefecture.

== History ==
Itsutsushima was born in Minamimatsuura district in 1912, a district located on the Gotō Islands. Because his hometown is located in an island, he became a fisherman, and wrestled as an amateur sumo wrestler, serving as a local ōzeki. His back and legs were well-trained because he was a fisherman, the roll of his boat naturally reinforcing his wrestling skills. One day, recently retired Yokozuna Tsunenohana came to his hometown. He was scouted and encouraged to join Tsunenohana’s Dewanoumi stable, and he stepped in the ring for the first time during the May 1930 tournament.

Itsutsushima did not rise by leaps and bounds, but steadily climbed the ranks thanks to his enthusiasm during training sessions. In this regard, he was nicknamed "keiko yokozuna" (けいこ横綱). Shortly after his promotion to the jūryō division, he received the shikona, or ring name, Itsutsushima with the character 五, meaning five, borrowed from his native islands' name (五島列島). One of the highlights of his career was the January 1940 tournament, during which he inflicted an upset victory on the then-dominant yokozuna Futubayama by hatakikomi. This victory promoted him directly to the rank of sekiwake for the 1940 summer tournament. During that tournament, he scored a seven matches winning streak for his san'yaku debut, a record that would only be equalled by Terunofuji at the March 2015 tournament, 75 years later. Itsutsushima won a second match in a row against Futabayama in on Day 11 (by tottari), the yokozuna deciding to withdraw from the tournament (kyūjō) the following day. Along with future-yokozuna Terukuni, Itsutsushima was the only wrestler to have won back-to-back matches against Futabayama since Futabayama's promotion to the rank of yokozuna in 1938. Itsutsushima also scored a notable victory over fellow-sekiwake and future-yokozuna Terukuni on Day 14. He came close to winning the championship but took second place just behind the tournament winner, stablemate Akinoumi. For their excellent performances during the tournament, he and Akinoumi were promoted to ōzeki at the same time for the January 1941 tournament. This promotion made Itsutsushima the fourth wrestler from Nagasaki Prefecture to be promoted to this rank and the first since Tsushimanada in 1919, 22 years earlier.

However, Itsutsushima had to withdraw from his first tournament as ōzeki due to a knee injury. In a kadoban demotion-threatening situation for the 1941 summer tournament, Itsutsushima came close to securing his position, but suffered six consecutive defeats and fell to eight defeats on the final day, making his demotion certain. With only two tournaments ranked as ōzeki, Itsutsushima is the wrestler who have spent the fewest tournaments at this rank since the Shōwa era. Since he was relegated back to the rank of sekiwake, he lost his motivation to continue fighting and left the Japan Sumo Association. At this time, the Pacific War was also raging, and the Sumo Association had to take out numerous loans to survive in a context where the war effort was reaching its peak, leaving few resources for its elders or wrestlers who wished to develop an activity of their own. With no opportunity to establish himself as a master, Itsutsushima returned to his island and invested in various fish industries. He later returned to Tokyo and opened several businesses in Shinagawa to sell local Gotō Islands products, and later opened a sumo restaurant and a hotel.

== Family and influence ==
Since Itsutsushima hails from the Gotō Islands, he became very popular in his native region. Future-yokozuna Sadanoyama said that he aspired to turn pro because of the success of Itsutsushima. In his autobiography, Ōzeki Masuiyama I mentions Itsutsushima as a caring mentor during the period when their respective careers overlapped.

Itsutsushima's name is engraved in the Chikara-zuka (力塚; 'power mound') monument, built in 1937 in the Ekō-in Temple's precincts by the Sumo Association as a memorial to past wrestlers. In 2016, the Sumo Museum acquired Itsutsushima's keshō-mawashi. The keshō-mawashi depicts Zhong Kui and had been presented to him on the occasion of his promotion to ōzeki by supporters of the village of Narao.

Komusubi Itsutsūmi, who comes from the same region, is a distant relative of Itsutsushima. He joined Dewanoumi stable in 1940 and received a shikona to evoke his parent who had just became an san'yaku.

== Top Division Record ==
Itsutsushima Narao
-	New Year Hatsu basho, Tokyo	Spring Haru basho, Osaka	Summer Natsu basho, Tokyo	Autumn Aki basho, Tokyo
1930	(Maezumo)	(Maezumo)	Unknown	Unknown
1931	East Jonokuchi #7; 5–1	East Jonokuchi #7; 4–2	West Jonidan #10; 3–3	West Jonidan #10; 5–1
1932	East Sandanme #15; 5–3	East Sandanme #15; 8–2	East Makushita #17; 7–4	East Makushita #17; 4–7
1933	East Makushita #11; 5–6	Not held	East Makushita #14; 7–4	Not held
1934	West Makushita #2; 6–4	Not held	East Jūryō #8; 6–5	Not held
1935	East Jūryō #5; 5–6	Not held	West Jūryō #8; 8–3	Not held
1936	West Jūryō #1; 7–4	Not held	East Maegashira #15; 7–4	Not held
1937	West Maegashira #5; 7–4	Not held	West Maegashira #1; 4–9	Not held
1938	West Maegashira #6; 10–3	Not held	East Maegashira #2; 5–8	Not held
1939	East Maegashira #6; 8–5	Not held	West Maegashira #2; 9–6	Not held
1940	West Maegashira #1; 11–4 ★	Not held	West Haridashi Sekiwake; 13–2	Not held
1941	East Haridashi Ōzeki; 5–5–5	Not held	East Haridashi Ōzeki; 7–8	Not held
1942	East Sekiwake #1; Retired; 0–0–15			
Record given as win-loss-absent Top Division Champion Top Division Runner-up Retired Lower Divisions Key: ★=Kinboshi(s); d=Draw(s) (引分); h=Hold(s) (預り); Divisions: Makuuchi — Jūryō — Makushita — Sandanme — Jonidan — Jonokuchi Makuuchi ranks: Yokozuna — Ōzeki — Sekiwake — Komusubi — Maegashira

== See also ==
- Glossary of sumo terms
- List of past sumo wrestlers
- List of ōzeki

== Sources ==
=== Further reading ===
- "大相撲名門列伝シリーズ(1) 出羽海部屋・春日野部屋" [Grand Sumo Tournament Series (1) Dewanoumi stable/Kasugano stable]. Sumo Magazine (July 2017). Baseball Magazine, Inc.: 23.
