= Sumo: Spirit Weighs Nothing =

2026 documentary film by Erik Shirai

- American teaser poster
- Directed by: Erik Shirai
- Produced by: Sigrid Dyekjær; Yusuke Kamata; Teddy Leifer; Erik Shirai; Sam Stanley; Carolyn Hepburn
- Starring: Terunofuji Haruo; Hiradoumi Yūki; Yonezawaryu Daiki; Kosei Motomura
- Cinematography: Hiroshi Hara; Erik Shirai
- Edited by: Frederick Shanahan
- Music by: Rutger Hoedemaekers
- Production companies: ESPN Films; Rise Films; Real Lava; Generation 11
- Distributed by: The Walt Disney Company (U.S.)
- Release date: 3 September 2026 (Venice)
- Running time: 99 minutes
- Countries: Japan; United States; United Kingdom; Denmark
- Language: Japanese

Sumo: Spirit Weighs Nothing is a 2026 sports documentary film written and directed by Erik Shirai. A co-production of Japan, United States, United Kingdom, and Denmark, it is rare inside access to Japan's private world of sumo.

The film had its world premiere in the Venice Spotlight section of the 83rd Venice International Film Festival on 3 September 2026. It will be released by ESPN in 2027.

== Contents ==
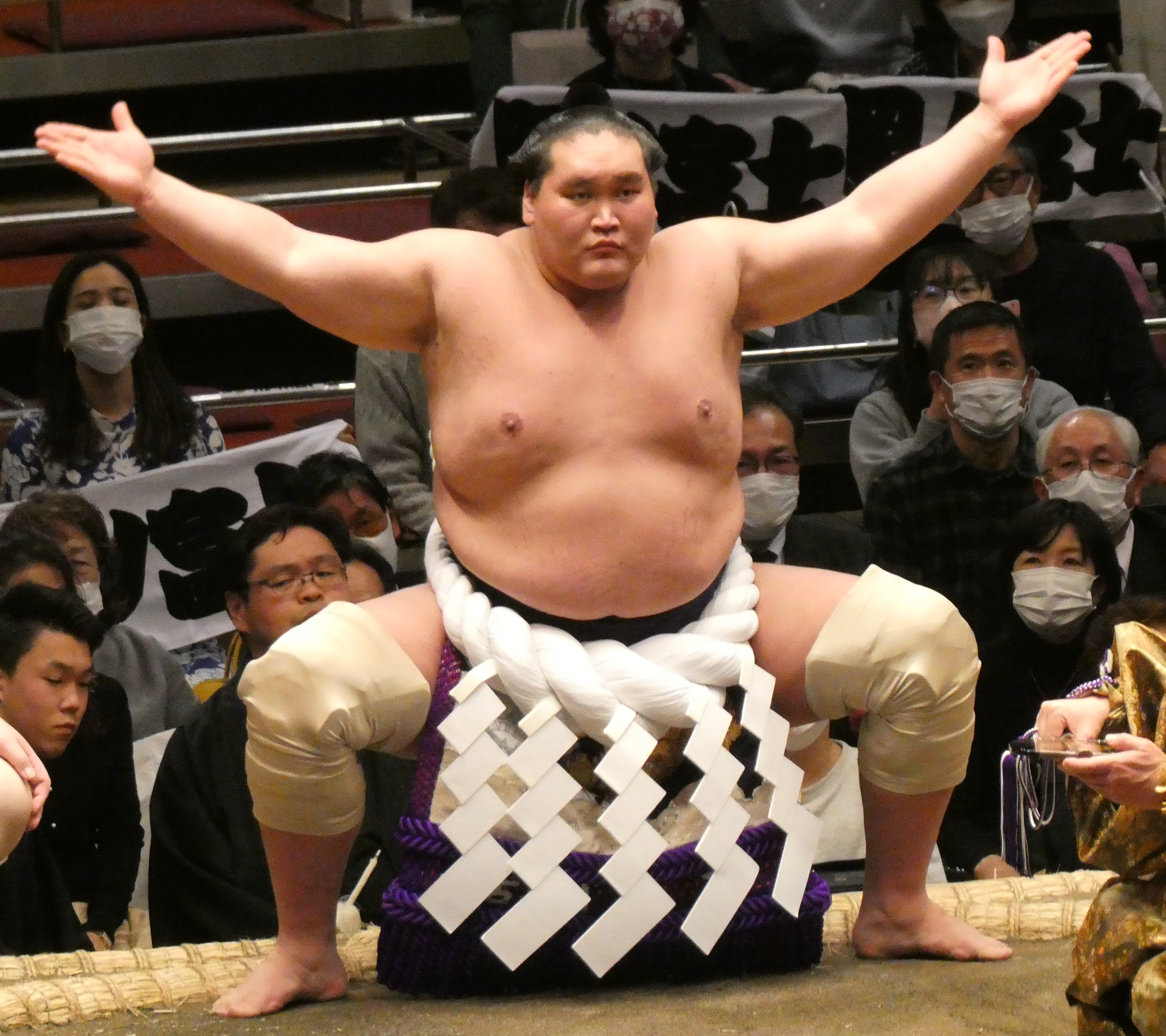
Terunofuji Haruo, sumo wrestler

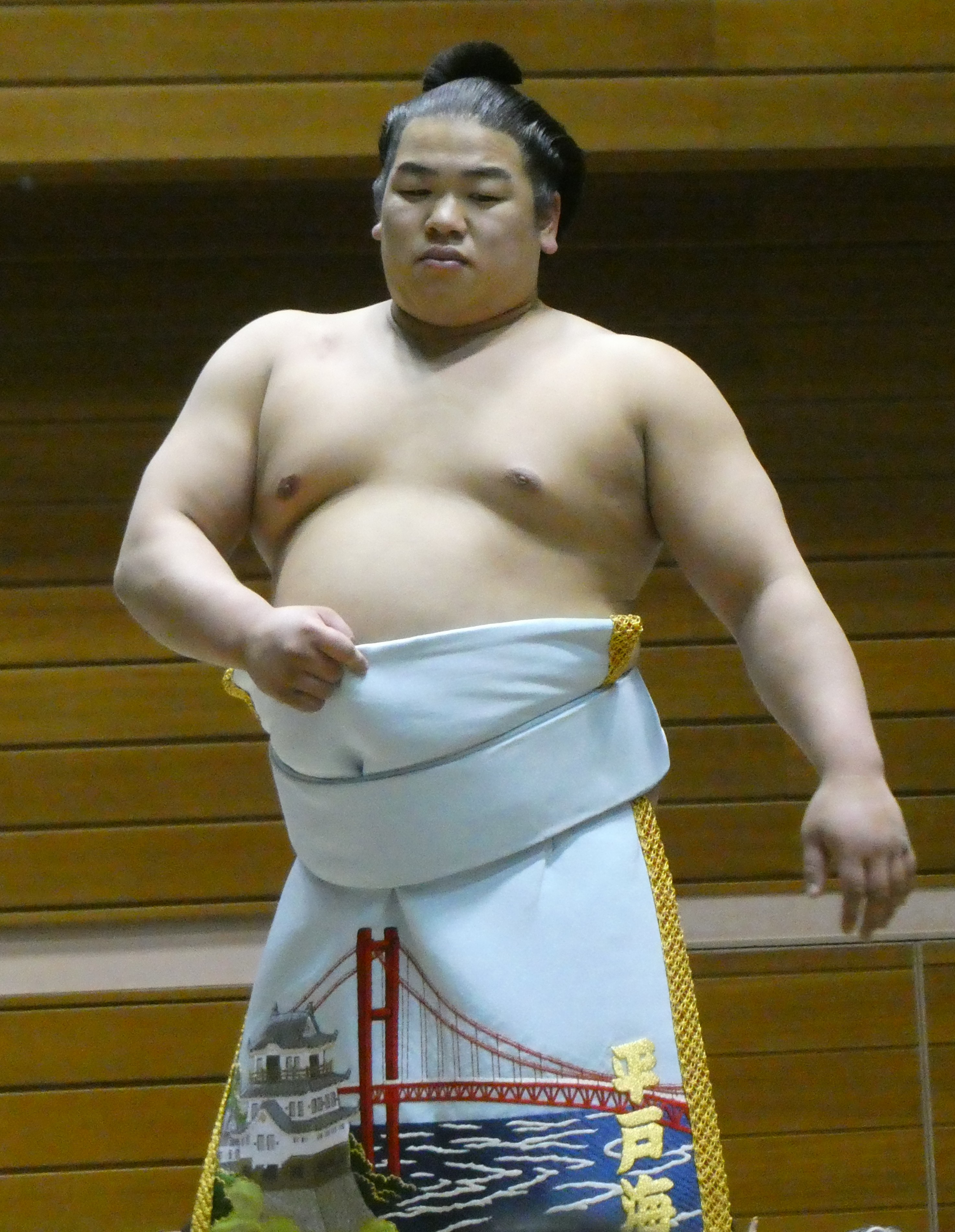
Hiradoumi Yūki, sumo wrestler

Sumo: Spirit Weighs Nothing is a documentary that follows Japanese sumo wrestlers over 12 months. It shows their training, daily lives, injuries and the physical and emotional demands of the sport. It also includes scenes of their movements and the sounds of the training halls, and presents "sumo as a tradition in which true strength is measured not only by physical power but also by mental and spiritual endurance."

The film features Terunofuji, a yokozuna, the highest rank in professional sumo. It follows his commitment to sumo and the demands of his position. The documentary focuses on the wrestlers' lives and training rather than their matches.

== Cast ==
- Terunofuji Haruo
- Hiradoumi Yūki
- Yonezawaryu Daiki
- Kosei Motomura

== Release ==
Sumo: Spirit Weighs Nothing had its world premiere in the Venice Spotlight section of the 83rd Venice International Film Festival on 3 September 2026, and had its North American premiere at the 53rd Telluride Film Festival. It was selected for the Camden International Film Festival, where it will screen on 19 September.

It was screened in Documentary Competition section of the Zurich Film Festival on 26 September 2026.

It will compete in the Documentary Competition at the 2026 BFI London Film Festival on 13 October 2026, and at 62nd Chicago International Film Festival on 15 October. It will be presented in Documentary Features International at the Hot Springs Documentary Film Festival on 17 October, and at New Hampshire Film Festival on 18 October, and at the Hawaiʻi International Film Festival on 25 October. On 31 October it will be screened at the 49th Denver Film Festival.

The film will be released by ESPN in 2027.

== Accolades ==
Award	Date of ceremony	Category	Recipient(s)	Result	Ref.
Venice International Film Festival	12 September 2026	Armani Beauty Audience Award (Venice Spotlight)	Sumo: Spirit Weighs Nothing	Nominated	
BFI London Film Festival	18 October 2026	Grierson Awards	Sumo: Spirit Weighs Nothing	Pending	
