= John Gunning (journalist) =

Irish sports journalist and sports commentator

- Born: 1973 or 1974 (age 51–52); Galway, County Galway, Ireland
- Education: Mary Immaculate College
- Occupation(s): Sports journalist, sports commentator

John Gunning is an Irish sports journalist and sports commentator living and working in Japan. He is particularly known for his coverage of sumo, in which he previously competed at amateur level.

== Early life and education ==
Gunning is from Castlerea, County Roscommon, Ireland. He developed a fondness for American football as it was exotic to him. Gunning attended Mary Immaculate College in Limerick, where he earned a degree in media and communications. While at university, he and some classmates were in a rock band named Libido. Gunning lived in both the United States and Italy for a time.

== Career ==
Gunning first visited Japan in 2000 for a two-week holiday with a friend and fell in love with the country. He quit his job upon returning to Ireland, and nine months later was living and working in Osaka teaching English. In order to make friends and facilitate learning the Japanese language, Gunning joined a local sports team called the Red Flags, not knowing that they were tied to a communist party.

Upon moving to Tokyo, Gunning gave up association football due to injuries and took up sumo in 2004 at the age of 30. He joined Komatsuryu Dojo, one of the oldest sumo clubs in the country for young wrestlers who want to go on to join professional sumo stables. He decided to double his weight to 120 kilos and focused on power as he lacked speed. He competed in amateur sumo for a decade, suffering injuries such as concussions, breaking his humerus, fracturing his skull, and breaking several teeth. Gunning represented Ireland at three Sumo World Championships; 2007 in Thailand, 2008 in Estonia, and 2012 in Hong Kong, but in his words he was unable to translate his results seen in training into the tournaments, and so retired in 2012.

When an acquaintance was leaving his job as a columnist at The Daily Yomiuri, he recommended Gunning. At short notice, Gunning called up the rikishi he knew for exclusive comments and turned in a piece within 30 hours. He then wrote a column for the newspaper for a few years. Gunning got a job at NHK in a similar manner: someone was leaving and someone else knew of his work and offered him a job. He works on various programmes for the Japanese public broadcaster, including as an English-language commentator on its live sumo tournament broadcasts.

Gunning founded Inside Sport Japan in 2017, where he is the content director. He created it after years of finding what he felt were great sport stories but having no outlet to tell them as they did not fit with a daily newspaper for various reasons. Another goal was to gather journalists who are doing good work, but who have small audiences, and bring them together in one place. The company covers sports such as sumo, American football, rugby, and basketball, but also those that are more less well-covered, such as women's sports or parasports. Also in 2017, Gunning was asked by The Japan Times to write a column on sumo in relation to their 120th anniversary revamping. He said it was an honour to be asked as their website was the first place he had read about the sport when he first moved to Japan. He has continued to write weekly for the newspaper on sumo.

Gunning acknowledges that by working in Japan he is not as free to say what he wants as he would be in other countries, but said "I try to push the envelope and ask important questions." For example, he supports female participation in sumo and is outspoken on what he believes is the inevitable issue of chronic traumatic encephalopathy in the sport, the latter related to the injuries he experienced first hand while competing.
