= Nishikifuji Ryūsei =

Japanese professional sumo wrestler

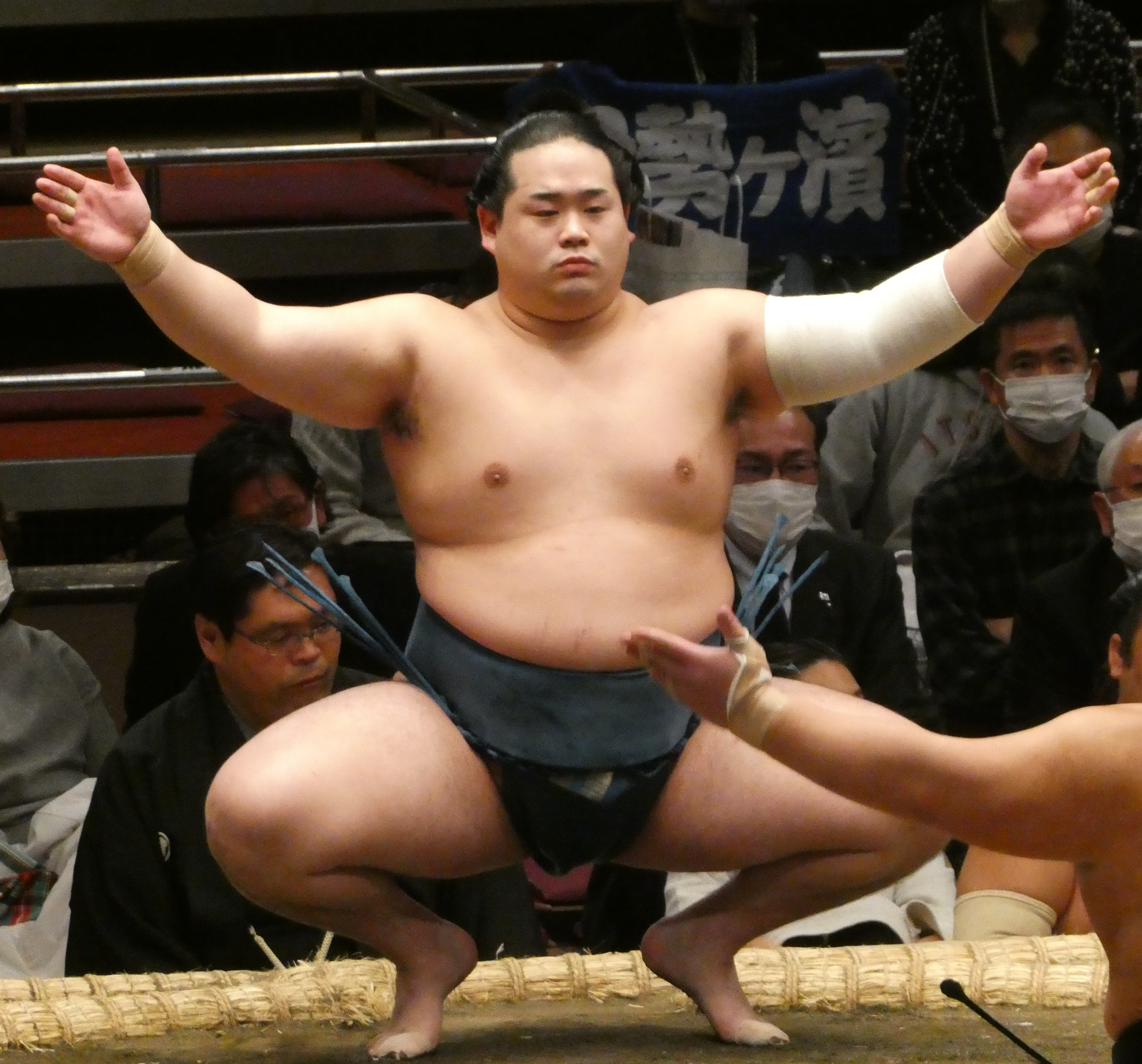

Personal information
- Native name: 錦富士 隆聖
- Born: Ryūsei Ogasawara; July 22, 1996 (age 30) Towada, Aomori Prefecture, Japan
- Height: 1.84 m (6 ft 1/2 in)
- Weight: 155 kg (342 lb; 24.4 st)

Sport
- Sport: Sumo
- Rank: See below
- University team: Kindai University
- Heya: Isegahama
- Debut: September 2016
- Highest rank: Maegashira 3 (May, 2023)
- Championships: 4; 1 (Jūryō); 1 (Makushita); 1 (Jonidan); 1 (Jonokuchi)
- Special Prizes: 1 Fighting spirit
- Updated on 24 September 2023

Nishikifuji Ryūsei (Japanese: 錦富士 隆聖; born 22 July 1996 as Ryūsei Ogasawara (小笠原 隆聖, Ogasawara Ryūsei)) is a Japanese professional sumo wrestler from Towada. He wrestles for the Isegahama stable and made his debut in September 2016 and reached the top division in July 2022. His highest rank has been maegashira 3. With the exception of the sandanme division, Nishikifuji has won championships in each of the four lower divisions of professional sumo, as well as a jūryō championship. He also earned a special prize in his makuuchi debut in July 2022.

== Early life and sumo beginnings ==
Born in Towada, Aomori, Nishikifuji began to wrestle in his third year of elementary school at Towada's Sanbongi Elementary School because his mother encouraged him to take up the sport, although he himself was reluctant to get involved in wrestling. Nishikifuji continued to practice throughout his time at Towada's Junior High School, where he placed in the top eight at the National Junior High School Sumo Tournament in his sixth year. In senior high school, he went on to Sanbongi Agricultural High School's Agricultural Machinery Department, a school famous for its sumo club, alongside Ōnoshō, and while there he placed third in the individual division in the National High School Usa Tournament. After high school, he joined Kindai University alongside Midorifuji, but dropped out and the two decided to turn pro at the same time in 2016, both joining Isegahama stable. Since then, he and Midorifuji have maintained a friendly rivalry.

== Career ==
During the early years of his career, Nishikifuji wrestled under his real name Ogasawara and first served as tsukebito (assistant) to senior wrestler Aminishiki. In his first jonokuchi tournament, he tied with Midorifuji (then named Ihara) and the two faced off for the title in a playoff on the final day, with Nishikifuji emerging victorious. After his first two tournaments, he was given the shikona, or ring name, Nishikifuji (錦富士), from the kanji in Aminishiki's shikona (錦), because he took him under his wing and helped train him; and from his master (former yokozuna Asahifuji) old ring name (富士). After Aminishiki's retirement in 2019, Nishikifuji served as Terutsuyoshi's tsukebito. Then promoted to jonidan, Nishikifuji again faced Midorifuji for the division title, and the two clashed again in the playoff, with Nishikifuji emerging victorious once again. Their senior wrestler Terunofuji commented that the Isegahama stable particularly enjoyed seeing the two fight against each other.

In September 2019, Nishikifuji was ranked makushita 3, putting him in a position for possible promotion to the jūryō division. He however injured his left elbow and had to undergo surgery during the same month. The period of recovery following the operation forced him to sit out the November tournament. During this period, he particularly thanked his mentor Aminishiki for his care. In March 2020, Nishikifuji claimed the makushita championship with a perfect record, having defeated Kyokusōten who was also undefeated in his first 6 bouts. In August of the same year, Nishikifuji's promotion to the jūryō division was announced, coinciding with his stablemate Terunofuji winning the July 2020 makuuchi tournament championship on his return to the top division. Commenting on these two championships won by the Isegahama stable during the same period, Nishikifuji confided that he and Terunofuji hoped to create a "whirlwind" by winning their respective divisions. However, following two poor tournaments, Nishikifuji was demoted to the makushita division for the January 2021 tournament. During this tournament, Nishikifuji competed for the makushita championship despite losing on Day 2 to Ichiyamamoto. Surprisingly, the playoff to determine the division winner was between nine wrestlers tied to just one defeat, a first since the 1996 July tournament in Nagoya. Despite winning his first match against Shōhōryū, Nishikifuji was defeated by Shiba and was eliminated early from the title race, which that year went to Sakigake (from Shibatayama stable). His 6–1 score, however, saw Nishikifuji promoted back to the jūryō division.

In May 2022, Nishikifuji won the jūryō championship in a playoff against Oitekaze wrestler Daiamami. His championship also coincided with his stablemate yokozuna Terunofuji's seventh top division championship. The May 2022 championship was also the last tournament before the danpatsu-shiki ceremony of Nishikifuji's mentor, Aminishiki, which took place on the 29th of the same month. Commenting on his mentor's retirement, he shared his satisfaction at having won the championship before the ceremony.

Due to his jūryō championship the previous tournament, Nishikifuji was promoted to sumo's top division, debuting in the rank of maegashira 17. At the time of his promotion, he confided his desire to face his former classmate Ōnoshō, who had made his debut in the makuuchi division in May 2017. He went on to get double-digit wins, finishing the basho with a 10-5 record. That same tournament, he was granted the Fighting Spirit special prize, for finishing his debut in the top division with a strong winning record. During the May 2023 tournament, Nishikifuji injured the ligaments in his right leg and finished the tournament with a poor result. His condition did not improve as the July tournament of the same year approached, stating that he felt his participation was "forced".

Nishikifuji withdrew on Day 12 of the January 2026 tournament, after what his stablemaster described as returning neck and elbow pain stemming from earlier injuries.

== Fighting style ==
Nishikifuji is a yotsu-sumo wrestler who favours clinch fighting techniques as opposed to pushing and thrusting (oshi-sumo). His preferred grip on his opponent's mawashi or belt is hidari-yotsu, a right hand outside, left hand inside position. His favourite winning kimarite or technique is a straightforward yori-kiri, or force out. However, Nishikifuji also worked to develop his thrusts and pushes techniques. It has been noted that Nishikifuji has great difficulty maintaining his weight during tournaments, forcing him to take his weight gains more seriously. On his promotion to the rank of jūryō, he also communicated about his endurance work, which he considered weak and wished to strengthen.

== Personal life ==
A few days before the start of the May 2023 tournament, Nishikifuji married a 24-year-old Japanese woman that he had been dating for a year and a half. The ceremony was held at Tokyo's Tomioka Hachiman Shrine, the same shrine where both his stablemaster Isegahama (the 63rd yokozuna Asahifuji) and his stablemate Terunofuji were married. Shortly before the start of the November 2023 tournament, the couple announced the birth of twins on 13 October.

== Career record ==
Nishikifuji Ryusei
Year	January Hatsu basho, Tokyo	March Haru basho, Osaka	May Natsu basho, Tokyo	July Nagoya basho, Nagoya	September Aki basho, Tokyo	November Kyūshū basho, Fukuoka
2016	x	x	x	x	(Maezumō)	East Jonokuchi #10; 7–0–P; Champion
2017	East Jonidan #10; 7–0–P; Champion	East Sandanme #19; 3–4	West Sandanme #38; 5–2	East Sandanme #13; 4–3	West Sandanme #2; 4–3	West Makushita #52; 6–1
2018	West Makushita #23; 1–5–1	West Makushita #47; 5–2	West Makushita #30; 4–3	East Makushita #23; 2–5	West Makushita #37; 5–2	West Makushita #24; 5–2
2019	West Makushita #13; 3–4	West Makushita #17; 5–2	East Makushita #11; 4–3	West Makushita #8; 5–2	East Makushita #3; 1–4–2	West Makushita #18; Sat out due to injury 0–0–7
2020	West Makushita #58; 4–3	East Makushita #49; 7–0; Champion	East Makushita #3; Tournament Cancelled; State of Emergency; 0–0–0	East Makushita #3; 5–2	West Jūryō #13; 7–8	West Jūryō #13; 3–12
2021	West Makushita #5; 6–1–PP	West Jūryō #12; 7–8	West Jūryō #12; 8–7	East Jūryō #11; 8–7	East Jūryō #9; 10–5	East Jūryō #4; 5–10
2022	East Jūryō #9; 10–5	West Jūryō #5; 7–8	West Jūryō #6; 11–4–P; Champion	East Maegashira #17; 10–5; F	East Maegashira #10; 10–5	West Maegashira #5; 9–6
2023	East Maegashira #4; 4–11	West Maegashira #10; 10–5	West Maegashira #3; 3–12	West Maegashira #8; 5–10	West Maegashira #13; 5–10	West Maegashira #16; 6–9
2024	East Jūryō #2; 10–5	East Maegashira #14; 8–7	West Maegashira #12; 5–10	East Maegashira #17; 6–9	East Maegashira #17; 8–7	West Maegashira #14; 6–9
2025	East Maegashira #17; 9–6	East Maegashira #13; 0–2–13	East Jūryō #5; 5–10	East Jūryō #9; 10–3–2	West Jūryō #3; 11–4	East Maegashira #15; 9–6
2026	West Maegashira #11; 6–6–3	West Maegashira #14; 9–6	West Maegashira #9; 5–10	East Maegashira #13; 10–5	West Maegashira #7; 7–8	West Maegashira #8; 8–7
Record given as wins–losses–absences Top division champion Top division runner-up Retired Non-participation Jūryō Lower divisions Sanshō key: F=Fighting spirit; O=Outstanding performance; T=Technique Also shown: ★=Kinboshi; P=Playoff(s); Divisions: Makuuchi — Jūryō — Makushita — Sandanme — Jonidan — Jonokuchi Makuuchi ranks: Yokozuna — Ōzeki — Sekiwake — Komusubi — Maegashira

== See also ==
- Glossary of sumo terms
- List of active sumo wrestlers
- List of active special prize winners
- List of sumo second division champions
