= Midorifuji Kazunari =

Japanese professional sumo wrestler

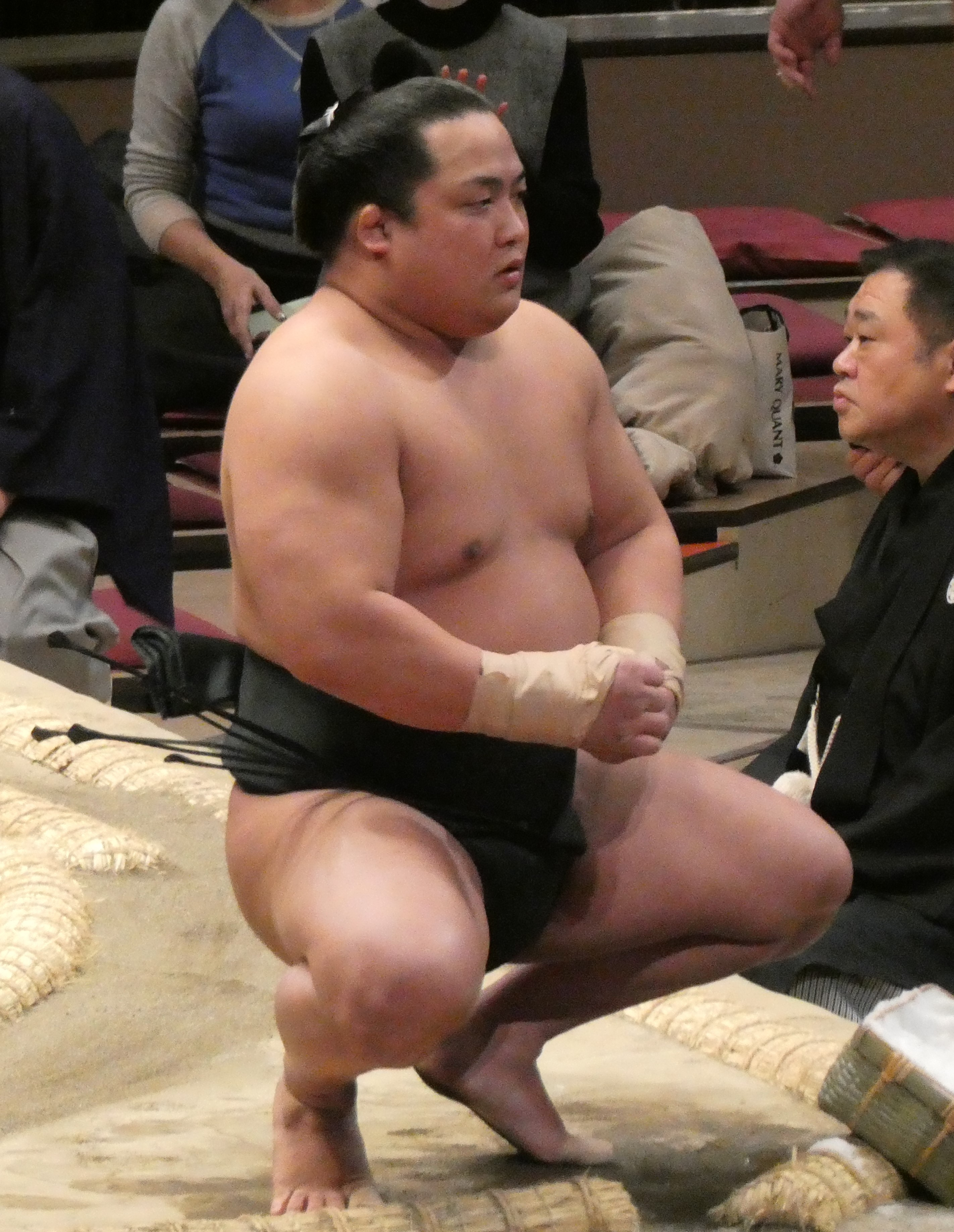

Personal information
- Native name: 翠富士 一成
- Born: Kazunari Ihara; August 30, 1996 (age 30) Yaizu, Shizuoka, Japan
- Height: 1.74 m (5 ft 8 1/2 in)
- Weight: 115 kg (254 lb; 18.1 st)

Sport
- Sport: Sumo
- Rank: see below
- University team: Kindai University
- Heya: Isegahama
- Debut: September, 2016
- Highest rank: Maegashira 1 (September, 2022)
- Championships: 1 (Juryo)
- Special Prizes: 1 (Technique)
- Updated on 24 September 2023

Midorifuji Kazunari (翠富士 一成; born Kazunari Ihara (庵原 一成, Ihara Kazunari) on August 30, 1996) is a Japanese professional sumo wrestler from Yaizu, Shizuoka. Known for being a katasukashi specialist, he debuted in sumo wrestling in September 2016 and made his makuuchi debut in January 2021. His highest rank has been maegashira 1. He wrestles for Isegahama stable.

== Early life ==
Born in Yaizu, Shizuoka, Kazunari grew up in a single-mother household. He began participating in sumo from elementary school and notably wrestled at the Wanpaku National Championship. After this initial experience he stopped practising sumo before entering his third year in junior high school at Yaizu Junior High School, where he placed in the national team top 8 at the National Junior High School Sumo Championships. In his second year at Hiryū Senior High School, he defeated future Takakeishō of the Saitama Sakae High School team at the All-Japan High School Sumo Tournament, preventing Saitama Sakae from winning a fourth consecutive title and winning the first medal (third-place) of Hiryū High School in a sumo team tournament. Individually, he also won the All-Japan Junior Weight Classification Championships in the under-80kg category and the National Championships in the under-100kg category, respectively. He attended Kindai University, where in his first year he won the National Student Sumo Individual Weight-class Championship in the under 100 kg category. He however left during his second year, and eventually he returned to his hometown. It was during a visit there by the head coach of Isegahama stable, the former yokozuna Asahifuji, that he was persuaded to join professional sumo. Midorifuji turned pro at the same time as Nishikifuji, his former classmate from Kindai University, the two being in a friendly rivalry ever since.

== Career ==
=== Early career ===
Initially wrestling under his real surname Ihara (庵原), Midorifuji began his first real tournament in jonokuchi in November 2016. At the end of the 7 official days of competition, he and his stablemate Nishikifuji (then named Ogasawara) were both unbeaten and tied for the championship. Nishikifuji nevertheless won the championship by yoritaoshi. For the January 2017 tournament, Midorifuji received his current shikona, or ring name, to evoke, with the kanji 翠 (meaning green), jade, a stone that shines brighter when polished, in the same way that a wrestler becomes better through practice. During this tournament, Midorifuji and Nishikifuji faced off again in the championship playoff. Although Midorifuji prepared his fight with his senior, and then ōzeki, Terunofuji, he lost again to Nishikifuji. In January 2020 ranked at makushita 2 he earned promotion to the sekitori ranks for the first time with a 5-2 record. This promotion made him the first sumo wrestler from Shizuoka Prefecture to become a new jūryō since Tochihiryū in the March tournament of 2013, and the second sekitori from Yaizu, after Katayama in 2004. However, he still weighed barely 100 kg (220 lb) and turned in a losing 7-8 record in his jūryō division debut. He managed to remain in the division, and in September 2020 he produced an 11-4 record. In the following November 2020 tournament, Midorifuji notably scored a victory over Jōkōryū on Day 13 using the rare kimarite (winning technique) zubuneri ("head pivot throw"), a first at this level of competition since Kyokushūzan used it in January 1996. In total, Midorifuji also used the katasukashi kimarite ("under-shoulder swing down") 4 times during the tournament. Midorifuji ended with a 10-5 score, enough to earn him his first career championship (yūshō) after a playoff win over Kyokushūhō. This championship victory also saw him promoted to sumo's top division, makuuchi, for the next tournament in January 2021.

=== Makuuchi career ===
Midorifuji was the fifth top division wrestler from Shizuoka Prefecture since World War II and the first since Sagatsukasa in 2010. Ahead of his debut he said he hoped to emulate fellow small wrestlers Enhō and Terutsuyoshi. In his top division debut in January 2021 Midorifuji scored nine wins against six losses and won the ginō-shō or Technique prize, with a win over Tobizaru on Day 15. Midorifuji is only the seventh wrestler to receive this award in his makuuchi debut and the first since Tochinohana in May 2000. Five of his nine wins were by the kimarite of katasukashi, or under-shoulder swing down. On the subject of the use of this kimarite, many commentators have begun to refer to this technique as Midorifuji's speciality, referring to it in particular as Denkanohōtō (伝家の宝刀), meaning 'family heirloom' or 'family tradition', since it was also used extensively by Midorifuji's master, Isegahama (former yokozuna Asahifuji), and by Midorifuji's senior in his stable, Aminishiki, who is also described as a technical genius. Midorifuji said he was happy to have received the award, but regretted that he had not managed ten wins.

This performance saw him promoted to the rank of maegasahira 10 for the March 2021 tournament, where he produced a 5–10 record. He withdrew from the May 2021 tournament due to a herniated disc in his back, requiring two months of treatment. Upon his comeback in July 2021, ranked in the jūryō division, he could only manage a 6-9 record. In March 2022 a 12–3 score saw him promoted back to the top division for the May tournament.
During the March 2023 tournament, Midorifuji first achieved his best performance in makuuchi by winning five bouts in a row. He then went to lead the honbasho, recording ten wins in ten matches and securing a comfortable lead against Daieishō, the wrestler closest to his score, with two wins ahead of the former. However, he fell on the eleventh day with a defeat against Wakamotoharu, and then on the twelfth day against Wakatakakage. On the fourteenth day, Daieishō handed him his fourth consecutive defeat, which took Midorifuji out of the title race. Midorifuji was listed as a potential recipient of a Fighting Spirit award on Day 15, but it was contingent on an eleventh win. Midorifuji lost to Shōdai and did not receive the award. Commenting on his performance at the tournament, Midorifuji expressed his joy at having made it this far in the title race and considered the tournament a good experience.

At the July tournament, Midorifuji won against the new ōzeki Kirishima, in a demanding match of about two minutes, marked by a rare "mawashi matta" (まわし待った), or mawashi break, a pause during which the gyōji reattaches a wrestler's mawashi.

During the preparations for the September 2023 tournament, Midorifuji was ranked as the lightest makuuchi wrestler, and was also the lightest wrestler ranked as sekitori, ex-æquo with Kihō.

During the November 2023 tournament, Midorifuji had a notable match with Hokuseihō on day seven; the match being between the lightest and tallest wrestler in the division. The match also received attention after lasting a total of 6 minutes 40 seconds, and being marked by a very rare mizu-iri (water break), an event that had not happened in makuuchi for 8 years, since day fourteen of the March 2015 tournament during the match between Terunofuji and Ichinojō. During the 2025 May tournament he recorded an unusual run of nine consecutive defeats since the first day of the tournament, which ended on the tenth day with his victory over Chiyoshōma, before proceeding to win his last 6 matches to give him a record of 6-9. It was announced that he would withdraw from the March 2026 tournament due to heart failure, with medical certificates saying he would require one month of treatment.

== Fighting style ==
Midorifuji's Japan Sumo Association profile lists his favourite techniques as oshi (pushing) and katasukashi (under shoulder swing down). He has won 25 percent of his career matches to date with the latter technique, compared to an average among other wrestlers of just one percent. In November 2020 he beat Jōkōryū with the rare technique of zubuneri, or head pivot throw, which had not been seen at sekitori level in 22 years.

== Personal life ==
During the January 2024 tournament Midorifuji announced that he had gotten married and his wedding ceremony (held the following month, on Valentine's Day) took place at Tokyo's Tomioka Hachiman Shrine; the same shrine where both his stablemaster and his stablemates Terunofuji and Nishikifuji were married. He and his wife, whom he met because she is the daughter of one of his stable's patrons, have a daughter born in autumn 2023.

== Career record ==
Midorifuji Kazunari
Year	January Hatsu basho, Tokyo	March Haru basho, Osaka	May Natsu basho, Tokyo	July Nagoya basho, Nagoya	September Aki basho, Tokyo	November Kyūshū basho, Fukuoka
2016	x	x	x	x	(Maezumō)	West Jonokuchi #21; 7–0–P
2017	West Jonidan #10; 7–0–P	West Sandanme #19; 5–2	West Makushita #57; 4–3	West Makushita #46; 3–4	East Makushita #57; 4–3	East Makushita #46; 4–3
2018	East Makushita #39; 3–4	West Makushita #48; 6–1	West Makushita #20; 2–5	East Makushita #36; 5–2	East Makushita #23; 3–4	West Makushita #32; 4–3
2019	West Makushita #26; 4–3	East Makushita #19; 4–3	East Makushita #13; 4–3	West Makushita #11; 5–2	East Makushita #4; 2–5	East Makushita #12; 6–1
2020	East Makushita #2; 5–2	West Jūryō #11; 7–8	East Jūryō #12; Tournament Cancelled; State of Emergency; 0–0–0	East Jūryō #12; 8–7	West Jūryō #10; 11–4	Jūryō #2; 10–5–P; Champion
2021	West Maegashira #14; 9–6; T	East Maegashira #10; 5–10	West Maegashira #15; Sat out due to injury 0–0–15	West Jūryō #9; 6–9	West Jūryō #11; 8–7	East Jūryō #8; 7–8
2022	West Jūryō #8; 9–6	East Jūryō #6; 12–3	West Maegashira #16; 9–6	West Maegashira #11; 10–5	West Maegashira #1; 7–8	West Maegashira #3; 8–7
2023	West Maegashira #3; 6–9	West Maegashira #5; 10–5	West Maegashira #1; 6–9	East Maegashira #3; 4–11	East Maegashira #9; 10–5	West Maegashira #5; 9–6
2024	East Maegashira #2; 5–10	East Maegashira #5; 7–8	West Maegashira #6; 5–10	West Maegashira #10; 8–7	West Maegashira #8; 7–8	East Maegashira #9; 7–8
2025	East Maegashira #11; 7–8	East Maegashira #11; 9–6	West Maegashira #9; 6–9	East Maegashira #12; 9–6	East Maegashira #9; 7–8	East Maegashira #9; 6–9
2026	East Maegashira #12; 6–9	East Maegashira #15; Sat out due to injury 0–0–15	West Jūryō #10; 9–6	East Jūryō #8; 8–7	East Jūryō #7; 7–8	East Jūryō #8; 7–8
Record given as wins–losses–absences Top division champion Top division runner-up Retired Non-participation Jūryō Lower divisions Sanshō key: F=Fighting spirit; O=Outstanding performance; T=Technique Also shown: ★=Kinboshi; P=Playoff(s); Divisions: Makuuchi — Jūryō — Makushita — Sandanme — Jonidan — Jonokuchi Makuuchi ranks: Yokozuna — Ōzeki — Sekiwake — Komusubi — Maegashira

== See also ==
- Glossary of sumo terms
- List of active sumo wrestlers
- List of active special prize winners
- List of sumo second division champions
