= Tsurugishō Momotarō =

Japanese sumo wrestler

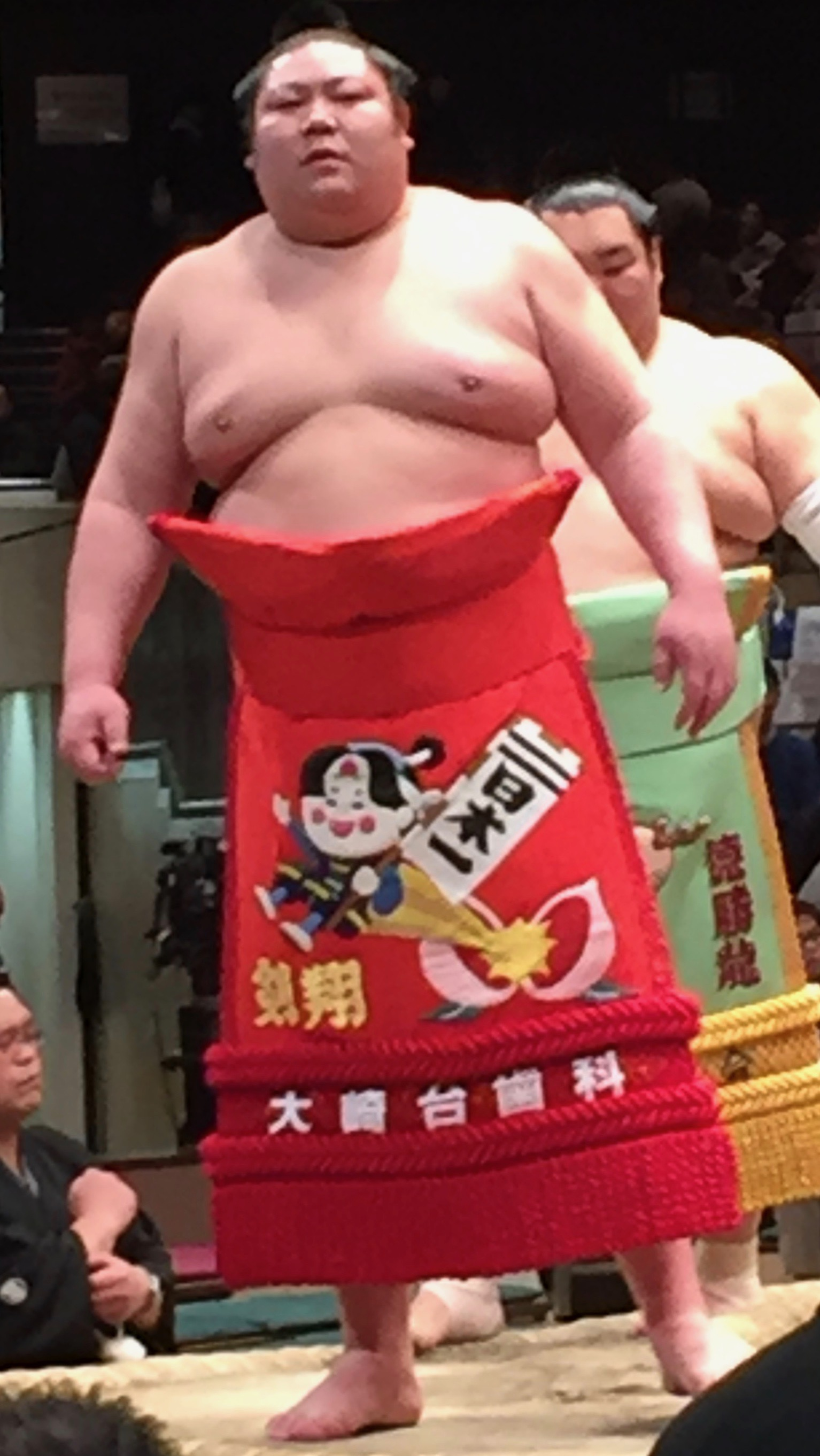
- Tsurugishō in 2017

Personal information
- Native name: 剣翔 桃太郎
- Born: Kentarō Abiko; July 27, 1991 (age 35) Katsushika, Tokyo
- Height: 1.85 m (6 ft 1 in)
- Weight: 200 kg (440 lb; 31 st)

Sport
- Sport: Sumo
- Rank: See below
- University team: Nihon University
- Retired: April 2026
- Heya: Oitekaze
- Debut: January 2014
- Highest rank: Maegashira 6 (March 2024)
- Championships: 2 (Jūryō); 1 (Makushita); 1 (Jonidan); 1 (Jonokuchi)
- Special Prizes: 1 (Fighting Spirit)
- Updated on April 6, 2026

Tsurugishō Momotarō (Japanese: 剣翔 桃太郎; born 27 July 1991 as Kentarō Abiko (安彦 剣太郎, Abiko Kentarō)) is a Japanese former professional sumo wrestler from Katsushika, Tokyo. He is a graduate of Nihon University. His highest rank was maegashira 6. He won a Fighting Spirit Prize in his debut tournament in the top makuuchi division in September 2019. He was a member of Oitekaze stable and retired in April 2026.

== Career ==
Tsurugishō was an amateur wrestler at Nihon University, and although he did not win an individual title he was on the winning team in the Student Yokozuna 2012 championships. He entered professional sumo in January 2014. He rose up the ranks quickly, winning championships in the jonokuchi, jonidan and makushita divisions before slowing down a little and spending eight tournaments in makushita. He won promotion to the jūryō division after the November 2015 tournament, and adopted a new shikona, having previously fought under his family name of Abiko. He wanted a two-kanji name to make it easy to remember, and suggested "Ken" from his own first name, combined with the "shō" suffix common at his Oitekaze stable. However, as "kenshō" is the name used for the prize money awarded after a bout it was therefore unavailable, and he used the reading "Tsurugi" instead.

He took some time to settle in jūryō, recording a succession of 7–8 and 8–7 scores, before suffering a setback in March 2018 with his first double-digit loss score of 4–11. However he recovered to post 11–4 in the following tournament, and in July 2019 he won the jūryō championship with a 13–2 record to earn promotion to the top makuuchi division. He was the eighth member of Oitekaze stable to win promotion to the top division since his stablemaster, ex-maegashira Daishōyama, opened the heya in 1998. He had a strong debut, scoring double-digit wins and staying in contention for the championship with a win over Takarafuji on Day 13. Although he lost his last two matches he was awarded the Fighting Spirit Prize on Day 15. He was promoted to a new highest rank of maegashira 7 for the November 2019 tournament, but could only score 6–9 there. He suffered a left knee injury in January 2020, but competed until the end of the tournament, again scoring 6–9. He entered in March but withdrew on Day 5, with the medical certificate citing a left knee anterior cruciate ligament injury. By the time of the next tournament, held in July 2020, he was back in jūryō. In January 2021 he won his second jūryō championship with a 12–3 record. His stablemate Daieishō won the makuuchi championship in the same tournament. This was the first time that the top two divisions had been won by members of the same stable since Takasago stable's Asashōryū and Tōki in November 2005. This saw him promoted back to the top division for the March 2021 tournament. He returned to jūryō after scoring only 5–10 in September 2021.

At the September 2023 tournament, Tsurugishō put in a good performance, securing his place in the makuuchi division with an eighth victory on day eleven. This tournament, in which he achieved the fastest kachi-koshi score of his career, held particular significance for him, having learned of the death of his grandmother during the competition.

On Day 4 of the March 2024 tournament, Tsurugishō appeared to reinjure his left knee in his match against Hiradoumi and had to be taken away from the dohyō in a wheelchair. He withdrew the following day, with his medical certificate stating that he would miss two months due to injuries to his left ACL, MCL and meniscus. At the following tournament, ranked at the bottom of Makuuchi, he could only manage 3 wins, which caused him to drop down to the Jūryō division for the July tournament.

Prior to the January 2026 tournament, Tsurugishō told reporters that he would retire if he dropped down to the makushita division (he was ranked in jūryō at the time), and said that he was determined to keep his sekitori status and remain an active wrestler.

At the March 2026 tournament, Tsurugishō suffered from ACL, MCL, and meniscus tears in his left knee in addition to pain in his right ankle and back. Because of these injuries, Tsurugishō was unable to manage a single win throughout the tournament, suffering the rare zenpai, or winless tournament. This marked the first time a jūryō wrestler finished 0–15 since Fujiazuma in November 2020, and the first time a sekitori had suffered this fate since maegashira Terutsuyoshi in November 2022. His winless record meant that Tsurugishō's demotion to makushita, a division he had not fought in for over 10 years, was certain. Early April, he announced his retirement following his final jūryō tournament. His hair-cutting ceremony, which was also held as his wedding ceremony, took place at a hotel in Tokyo on June 6. On that occasion, he told the press that he had opened a yakiniku restaurant.

== Fighting style ==
Tsurugishō is a yotsu-sumo wrestler, who prefers grabbing the mawashi to pushing or thrusting at his opponents. His favoured grip is migi-yotsu, a left arm outside, right hand inside position. His most common winning kimarite or technique is yori-kiri or force out.

== Personal life ==
Prior to the start of the January 2026 tournament, Tsurugishō announced his engagement to Yūka, a Japanese flight attendant. Their marriage would be registered on 11 January, with the wedding reception scheduled for June 2026. Tsurugishō told reporters at the press conference for his engagement that Yūka suggested registering the Ryōgoku Kokugikan as their permanent address on the marriage certificate. "Apparently you can register your permanent address anywhere," he said, adding that he believed it was the first time a marriage certificate listed the Kokugikan on the registration.

== Career record ==
Tsurugishō Momotarō
Year	January Hatsu basho, Tokyo	March Haru basho, Osaka	May Natsu basho, Tokyo	July Nagoya basho, Nagoya	September Aki basho, Tokyo	November Kyūshū basho, Fukuoka
2014	(Maezumo)	West Jonokuchi #12; 7–0; Champion	West Jonidan #11; 7–0; Champion	East Sandanme #21; 6–1	East Makushita #42; 7–0; Champion	East Makushita #4; 3–4
2015	East Makushita #8; 5–2	East Makushita #4; 4–3	West Makushita #3; 4–3	West Makushita #2; 3–4	West Makushita #5; 5–2	East Makushita #1; 5–2
2016	East Jūryō #12; 8–7	West Jūryō #9; 7–8	West Jūryō #10; 8–7	East Jūryō #10; 8–7	East Jūryō #9; 8–7	West Jūryō #5; 7–8
2017	West Jūryō #8; 8–7	East Jūryō #8; 8–7	West Jūryō #6; 6–9	West Jūryō #9; 8–7	East Jūryō #8; 7–8	West Jūryō #8; 8–7
2018	East Jūryō #6; 7–8	West Jūryō #7; 4–11	East Jūryō #14; 11–4	East Jūryō #7; 7–8	East Jūryō #8; 7–8	West Jūryō #8; 6–9
2019	West Jūryō #11; 8–7	West Jūryō #6; 6–9	East Jūryō #10; 9–6	East Jūryō #6; 13–2; Champion	East Maegashira #14; 10–5; F	East Maegashira #7; 6–9
2020	East Maegashira #12; 6–9	East Maegashira #15; 1–4–10	West Jūryō #7; Tournament Cancelled; State of Emergency; 0–0–0	West Jūryō #7; 7–8	West Jūryō #8; 7–8	East Jūryō #9; 8–7
2021	East Jūryō #8; 12–3; Champion	West Maegashira #14; 9–6	East Maegashira #8; 4–11	East Maegashira #15; 8–7	West Maegashira #13; 5–10	East Jūryō #1; 9–6
2022	West Maegashira #16; 6–9	West Jūryō #1; 7–8	West Jūryō #2; 10–5	West Maegashira #14; 5–8–2	West Maegashira #15; 5–10	East Jūryō #3; 10–5
2023	East Maegashira #15; 7–8	West Maegashira #16; 8–7	West Maegashira #15; 9–6	West Maegashira #11; 5–10	West Maegashira #16; 8–7	West Maegashira #13; 9–6
2024	East Maegashira #11; 9–6	East Maegashira #6; 2–3–10	East Maegashira #17; 3–12	West Jūryō #5; 7–8	East Jūryō #7; 6–8–1	West Jūryō #7; 10–5
2025	West Jūryō #3; 3–12	East Jūryō #11; 8–7	West Jūryō #9; 7–8	West Jūryō #9; 7–8	West Jūryō #9; 5–10	West Jūryō #11; 7–8
2026	West Jūryō #11; 6–9	West Jūryō #12; 0–15	East Makushita #11; Retired –	x	x	x
Record given as wins–losses–absences Top division champion Top division runner-up Retired Lower divisions Non-participation Sanshō key: F=Fighting spirit; O=Outstanding performance; T=Technique Also shown: ★=Kinboshi; P=Playoff(s); Divisions: Makuuchi — Jūryō — Makushita — Sandanme — Jonidan — Jonokuchi Makuuchi ranks: Yokozuna — Ōzeki — Sekiwake — Komusubi — Maegashira

== See also ==
- Glossary of sumo terms
- List of past sumo wrestlers
- List of the heaviest sumo wrestlers
- List of sumo second division champions
