= 2022 in sumo =

The following are the events in professional sumo during 2022.

== Tournaments ==
=== January ===
Hatsu basho

Ryōgoku Kokugikan, Tokyo, 9 January – 23 January

2022 Hatsu basho results - Makuuchi Division
| W | | L | | A | East | | | Rank | West | | | W | | L | | A |
|---|---|---|---|---|---|---|---|---|---|---|---|---|---|---|---|---|
| 11 | - | 4 | - | 0 | | (Mongolia) | **Terunofuji** | Y | ø | | | 0 | - | 0 | - | 0 |
| 1 | - | 3 | - | 11 | ø | (Japan) | Takakeishō | O | | (Japan) | Shōdai | 6 | - | 9 | - | 0 |
| 13 | - | 2 | - | 0 | | (Japan) | **Mitakeumi** | S | | (Japan) | Takanoshō | 7 | - | 8 | - | 0 |
| 5 | - | 10 | - | 0 | | (Japan) | Meisei | K | | (Japan) | Daieishō | 7 | - | 8 | - | 0 |
| 9 | - | 6 | - | 0 | | (Japan) | **Wakatakakage** | M1 | | (Mongolia) | Kiribayama | 6 | - | 9 | - | 0 |
| 8 | - | 7 | - | 0 | | (Japan) | **Ura** | M2 | | (Mongolia) | **Ichinojō** | 8 | - | 7 | - | 0 |
| 8 | - | 7 | - | 0 | | (Mongolia) | **Tamawashi** | M3 | | (Japan) | Endō | 7 | - | 8 | - | 0 |
| 4 | - | 11 | - | 0 | | (Japan) | Okinoumi | M4 | | (Japan) | Hokutofuji | 6 | - | 9 | - | 0 |
| 10 | - | 5 | - | 0 | | (Japan) | **Ōnoshō** | M5 | | (Mongolia) | Chiyoshōma | 4 | - | 11 | - | 0 |
| 11 | - | 4 | - | 0 | | (Mongolia) | **Hōshōryū** | M6 | | (Japan) | **Abi** | 12 | - | 3 | - | 0 |
| 0 | - | 0 | - | 15 | ø | (Japan) | Takayasu | M7 | | (Japan) | **Takarafuji** | 9 | - | 6 | - | 0 |
| 0 | - | 0 | - | 15 | ø | (Japan) | Hidenoumi | M8 | | (Japan) | Tobizaru | 6 | - | 9 | - | 0 |
| 4 | - | 11 | - | 0 | | (Japan) | Chiyonokuni | M9 | ø | (Japan) | Shimanoumi | 5 | - | 6 | - | 4 |
| 5 | - | 8 | - | 2 | | (Japan) | Myōgiryū | M10 | | (Japan) | Akua | 4 | - | 11 | - | 0 |
| 8 | - | 7 | - | 0 | | (Japan) | **Sadanoumi** | M11 | | (Japan) | Terutsuyoshi | 7 | - | 8 | - | 0 |
| 11 | - | 4 | - | 0 | | (Japan) | **Ishiura** | M12 | | (Japan) | Chiyotairyū | 7 | - | 8 | - | 0 |
| 7 | - | 8 | - | 0 | | (Japan) | Chiyomaru | M13 | | (Japan) | Yutakayama | 6 | - | 9 | - | 0 |
| 11 | - | 4 | - | 0 | | (Japan) | **Kotonowaka** | M14 | | (Japan) | Ichiyamamoto | 5 | - | 10 | - | 0 |
| 9 | - | 6 | - | 0 | | (Japan) | **Wakamotoharu** | M15 | | (Georgia (country)) | Tochinoshin | 7 | - | 8 | - | 0 |
| 8 | - | 7 | - | 0 | | (Bulgaria) | **Aoiyama** | M16 | | (Japan) | Tsurugishō | 6 | - | 9 | - | 0 |
| 8 | - | 7 | - | 0 | | (Japan) | **Kotoekō** | M17 | ø | (Brazil) | Kaisei | 5 | - | 7 | - | 3 |
| 7 | - | 8 | - | 0 | | (Japan) | Ōhō | M18 | ø | | | 0 | - | 0 | - | 0 |

ø - Indicates a pull-out or absent rank
**winning record in bold**
**Yūshō Winner**

=== March ===
Haru basho

Osaka Prefectural Gymnasium, Osaka, 13 March – 27 March

2022 Haru basho results - Makuuchi Division
| W | | L | | A | East | | | Rank | West | | | W | | L | | A |
|---|---|---|---|---|---|---|---|---|---|---|---|---|---|---|---|---|
| 3 | - | 3 | - | 9 | ø | (Mongolia) | Terunofuji | Y | ø | | | 0 | - | 0 | - | 0 |
| 9 | - | 6 | - | 0 | | (Japan) | **Shōdai** | O | | (Japan) | **Takakeishō** | 8 | - | 7 | - | 0 |
| 0 | - | 0 | - | 0 | ø | | | O | | (Japan) | **Mitakeumi** | 11 | - | 4 | - | 0 |
| 12 | - | 3 | - | 0 | | (Japan) | **Wakatakakage*** | S | | (Japan) | **Abi** | 8 | - | 7 | - | 0 |
| 4 | - | 11 | - | 0 | | (Japan) | Takanoshō | K | | (Mongolia) | **Hōshōryū** | 8 | - | 7 | - | 0 |
| 8 | - | 7 | - | 0 | | (Japan) | **Daieishō** | M1 | | (Japan) | Ura | 4 | - | 11 | - | 0 |
| 9 | - | 6 | - | 0 | | (Mongolia) | **Ichinojō** | M2 | | (Mongolia) | Tamawashi | 7 | - | 8 | - | 0 |
| 6 | - | 9 | - | 0 | | (Japan) | Ōnoshō | M3 | | (Japan) | Meisei | 1 | - | 14 | - | 0 |
| 10 | - | 5 | - | 0 | | (Mongolia) | **Kiribayama** | M4 | | (Japan) | **Endō** | 8 | - | 7 | - | 0 |
| 6 | - | 9 | - | 0 | | (Japan) | Takarafuji | M5 | | (Japan) | Ishiura | 2 | - | 7 | - | 6 |
| 9 | - | 6 | - | 0 | | (Japan) | **Hokutofuji** | M6 | | (Japan) | **Kotonowaka** | 11 | - | 4 | - | 0 |
| 12 | - | 3 | - | 0 | | (Japan) | **Takayasu** | M7 | | (Japan) | Okinoumi | 5 | - | 10 | - | 0 |
| 5 | - | 10 | - | 0 | | (Mongolia) | Chiyoshōma | M8 | | (Japan) | Sadanoumi | 5 | - | 10 | - | 0 |
| 9 | - | 6 | - | 0 | | (Japan) | **Tobizaru** | M9 | | (Japan) | **Wakamotoharu** | 9 | - | 6 | - | 0 |
| 8 | - | 7 | - | 0 | | (Japan) | **Shimanoumi** | M10 | | (Bulgaria) | Aoiyama | 7 | - | 8 | - | 0 |
| 7 | - | 8 | - | 0 | | (Japan) | Myōgiryū | M11 | | (Japan) | **Terutsuyoshi** | 8 | - | 7 | - | 0 |
| 9 | - | 6 | - | 0 | | (Japan) | **Kotoekō** | M12 | | (Japan) | Chiyotairyū | 7 | - | 8 | - | 0 |
| 5 | - | 10 | - | 0 | | (Japan) | Chiyomaru | M13 | | (Japan) | Chiyonokuni | 5 | - | 6 | - | 4 |
| 9 | - | 6 | - | 0 | | (Japan) | **Kotoshōhō** | M14 | | (Japan) | Yutakayama | 7 | - | 8 | - | 0 |
| 4 | - | 11 | - | 0 | | (Japan) | Akua | M15 | | (Georgia (country)) | **Tochinoshin** | 9 | - | 6 | - | 0 |
| 9 | - | 6 | - | 0 | | (Japan) | **Nishikigi** | M16 | | (Philippines) | Kōtokuzan | 7 | - | 8 | - | 0 |
| 7 | - | 8 | - | 0 | | (Japan) | Kagayaki | M17 | | (Japan) | **Ichiyamamoto** | 8 | - | 7 | - | 0 |

ø - Indicates a pull-out or absent rank
**winning record in bold**
**Yūshō Winner**
***Won Playoff**

=== May ===
Natsu basho

Ryōgoku Kokugikan, Tokyo, 8 May – 22 May

2022 Natsu basho results - Makuuchi Division
| W | | L | | A | East | | | Rank | West | | | W | | L | | A |
|---|---|---|---|---|---|---|---|---|---|---|---|---|---|---|---|---|
| 12 | - | 3 | - | 0 | | (Mongolia) | **Terunofuji** | Y | ø | | | 0 | - | 0 | - | 0 |
| 6 | - | 9 | - | 0 | | (Japan) | Mitakeumi | O | | (Japan) | Shōdai | 5 | - | 10 | - | 0 |
| 0 | - | 0 | - | 0 | ø | | | O | | (Japan) | **Takakeishō** | 8 | - | 7 | - | 0 |
| 9 | - | 6 | - | 0 | | (Japan) | **Wakatakakage** | S | | (Japan) | Abi | 7 | - | 8 | - | 0 |
| 8 | - | 7 | - | 0 | | (Mongolia) | **Hōshōryū** | K | | (Japan) | **Daieishō** | 11 | - | 4 | - | 0 |
| 6 | - | 9 | - | 0 | | (Japan) | Takayasu | M1 | ø | (Mongolia) | Ichinojō | 0 | - | 0 | - | 15 |
| 10 | - | 5 | - | 0 | | (Mongolia) | **Kiribayama** | M2 | | (Japan) | **Kotonowaka** | 9 | - | 6 | - | 0 |
| 5 | - | 10 | - | 0 | | (Japan) | Hokutofuji | M3 | | (Mongolia) | **Tamawashi** | 9 | - | 6 | - | 0 |
| 7 | - | 8 | - | 0 | | (Japan) | Endō | M4 | | (Japan) | **Takanoshō** | 11 | - | 4 | - | 0 |
| 2 | - | 4 | - | 9 | ø | (Japan) | Ōnoshō | M5 | | (Japan) | Tobizaru | 7 | - | 8 | - | 0 |
| 9 | - | 5 | - | 1 | ø | (Japan) | **Ura** | M6 | | (Japan) | **Wakamotoharu** | 9 | - | 6 | - | 0 |
| 4 | - | 11 | - | 0 | | (Japan) | Takarafuji | M7 | | (Japan) | Kotoekō | 6 | - | 9 | - | 0 |
| 7 | - | 8 | - | 0 | | (Japan) | Shimanoumi | M8 | | (Japan) | Terutsuyoshi | 5 | - | 10 | - | 0 |
| 6 | - | 9 | - | 0 | | (Japan) | Kotoshōhō | M9 | | (Georgia (country)) | **Tochinoshin** | 8 | - | 7 | - | 0 |
| 9 | - | 6 | - | 0 | | (Japan) | **Okinoumi** | M10 | | (Japan) | **Nishikigi** | 8 | - | 7 | - | 0 |
| 10 | - | 5 | - | 0 | | (Bulgaria) | **Aoiyama** | M11 | | (Mongolia) | Chiyoshōma | 6 | - | 9 | - | 0 |
| 6 | - | 9 | - | 0 | | (Japan) | Myōgiryū | M12 | | (Japan) | **Sadanoumi** | 11 | - | 4 | - | 0 |
| 8 | - | 7 | - | 0 | | (Japan) | **Chiyotairyū** | M13 | | (Japan) | **Meisei** | 8 | - | 7 | - | 0 |
| 6 | - | 9 | - | 0 | | (Japan) | Ōhō | M14 | | (Japan) | Yutakayama | 6 | - | 9 | - | 0 |
| 5 | - | 10 | - | 0 | | (Mongolia) | Azumaryū | M15 | | (Japan) | **Ichiyamamoto** | 8 | - | 7 | - | 0 |
| 0 | - | 0 | - | 15 | ø | (Japan) | Ishiura | M16 | | (Japan) | **Midorifuji** | 9 | - | 6 | - | 0 |
| 2 | - | 13 | - | 0 | | (Japan) | Kōtokuzan | M17 | | (Japan) | Kagayaki | 6 | - | 9 | - | 0 |

ø - Indicates a pull-out or absent rank
**winning record in bold**
**Yūshō Winner**

=== July ===
Nagoya basho

Aichi Prefectural Gymnasium, Nagoya, 10 July – 24 July

2022 Nagoya basho results - Makuuchi Division
| W | | L | | A | East | | | Rank | West | | | W | | L | | A |
|---|---|---|---|---|---|---|---|---|---|---|---|---|---|---|---|---|
| 11 | - | 4 | - | 0 | | (Mongolia) | **Terunofuji** | Y | ø | | | 0 | - | 0 | - | 0 |
| 11 | - | 4 | - | 0 | | (Japan) | **Takakeishō** | O | ø | (Japan) | Mitakeumi | 2 | - | 5 | - | 8 |
| 0 | - | 0 | - | 0 | ø | | | O | | (Japan) | **Shōdai** | 10 | - | 5 | - | 0 |
| 8 | - | 7 | - | 0 | | (Japan) | **Wakatakakage** | S | ø | (Japan) | Daieishō | 6 | - | 7 | - | 2 |
| 9 | - | 6 | - | 0 | | (Mongolia) | **Hōshōryū** | K | | (Japan) | **Abi** | 8 | - | 7 | - | 0 |
| 8 | - | 7 | - | 0 | | (Mongolia) | **Kiribayama** | M1 | ø | (Japan) | Takanoshō | 1 | - | 6 | - | 8 |
| 7 | - | 4 | - | 4 | ø | (Japan) | Kotonowaka | M2 | | (Mongolia) | **Ichinojō** | 12 | - | 3 | - | 0 |
| 5 | - | 8 | - | 2 | ø | (Mongolia) | Tamawashi | M3 | | (Japan) | Ura | 7 | - | 8 | - | 0 |
| 6 | - | 9 | - | 0 | | (Japan) | Wakamotoharu | M4 | ø | (Japan) | Takayasu | 0 | - | 0 | - | 15 |
| 3 | - | 10 | - | 2 | ø | (Japan) | Endō | M5 | | (Japan) | Sadanoumi | 7 | - | 8 | - | 0 |
| 6 | - | 9 | - | 0 | | (Bulgaria) | Aoiyama | M6 | ø | (Japan) | **Tobizaru** | 8 | - | 5 | - | 2 |
| 4 | - | 11 | - | 0 | ø | (Japan) | Okinoumi | M7 | ø | (Japan) | Hokutofuji | 6 | - | 9 | - | 0 |
| 7 | - | 8 | - | 0 | | (Georgia (country)) | Tochinoshin | M8 | ø | (Japan) | **Nishikigi** | 8 | - | 5 | - | 2 |
| 1 | - | 14 | - | 0 | | (Japan) | Shimanoumi | M9 | ø | (Japan) | Kotoekō | 5 | - | 6 | - | 4 |
| 6 | - | 9 | - | 0 | | (Japan) | Chiyotairyū | M10 | | (Japan) | **Meisei** | 9 | - | 6 | - | 0 |
| 5 | - | 6 | - | 4 | ø | (Japan) | Kotoshōhō | M11 | | (Japan) | **Midorifuji** | 10 | - | 5 | - | 0 |
| 6 | - | 9 | - | 0 | | (Japan) | Terutsuyoshi | M12 | | (Japan) | **Takarafuji** | 9 | - | 6 | - | 0 |
| 6 | - | 3 | - | 6 | ø | (Japan) | Ichiyamamoto | M13 | | (Mongolia) | Chiyoshōma | 7 | - | 8 | - | 0 |
| 9 | - | 6 | - | 0 | | (Japan) | **Myōgiryū** | M14 | ø | (Japan) | Tsurugishō | 5 | - | 8 | - | 2 |
| 10 | - | 5 | - | 0 | | (Japan) | **Ōnoshō** | M15 | | (Japan) | **Ōhō** | 8 | - | 7 | - | 0 |
| 8 | - | 7 | - | 0 | | (Japan) | **Yutakayama** | M16 | ø | (Japan) | Daiamami | 2 | - | 9 | - | 4 |
| 10 | - | 5 | - | 0 | | (Japan) | **Nishikifuji** | M17 | | (Japan) | Chiyomaru | 6 | - | 9 | - | 0 |

ø - Indicates a pull-out or absent rank
**winning record in bold**
**Yūshō Winner**

=== September ===
Aki basho

Ryōgoku Kokugikan, Tokyo, 11 September – 25 September

2022 Aki basho results - Makuuchi Division
| W | | L | | A | East | | | Rank | West | | | W | | L | | A |
|---|---|---|---|---|---|---|---|---|---|---|---|---|---|---|---|---|
| 5 | - | 5 | - | 5 | ø | (Mongolia) | Terunofuji | Y | ø | | | 0 | - | 0 | - | 0 |
| 10 | - | 5 | - | 0 | | (Japan) | **Takakeishō** | O | | (Japan) | Shōdai | 4 | - | 11 | - | 0 |
| 0 | - | 0 | - | 0 | ø | | | O | | (Japan) | Mitakeumi | 4 | - | 11 | - | 0 |
| 11 | - | 4 | - | 0 | | (Japan) | **Wakatakakage** | S | | (Mongolia) | **Hōshōryū** | 8 | - | 7 | - | 0 |
| 7 | - | 8 | - | 0 | | (Japan) | Daieishō | S | ø | | | 0 | - | 0 | - | 0 |
| 0 | - | 0 | - | 15 | ø | (Japan) | Abi | K | | (Mongolia) | Ichinojō | 6 | - | 9 | - | 0 |
| 0 | - | 0 | - | 0 | ø | | | K | | (Mongolia) | **Kiribayama** | 9 | - | 6 | - | 0 |
| 10 | - | 5 | - | 0 | | (Japan) | **Tobizaru** | M1 | | (Japan) | Midorifuji | 7 | - | 8 | - | 0 |
| 8 | - | 7 | - | 0 | | (Japan) | **Kotonowaka** | M2 | | (Japan) | **Meisei** | 8 | - | 7 | - | 0 |
| 13 | - | 2 | - | 0 | | (Mongolia) | **Tamawashi** | M3 | | (Japan) | **Ura** | 8 | - | 7 | - | 0 |
| 6 | - | 9 | - | 0 | | (Japan) | Nishikigi | M4 | | (Japan) | **Takayasu** | 11 | - | 4 | - | 0 |
| 5 | - | 10 | - | 0 | | (Japan) | Takarafuji | M5 | | (Japan) | **Sadanoumi** | 9 | - | 6 | - | 0 |
| 10 | - | 5 | - | 0 | | (Japan) | **Wakamotoharu** | M6 | | (Japan) | Endō | 7 | - | 8 | - | 0 |
| 6 | - | 9 | - | 0 | | (Bulgaria) | Aoiyama | M7 | | (Japan) | Ōnoshō | 5 | - | 10 | - | 0 |
| 7 | - | 8 | - | 0 | | (Georgia (country)) | Tochinoshin | M8 | | (Japan) | **Hokutofuji** | 10 | - | 5 | - | 0 |
| 8 | - | 7 | - | 0 | | (Japan) | **Myōgiryū** | M9 | | (Japan) | Kotoekō | 6 | - | 9 | - | 0 |
| 10 | - | 5 | - | 0 | | (Japan) | **Nishikifuji** | M10 | | (Japan) | **Takanoshō** | 8 | - | 7 | - | 0 |
| 7 | - | 8 | - | 0 | | (Japan) | Kotoshōhō | M11 | | (Japan) | Chiyotairyū | 6 | - | 9 | - | 0 |
| 6 | - | 9 | - | 0 | | (Japan) | Okinoumi | M12 | | (Japan) | **Ryūden** | 11 | - | 4 | - | 0 |
| 6 | - | 9 | - | 0 | | (Japan) | Ichiyamamoto | M13 | | (Japan) | Ōhō | 7 | - | 8 | - | 0 |
| 9 | - | 6 | - | 0 | | (Mongolia) | **Chiyoshōma** | M14 | | (Japan) | Yutakayama | 4 | - | 11 | - | 0 |
| 6 | - | 9 | - | 0 | | (Japan) | Terutsuyoshi | M15 | | (Japan) | Tsurugishō | 5 | - | 10 | - | 0 |
| 5 | - | 10 | - | 0 | | (Mongolia) | Mitoryū | M16 | | (Japan) | Hiradoumi | 7 | - | 8 | - | 0 |

ø - Indicates a pull-out or absent rank
**winning record in bold**
**Yūshō Winner**

=== November ===
Kyushu basho

Fukuoka Kokusai Center, Kyushu, 13 November – 27 November

2022 Kyushu basho results - Makuuchi Division
| W | | L | | A | East | | | Rank | West | | | W | | L | | A |
|---|---|---|---|---|---|---|---|---|---|---|---|---|---|---|---|---|
| 0 | - | 0 | - | 15 | ø | (Mongolia) | Terunofuji | Y | ø | | | 0 | - | 0 | - | 0 |
| 12 | - | 3 | - | 0 | | (Japan) | **Takakeishō** | O | | (Japan) | Shōdai | 6 | - | 9 | - | 0 |
| 8 | - | 7 | - | 0 | | (Japan) | **Wakatakakage** | S | | (Mongolia) | **Hōshōryū** | 11 | - | 4 | - | 0 |
| 0 | - | 0 | - | 0 | ø | | | S | | (Japan) | Mitakeumi | 6 | - | 9 | - | 0 |
| 6 | - | 9 | - | 0 | | (Mongolia) | Tamawashi | K | | (Mongolia) | **Kiribayama** | 8 | - | 7 | - | 0 |
| 7 | - | 8 | - | 0 | | (Japan) | Tobizaru | K | | (Japan) | Daieishō | 7 | - | 8 | - | 0 |
| 12 | - | 3 | - | 0 | | (Japan) | **Takayasu** | M1 | | (Japan) | **Kotonowaka** | 9 | - | 6 | - | 0 |
| 9 | - | 6 | - | 0 | | (Japan) | **Meisei** | M2 | | (Mongolia) | Ichinojō | 4 | - | 11 | - | 0 |
| 4 | - | 11 | - | 0 | | (Japan) | Ura | M3 | | (Japan) | **Midorifuji** | 8 | - | 7 | - | 0 |
| 10 | - | 5 | - | 0 | | (Japan) | **Wakamotoharu** | M4 | | (Japan) | **Sadanoumi** | 8 | - | 7 | - | 0 |
| 7 | - | 8 | - | 0 | | (Japan) | Hokutofuji | M5 | | (Japan) | **Nishikifuji** | 9 | - | 6 | - | 0 |
| 8 | - | 7 | - | 0 | | (Japan) | **Nishikigi** | M6 | | (Japan) | **Ryūden** | 9 | - | 6 | - | 0 |
| 6 | - | 9 | - | 0 | | (Japan) | Endō | M7 | | (Japan) | **Myōgiryū** | 8 | - | 7 | - | 0 |
| 3 | - | 12 | - | 0 | | (Japan) | Takarafuji | M8 | | (Georgia (country)) | Tochinoshin | 6 | - | 9 | - | 0 |
| 7 | - | 8 | - | 0 | | (Japan) | Takanoshō | M9 | | (Japan) | **Abi*** | 12 | - | 3 | - | 0 |
| 7 | - | 8 | - | 0 | | (Bulgaria) | Aoiyama | M10 | | (Mongolia) | Chiyoshōma | 7 | - | 8 | - | 0 |
| 9 | - | 6 | - | 0 | | (Japan) | **Ōnoshō** | M11 | | (Japan) | Kotoshōhō | 7 | - | 8 | - | 0 |
| 7 | - | 8 | - | 0 | | (Japan) | Kotoekō | M12 | ø | (Japan) | Chiyotairyū | 2 | - | 6 | - | 0 |
| 8 | - | 7 | - | 0 | | (Japan) | **Okinoumi** | M13 | | (Japan) | **Ōhō** | 10 | - | 5 | - | 0 |
| 7 | - | 8 | - | 0 | | (Japan) | Ichiyamamoto | M14 | | (Mongolia) | Azumaryū | 7 | - | 8 | - | 0 |
| 9 | - | 6 | - | 0 | | (Japan) | **Kagayaki** | M15 | | (Japan) | Atamifuji | 4 | - | 11 | - | 0 |
| 0 | - | 15 | - | 0 | | (Japan) | Terutsuyoshi | M16 | | (Japan) | **Hiradoumi** | 10 | - | 5 | - | 0 |

ø - Indicates a pull-out or absent rank
**winning record in bold**
**Yūshō Winner**
***Won 3-Way Playoff**

==== Playoff ====
(Two consecutive victories required to win the Playoff and the yūshō)

- Match 1: Abi defeated Takayasu
- Match 2: Abi defeated Takakeishō

== News ==
=== January ===
- 4: The Japan Sumo Association (JSA) announces that Tagonoura stable will withdraw from the January 2022 tournament after four individuals at the stable, including the stablemaster (former maegashira Takanotsuru), test positive for COVID-19. The announcement means that makuuchi division competitor and former ōzeki Takayasu will be unable to participate.
- 7: Maegashira Hidenoumi and jūryō Shiden are interviewed by Saitama Prefectural Police as part of an investigation into an illegal gambling establishment in Sōka that was raided in September 2021. Both wrestlers were withdrawn from the January 2022 tournament in December. Media reports later suggest that prosecutors will likely not press charges against either of them.
- 9: Nishikido stable withdraws from the January 2022 tournament due to a COVID-19 case within the stable. A follow-up PCR test confirms that stablemaster Nishikido (former sekiwake Mitoizumi) has contracted the virus.
- 12: Ōzeki Takakeishō withdraws from the January 2022 tournament after spraining his ankle in his Day 3 loss to Ura. It is the eighth time in his career that he has had to pull out of a basho.
- 15: Japanese media outlets report that the Sumo Association's compliance committee, after holding hearings, concluded that Hidenoumi and Shiden participated in illegal gambling. The association's board of directors is expected to take up the issue at their meeting on 27 January. The committee's report recommends a suspension of one tournament for Hidenoumi and no suspension for Shiden, but the board could determine otherwise.
- 21: The Sumo Association announces the retirement of Mongolian former maegashira Kyokushūhō.
- 22: The penultimate day of the January 2022 tournament ends with four wrestlers — yokozuna Terunofuji, sekiwake Mitakeumi and rank-and-filers Abi and Kotonowaka — all in contention for the Emperor's Cup.
- 23: Sekiwake Mitakeumi (13–2) claims his third career yūshō in the top division after defeating yokozuna Terunofuji (11–4) in the final match and also receives his third Ginō-shō special prize for technique. His championship marks the first time since 2015 that the January yusho did not go to a first-time winner. With 33 victories in his last three tournaments, Mitakeumi meets the de facto requirement for promotion to the second-highest rank of ōzeki. Refereeing department chairman Isegahama (the 63rd yokozuna Asahifuji) officially requested that the Sumo Association meet on 26 January to discuss Mitakeumi, making ōzeki promotion all but certain. Meanwhile both of the current ōzeki, Shōdai (6–9) and Takakeishō (1–3–11), will enter the March basho at demotion-threatened kadoban status. Tournament runner-up Abi (12–3), who secured his sixth consecutive winning record since returning from suspension in March 2021 and picked up a kinboshi against Terunofuji on Day 14, is awarded his first Shukun-shō (Outstanding Performance prize). Kotonowaka (11–4), eliminated from Emperor's Cup contention when he was defeated by Abi on Day 15, is awarded his first Kantō-shō (Fighting Spirit prize). Former rank-and-filer Kotoshōhō (11–4) wins the jūryō division championship, eventually resulting in his return to maegashira after one year.

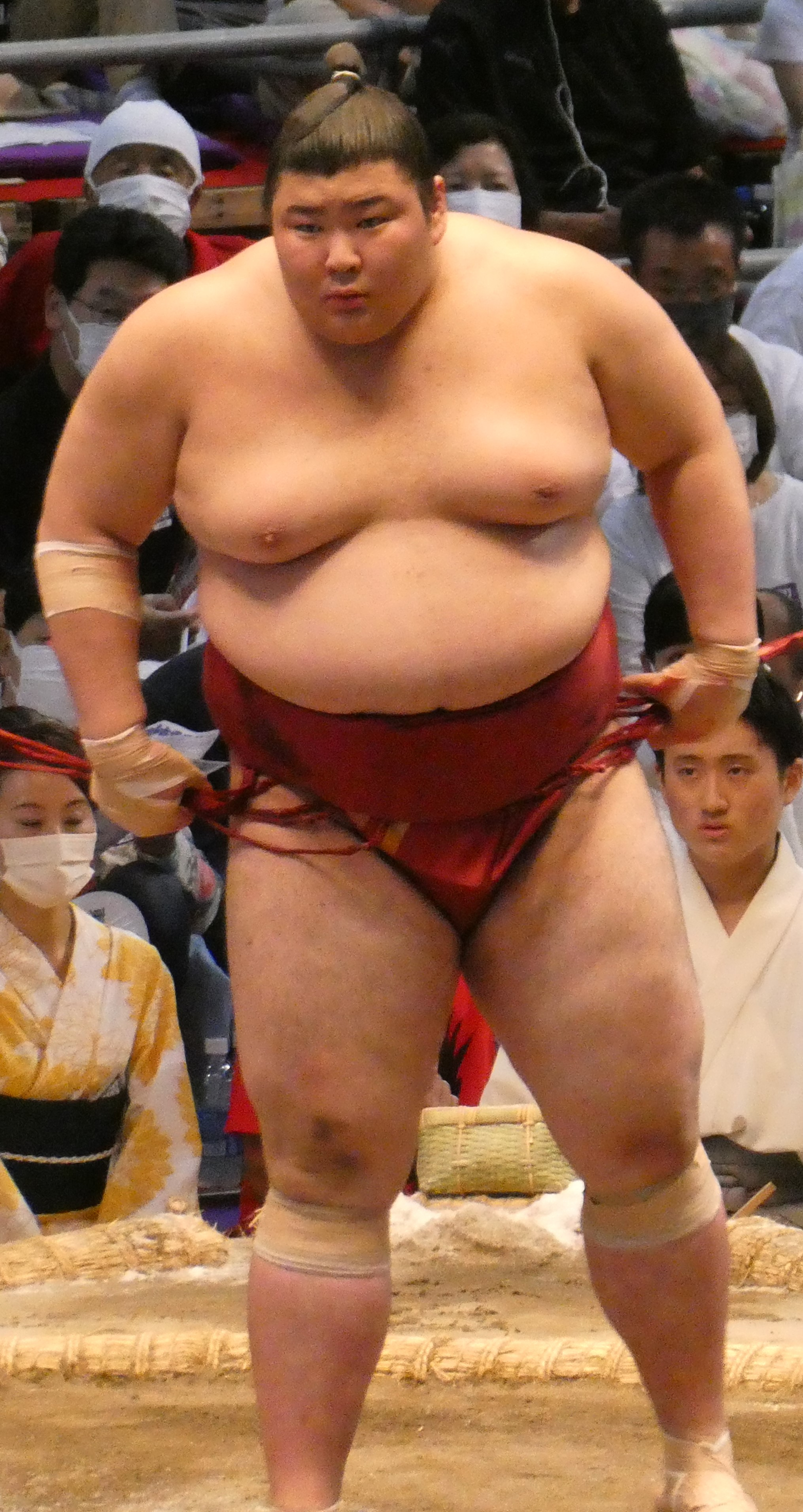
Atamifuji reached jūryō after the January tournament

- 26: Mitakeumi's ōzeki promotion is finalized by the Sumo Association. The 29-year-old is the sixth oldest ōzeki in sumo history, as well as the first ōzeki from Nagano Prefecture in 227 years (since Raiden Tameemon). In his customary acceptance speech, Mitakeumi said he would embrace gratitude, express his own style and devote himself to the way of sumo.
  Four promotions to jūryō are announced. Newly promoted are 19-year-old Atamifuji and 25-year-old Shimazuumi. Atamifuji made his professional debut in November 2020 and won the jonokuchi and jonidan championships in his first two tournaments. He advances to sekitori after just seven basho, all with winning records. Shimazuumi entered sumo in 2012 and had been struggling in the lower divisions with various injuries. He is the first sekitori for the Hanaregoma stable under its new owner, former sekiwake Tamanoshima. Returning to jūryō is Ryūden, who had been suspended for violating COVID-19 protocols before returning to secure the November 2021 makushita championship. He has a combined record of 13-1 in his last two basho. Takakentō also returns to sumo's second-highest division after two tournaments at makushita.
  51-year-old Hanakaze is among the retirements announced by the Sumo Association. Having debuted at the age of 15 in 1986, he is the final sumo wrestler to retire from the Shōwa Era. He competed in a total of 214 tournaments, but never rose above the third-lowest sandanme division.
  The Sumo Association announces that Kakuryū (the 71st yokozuna) and one gyōji have tested positive for COVID-19.
- 27: The Sumo Association's board of directors accepts the committee's report regarding illegal gambling by maegashira Hidenoumi and jūryō Shiden. Hidenoumi is handed a one-tournament suspension retroactive to the January 2022 tournament along with a 20% salary cut for two months. Shiden is not issued any formal suspension, but his kyūjō from the January basho will likely result in his demotion from sekitori status and a loss of salary. Stablemaster Kise (former maegashira Higonoumi) is handed a warning.
  Takekuma (former ōzeki Gōeidō), whose retirement ceremony is scheduled for 29 January, is approved to open a new stable, Takekuma stable.
  Tomozuna (former sekiwake Kyokutenhō) and Ōshima (former sekiwake Kaiki) will swap elder names, resulting in Tomozuna stable being renamed Ōshima stable from 1 February.
  The Sumo Association announces it plans to increase the daily spectator limit for the May 2022 tournament at the Ryōgoku Kokugikan to 9,265—or about 87% capacity—after submitting a COVID-19 infection control and safety plan to the Tokyo Metropolitan Government.
- 30: The retirement ceremony of Kiyomigata (former sekiwake Tochiōzan) takes place at the Kokugikan, the day after the same ceremony was held for Takekuma (former ōzeki Gōeidō).
- 31: Five days after his promotion was finalized, the Sumo Association announces that new ōzeki Mitakeumi has tested positive for COVID-19. Sumo Association spokesman Shibatayama (the 62nd yokozuna Ōnokuni) says that depending on the situation, members who participated in the retirement ceremonies of both Gōeidō and Tochiōzan on 29 and 30 January, respectively, will be tested for the coronavirus since Mitakeumi took part in snipping both of their topknots in the dohyo.

=== February ===
- 2: The Sumo Association announces that six more sekitori from three different stables have tested positive for COVID-19 – Daieishō, Tobizaru, Tsurugishō and Daiamami from Oitekaze stable, Aoiyama from Kasugano stable and Takanoshō from Tokiwayama stable.
- 3: Takayasu and Okinoumi take part in the Setsubun bean-throwing ceremony at the Narita-san Shinshō-ji temple.
- 4: Yokozuna Terunofuji, ōzeki Takakeishō and former ōzeki Tochinoshin are among 17 additional individuals from nine stables announced by the Sumo Association as testing positive for COVID-19. Those also testing positive from the sekitori ranks include Hōshōryū, Ichiyamamoto, Tokushōryū, Wakamotoharu and Wakatakakage. Spokesman Shibatayama says that the retirement ceremony for Nakamura (former sekiwake Yoshikaze) will be held as scheduled on 5 February, but additional sumo events scheduled at the Kokugikan—including the Fuji TV-sponsored Grand Sumo Tournament on 6 February and the NHK charity tournament on 11 February—are eventually cancelled.
- 7: Oguruma stable closes, with Oshiogawa Oyakata (ex-sekiwake Takekaze) taking six Oguruma wrestlers with him and establishing his own Oshiogawa stable. The remaining eight wrestlers are transferring along with the former Yoshikaze to Nishonoseki stable.
- 9: The Sumo Association announces that ōzeki Shōdai is among 48 additional sumo personnel, including nine sekitori and eleven elders, testing positive for COVID-19. Since the start of the January 2022 tournament a total of 252 out of the association's approximately 900 members, including half of all of the wrestlers ranked in the makuuchi division, have tested positive for the virus. Spokesman Shibatayama told reporters that symptoms of sore throat and fever were reported, but there were also quite a few cases that were asymptomatic. He said that the Sumo Association would consult with infectious disease experts as it prepares for the next basho in Osaka.
- 10: Maegashira Ura and jūryō Hiradoumi test positive for COVID-19.
- 14: Due to COVID concerns, the March maezumō for new sumo wrestlers is cancelled for the second year in a row. The new wrestler inspections scheduled for 25 February are also postponed. New wrestlers will be ranked for the May basho in Tokyo after their applications have been submitted and scrutinized by the Sumo Association.
- 19: The retirement ceremony is held for Tateyama (former maegashira Homarefuji) at the Kokugikan.
- 25: The Saitama Prefecture Public Prosecutor's Office announces that it will not prosecute wrestlers Hidenoumi and Shiden, who had been suspected of illegal gambling.
- 26: The Sumo Association announces that three oyakata—Nakamura (former sekiwake Yoshikaze), Nakagawa (former maegashira Asahisato) and Inagawa (former komusubi Futen'ō)—have tested positive for COVID-19. Additional tests will be made on approximately 570 members of the Sumo Association with the March basho in Osaka just two weeks away.
- 28: The banzuke for the March 2022 tournament in Osaka is released by the Sumo Association. Mitakeumi is officially listed for the first time at sumo's second-highest rank of ōzeki, while the two others at the rank—Shōdai and Takakeishō—fight to avoid demotion. Abi, who finished as the top division runner-up twice in a row, finds himself vaulted all the way from maegashira 6 to a new career high at sumo's third-highest rank of sekiwake. It marks Abi's return to san'yaku since being ranked at komusubi for four tournaments in 2019 and 2020. Also making his sekiwake debut is Wakatakakage, who returns to san'yaku after being ranked at komusubi last July. Hōshōryū, the nephew of former yokozuna Asashōryū, makes his san'yaku debut at komusubi. He joins Takanoshō, who was demoted from sekiwake after an eight-loss performance in January. Japanese-Filipino wrestler Kōtokuzan, who had double-digit wins in jūryō in the last two tournaments, is the only new promotion to the makuuchi division. Three wrestlers are promoted again to makuuchi: Kotoshōhō, who returns after five tournaments (and securing the jūryō championship in the last tournament), Nishikigi, returning after nine tournaments, and Kagayaki, who returns after he had just been demoted.

=== March ===
- 12: After stating the previous day that there were no positive tests for COVID-19 among those scheduled to participate in the March 2022 tournament, the Sumo Association announces that Onoe stable will miss the March basho after two lower-ranked wrestlers come down with the virus.
- 18: Yokozuna Terunofuji withdraws on Day 6 of the March basho citing issues with his right heel and left knee, both of which he has injured in the past. The withdrawal comes after suffering defeats to Daieishō and, for the second straight tournament, Tamawashi. It is his first kyūjō since his promotion to sumo's highest rank.

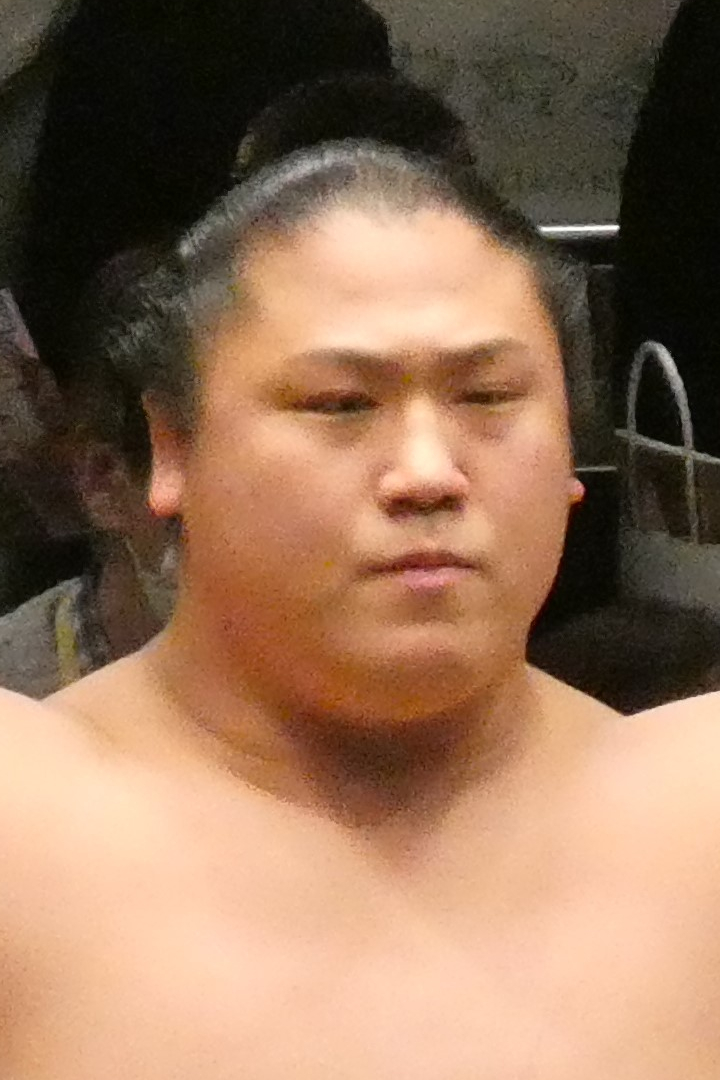
Wakatakakage won his first yūshō in March

- 27: New sekiwake Wakatakakage (12–3) defeats maegashira and former ōzeki Takayasu (12–3) in a playoff to clinch the March 2022 top division championship. Both wrestlers entered the final day in Osaka with 12 wins and the chance to win their first yūshō along with a third competitor, maegashira Kotonowaka, who started the day with 11 wins and could only hope to participate in a two or three-way playoff. First up was Kotonowaka (11–4), who was taken out of the yūshō picture with a loss to new komusubi Hōshōryū (8–7); the nephew of the 68th yokozuna Asashōryū secured his much needed winning record to stay in the san'yaku ranks. Next was Takayasu, who was pushed out by new sekiwake Abi (8–7) in his match. Wakatakakage then had the chance to win the Emperor's Cup outright in the final bout of the tournament but was driven out of the ring by ōzeki Shōdai (9–6) who, like fellow ōzeki Takakeishō (8–7), secured enough wins to be taken out of kadoban status. This set up the playoff match in which Wakatakakage eventually avoided Takayasu's charge and used a pulling overarm throw to secure the victory. In addition to his maiden top division championship, Wakatakakage earns his third ginō-shō (Technique prize). The other two in contention for the Emperor's Cup both receive the kantō-shō (Fighting Spirit prize); it is the tenth overall sanshō prize for Takayasu and the third Fighting Spirit prize for Kotonowaka. The jūryō championship is won by former komusubi Ryūden (13–2), who has now won both a makushita and jūryō division title since he was suspended last year for violating COVID-19 protocols.
- 28: The Japan Sumo Association conducts the biannual elections for its board of directors. Newly elected to the board are Sadogatake (former sekiwake Kotonowaka, whose son presently competes in the top division) and Isenoumi (former maegashira Kitakachidoki). The board then elects Hakkaku (the 61st yokozuna Hokutoumi) to a fourth full term as chairman of the Sumo Association.
- 30: The Sumo Association announces two promotions to the second-highest jūryō division for May. Newly promoted is 29-year-old Tochimaru, an 11-year sumo veteran whose maezumo took place alongside such wrestlers as yokozuna Terunofuji and former sekiwake Meisei. Chiyoarashi returns to jūryō after one tournament at makushita.
  Former jūryō Sakigake is among fifteen wrestler retirements announced by the Sumo Association.
  The refereeing department of the Sumo Association appoints Nishonoseki (the 72nd yokozuna Kisenosato) and Naruto (former ōzeki Kotoōshū) as shimpan (ringside judges).
- 31: At a board meeting in Tokyo, the refereeing department of the Sumo Association decides to reduce the number of total sandanme wrestlers from 100 on either side of the banzuke to 90 (180 total). Spokesperson Shibatayama (the 62nd yokozuna Ōnokuni) explained that the change was made because the number of participants had become unbalanced, suggesting that the number could be lowered further to 80 on each side in the future.
  The Sumo Association also decides to open the July tournament in Nagoya to full capacity (7,448 per day) with same-day ticket sales, and to resume regional sumo tours following the Nagoya basho for the first time since the 2019 winter tour with COVID-19 prevention measures in place.

=== April ===
- 15: Among the new recruits passing the entrance exam for the May 2022 tournament is 24-year-old Hotaka Suyama, the first ever student of the elite University of Tokyo to join professional sumo.
- 25: The banzuke for the May tournament is released by the Sumo Association. There are few changes in san'yaku, with January 2021 makuuchi champion Daieishō returning to komusubi after competing at that rank earlier this year. Former ōzeki Takayasu, who had been in contention for the March championship until losing to sekiwake Wakatakakage in a playoff, is promoted to the top maegashira rank. There are no new promotions from jūryō to makuuchi, but three wrestlers return to the top division: Ōhō returns after just being demoted, Midorifuji returns after five tournaments, and Azumaryū returns after 11 tournaments.
  Former ōzeki Asanoyama is ranked at makushita 42 for his final suspended tournament. He was handed a six-tournament ban in June 2021 for violating COVID-19 protocols and for covering up his violations to investigators.

=== May ===
- 3: Top rank-and-filer and former sekiwake Ichinojō is withdrawn from the May 2022 tournament after testing positive for COVID-19.
- 13: Maegashira Tamawashi defeats Terunofuji in their scheduled match, becoming the first sumo wrestler to earn three consecutive kinboshi against the same yokozuna since Daigō (ex-Wakamisugi) achieved the feat in 1965.
- 22: Four wrestlers entered the final day of the May 2022 tournament with the chance to win the Emperor's Cup, but in the end it was sole yokozuna Terunofuji (12–3) who lifted the trophy for the seventh time in his career. The Mongolian clinched his first yūshō of the year with a win over ōzeki Mitakeumi in the tournament's final match. The co-leader entering the final day, rank-and-filer Takanoshō (11–4), was defeated in his bout by Sadanoumi (11–4); the two, along with komusubi Daieishō (11–4), would have participated in a four-way playoff if Terunofuji had lost. The three ōzeki had poor performances, with Takakeishō (8–7) the only one able to secure a winning record. The other two ōzeki, Mitakeumi (6–9) and Shōdai (5–10), will enter the next tournament in Nagoya at demotion-threatened kadoban status. All three runners-up in the top division are awarded sanshō prizes, with both Daieishō and Takanoshō awarded the Shukun-shō (Outstanding Performance prize) and Sadanoumi awarded the Kantō-shō (Fighting Spirit prize). In the second-highest jūryō division the winner is Terunofuji's stablemate, 25-year-old Nishikifuji (11–4), who secured his fourth championship in sumo with a playoff victory over former maegashira Daiamami.
- 25: The Sumo Association announces three new promotions to the jūryō division. One is Nishikawa, who recently joined the stable run by former ōzeki Gōeidō and will take the new shikona of Gōnoyama (豪ノ山) in the next tournament. The other two new promotions are Ōshōma, who entered sumo in November 2021 as makushita tsukedashi and most recently won the makushita division championship, and 13-year sumo veteran Chiyosakae. Hokuseihō will return to jūryō after competing in just one match at that rank in November 2021, suffering a ligament injury.
  Former jūryō wrestlers Gokushindō and Irodori are among the retirements announced by the Sumo Association.
- 28: The retirement ceremony of Izutsu (former sekiwake Toyonoshima) is held at the Ryōgoku Kokugikan.
- 29: The retirement ceremony of Ajigawa (former sekiwake Aminishiki) is held at the Ryōgoku Kokugikan.

=== June ===
- 5: Nishonoseki (the 72nd yokozuna Kisenosato) opens the new Nishonoseki stable building in Ibaraki Prefecture, where he grew up.
- 8: The Tokyo District Court awards the Japan Sumo Association ¥98 million in damages following a lawsuit involving a former Sumo Association advisor. The court agreed with the Sumo Association's contention that the advisor and his company received money from a slush fund related to a business contract to conduct renovation work on the Ryōgoku Kokugikan.
- 22: Former komusubi Shōhōzan retires after a 16-year career in professional sumo.
- 27: The Sumo Association releases the banzuke for the July tournament in Nagoya. Two wrestlers swap ranks in san'yaku, with Daieishō promoted to sekiwake following his 11-win performance in May, and Abi dropping to komusubi after posting a losing record. Kiribayama and Takanoshō, both of whom posted double-digit wins in May, are elevated to the top maegashira rank. Consequently Ichinojō, who sat out of the May tournament after testing positive for COVID-19, is dropped one position to maegashira 2. Nishikifuji is promoted to the makuuchi division for the first time. The Isegahama stable wrestler, who made his debut in November 2016 winning back-to-back tournaments, joins the top division following his jūryō championship in May. Chiyomaru returns to makuuchi after just being demoted, Tsurugishō returns after two tournaments, and Daiamami returns after five tournaments.
  Former ōzeki Asanoyama is ranked at west sandanme 22 in his return to professional sumo after completing his one-year suspension for violating COVID protocols. He also changes his ring name, switching the first name of Hideki to his real given name of Hiroki.
- 29: The Sumo Association has announced that maegashira and former ōzeki Takayasu has tested positive for COVID-19 along with a junior stablemate. Regular health inspections will be conducted on Tagonoura stable to determine whether or not those wrestlers will be able to participate in the upcoming July tournament.

=== July ===
- 2: The Sumo Association announces that Tagonoura stable, which includes Takayasu, will be withdrawn from the July tournament after another junior wrestler in the stable tests positive for COVID-19.
- 9: Sumo Association Chairman Hakkaku (the 61st yokozuna Hokutoumi) offers his condolences following the assassination of former Prime Minister Shinzo Abe the day before. Hakkaku specifically recalled Abe's attendance on the final day of the May 2019 tournament at the Ryōgoku Kokugikan with then U.S. President Donald Trump.
- 10: The first Sumo tournament in two and a half years without COVID-related spectator limits begins in Nagoya. A moment of silence is held for the late Shinzo Abe prior to the start of top division matches.
- 16: Ōzeki Mitakeumi is forced to withdraw from the remainder of the Nagoya basho after another member of his stable tests positive for COVID-19. Later the same day, it is announced that Mitakeumi himself tests positive for the virus. As it is the first case of a wrestler having to withdraw in the middle of a tournament for COVID reasons, the Sumo Association will have to decide how to rank Mitakeumi — who is also in kadoban status — for the next tournament in September.
- 17: New jūryō wrestler Ōshōma tests positive for COVID-19 in a Nagoya hospital after winning his scheduled Day 8 match. As a result, the Sumo Association announces that all Naruto stable wrestlers will withdraw from the remainder of the Nagoya basho.
- 18: Hanaregoma stable, which includes maegashira wrestler Ichiyamamoto, is the third stable forced to withdraw during the Nagoya basho after stablemaster Hanaregoma (former sekiwake Tamanoshima) tests positive for COVID-19. Including Tagonoura stable, a total of four heya have withdrawn from the tournament under COVID protocols. The Sumo Association also announces that starting on Day 10, spectators would no longer be permitted to eat or drink alcoholic beverages while they are in their seats.
- 19: Musashigawa stable becomes the fifth stable to withdraw from the Nagoya basho due to COVID-19 infections.
- 20: Sadogatake stable and Tamanoi stable pull out of the Nagoya basho due to COVID infections, bringing the total number of stables withdrawn under COVID protocols to seven. In the top division, three rank-and-filers — Kotoekō, Kotonowaka and Kotoshōhō — are all forced to withdraw. In total, about one in five wrestlers have been forced to withdraw from the basho under COVID protocols.
- 21: Asakayama stable becomes the eighth stable to withdraw from the Nagoya basho because of COVID infections. It is also announced that a san'yaku gyōji, Kimura Yodo, has tested positive for COVID-19. However, the wrestlers in his stable (Kokonoe stable) can continue to compete. The total number of wrestlers forced to withdraw this tournament now stands at 134.
- 22: Four additional stables are forced to withdraw due to COVID protocols on Day 13 of the Nagoya tournament: Isenoumi stable, Kataonami stable, Oitekaze stable and Shibatayama stable. Seven top division wrestlers are forced to exit: Daiamami, Daieishō, Endō, Nishikigi, Tamawashi, Tobizaru and Tsurugishō. Tamawashi's withdrawal interrupts his streak of 1,448 consecutive matches since his debut in January 2004, but his streak will officially be kept alive by the Sumo Association. A total of 158 wrestlers from thirteen stables, including 13 sekitori wrestlers, are now out of the tournament under COVID protocols.
  Former ōzeki Asanoyama wins all seven of his scheduled matches and the sandanme division yūshō in his return to professional sumo following a one-year suspension.
- 23: Top-ranked jūryō division wrestler Ryūden defeats maegashira Myōgiryū to secure his second jūryō championship in the last three tournaments. Ryūden, a former komusubi, was suspended for three basho in 2021 for violating COVID protocols. He has won three yūshō in his last five tournaments, including his comeback tournament at makushita in November 2021.
- 24: Mongolian Ichinojō, who was forced to sit out of the last tournament after contracting COVID-19, wins his first Emperor's Cup with a record of 12–3 at the July 2022 tournament in Nagoya. It is Ichinojō's best win record in a basho since March 2019, when he finished with 14 victories as the runner-up to Hakuhō. Yokozuna Terunofuji (11–4) had the chance to force a playoff, but was defeated in the final match of the tournament by ōzeki Takakeishō (11–4), who had been in mathematical contention for the yūshō entering the final day. Ichinojō receives the Shukun-shō (Outstanding Performance Prize), as well as a gold star for defeating Terunofuji earlier in the tournament. The other special prize goes to Nishikifuji, who receives the Kantō-shō (Fighting Spirit prize) after completing his first tournament in the top division with 10 wins – the last of which was earned by default after his final day opponent, Hokutofuji, withdrew following a COVID case at Hakkaku stable. Hakkaku's withdrawal meant that stablemate Okinoumi pulled out of his final match, and also meant that stablemaster Hakkaku (the 61st yokozuna Hokutoumi) could not present the Emperor's Cup trophy to Ichinojō in his capacity as Chairman of the Sumo Association. Instead, the duties were handled by Michinoku (former ōzeki Kirishima).

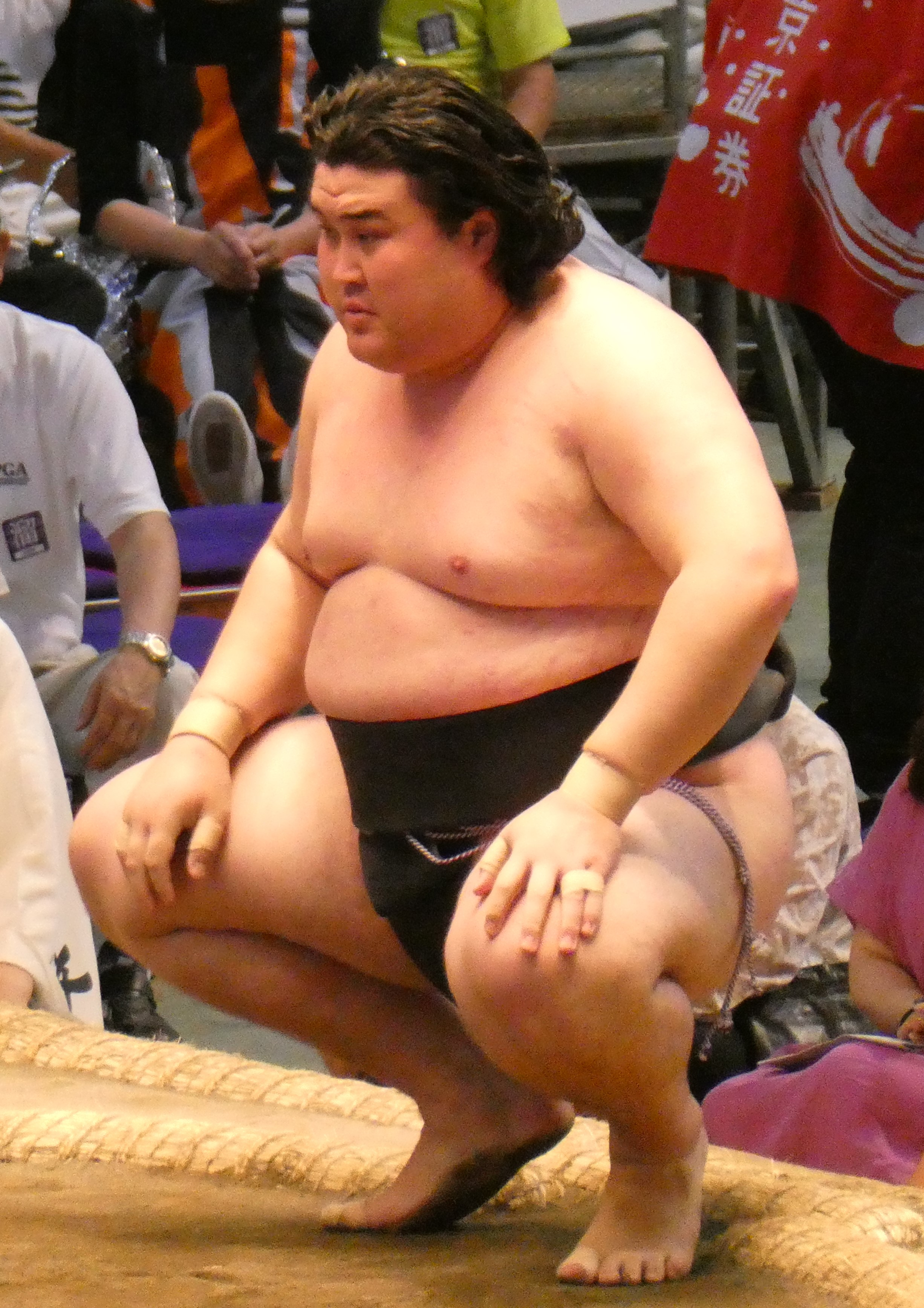
Kinbōzan earned promotion to jūryō after the July tournament

- 27: Three promotions to jūryō are announced by the Sumo Association. Newly promoted for the first time are Kinbōzan, who becomes the first sekitori from Kazakhstan, and Kanno, who will take the new shikona of Tochimusashi in September. Takakentō will return to jūryō after spending the previous tournament in makushita.
  The Sumo Association's refereeing department meets to discuss the rankings for the September 2022 tournament. In particular, the department had to decide the future rankings of the 174 wrestlers who were forced to withdraw from the July basho under COVID protocols. Department chairperson Isegahama (the 63rd yokozuna Asahifuji) later tells reporters that the September banzuke, in principle, will not be disclosed until the scheduled announcement date of 29 August. He states that the department took into consideration various factors, including whether or not the determination of a winning or losing record for each individual wrestler would have been known at the time of their withdrawal.
- 28: The Sumo Association announces that retired yokozuna Hakuhō will assume the Miyagino toshiyori and become the stablemaster of Miyagino stable, which is the stable that he has belonged to for the duration of his sumo career. He assumes the elder name from former maegashira Chikubayama, who will reach the mandatory retirement age of 65 in August.
- 30: The retirement ceremony for former komusubi Gagamaru is held in Tokyo.

=== August ===
- 2: The JSA launches its first official English-language sumo YouTube channel, "Sumo Prime Time," presented by NHK commentator Hiro Morita.
- 7: The retirement ceremony for former maegashira Sagatsukasa is held in Numazu.
- 20: The retirement ceremony for former maegashira Seirō is held in Tokyo.
- 29: The Sumo Association releases the banzuke for the September sumo tournament in Tokyo. The new rankings took into account wrestlers who were forced to withdraw before and during the last tournament in July under COVID protocols. One such wrestler is Mitakeumi, whose status as a kadoban ōzeki is extended to the September tournament. The banzuke also sees three wrestlers each at sekiwake and komusubi for the first time in 23 years. Daieishō keeps his sekiwake rank after his COVID withdrawal in July, joined by Wakatakakage and newly-promoted Hōshōryū, who reaches the best rank of his career. Joining Abi at komusubi are defending makuuchi champion Ichinojō and fellow Mongolian Kiribayama, who both return to san'yaku for the first time since November 2021. Two wrestlers debut in sumo's top division: Hiradoumi, following ten victories in jūryō in the previous tournament, and former All-Japan Sumo Champion Mitoryū. Ryūden returns to makuuchi after he was suspended in May 2021 for violating COVID protocols, as he is promoted to maegashira 12.
  Brazilian former sekiwake Kaisei announces his retirement from professional sumo after sixteen years.
- 31: The Sumo Association reports that following PCR tests conducted in advance of the September tournament, komusubi Abi and Shikoroyama stable coach Tatsutagawa (former komusubi Hōmashō) are among several individuals testing positive for COVID-19. Positive test results were also confirmed for lower ranked wrestlers in Shikoroyama stable, Miyagino stable and Sakaigawa stable. The Sumo Association has not yet determined whether the affected individuals will be able to participate in the upcoming September tournament. Abi would eventually withdraw just before the tournament began due to knee and ankle injuries.

The first jungyō (regional tours) since November 2019 were held at the following locations:

- 5: Tachikawa, Tokyo
- 6: Funabashi, Chiba
- 7: Saitama, Saitama
- 11: Koga, Ibaraki
- 14: Kasukabe, Saitama

=== September ===
- 5: Retired yokozuna Hakuhō (now Miyagino oyakata) announces plans for his retirement ceremony, to be held on 28 January 2023 at the Ryōgoku Kokugikan.
- 9: Following the Japanese government's update to COVID isolation guidelines, the Sumo Association announces a revision to its COVID policy. Association members, including sumo wrestlers, that are designated as close contacts to an individual that tests positive will only need to isolate for three days. Those that do not physically reside in a sumo stable, such as some sekitori and stablemasters, will no longer be considered close contacts and are no longer required to isolate even if another person in the stable tests positive. This replaces the former COVID policy that required a stable to enter one week of isolation if one member tested positive, as well as the withdrawal of the entire stable from a sumo tournament. A total of 23 sekitori were forced to withdraw from the previous basho in July under the former policy. Public relations manager Shibatayama (the 62nd yokozuna Ōnokuni) said that "the most important thing for wrestlers is to be seen by the audience," adding that the Sumo Association wanted to avoid having a future impact on sumo events.
- 16: On the sixth day of the September tournament, yokozuna Terunofuji and the three ōzeki (Mitakeumi, Shōdai and Takakeishō) lose their scheduled matches. It is the first time in 16 years that yokozuna and ōzeki wrestlers have all lost on the same day.
- 19: Mongolian maegashira Tamawashi competes in his 1,457th consecutive sumo match, passing former sekiwake Takatōriki for third on the all-time list. Despite having to withdraw near the end of the July tournament, the Sumo Association has allowed Tamawashi to continue the streak because his withdrawal was due to COVID protocols.
- 20: Yokozuna Terunofuji withdraws from the September tournament on day 10, citing injuries on both of his knees. His stablemaster Isegahama (the 63rd yokozuna Asahifuji) raises the possibility of surgical intervention.
  For the third time in the September tournament, the yokozuna (with his day 10 default counted as a loss) and the ōzeki wrestlers are all defeated on the same day. Tamawashi's win over ōzeki Mitakeumi makes him the first wrestler in 37 years to defeat all yokozuna and ōzeki on the banzuke in the same tournament. The last wrestler to pull off this feat was Kōji (the 60th yokozuna Futahaguro) in 1985.
- 24: Despite losing his Day 14 contest, new jūryō competitor Tochimusashi maintains a two-win gap to claim the championship in sumo's second-highest division. It is the first career yūshō for the 23-year-old native of Iruma. He entered professional sumo in March 2021 as a sandanme tsukedashi, which allowed him to skip the bottom two sumo divisions.
- 25: Tamawashi (13–2) secures his second career top-division yūshō on the final day of the September tournament by defeating the only remaining wrestler in contention, former ōzeki Takayasu (11–4), in his final match. At the age of 37 years and 10 months, Tamawashi is the oldest person to win the Emperor's Cup since the six-tournament system was introduced in 1958. It is also the first time since 1991 that consecutive tournaments have been won by maegashira. Both Tamawashi and Takayasu, who are regular training partners, receive sanshō prizes: Tamawashi receives his second Shukun-shō (Outstanding Performance prize), while Takayasu receives his sixth Kantō-shō (Fighting Spirit prize) and ties former ōzeki Tochinoshin for the most number of sanshō prizes among current competitors. Top maegashira Tobizaru (10–5) also receives the Shukun-shō, while sekiwake Wakatakakage (11–4) collects his fourth Ginō-shō (Technique prize). Ryūden completes his first tournament in maegashira since his 2021 COVID suspension with 11 wins. Takakeishō (10–5) is the only one of the three ōzeki to secure a winning record. Shōdai (4–11) will be in demotion-threatened kadoban status for November, while Mitakeumi (4–11) will be demoted to sekiwake needing ten wins to move back up to the ōzeki rank.
- 28: The Sumo Association announces that Rōga and Tsushimanada will be the two sumo wrestlers promoted to the second-highest jūryō division for the November tournament. Rōga is the first sumo wrestler from Russia to be newly promoted to jūryō since Amūru in 2012, and becomes the first sekitori for Futagoyama stable since its establishment in 2018.
  Former komusubi Jōkōryū is among the retirements officially announced by the Sumo Association. Jōkōryū had announced his retirement at the conclusion of his September tournament matches in the makushita division.

=== October ===
- 1: The retirement ceremony for former ōzeki Kotoshōgiku is held at the Ryōgoku Kokugikan.
- 2: The retirement ceremony for former maegashira Sōkokurai is held at the Ryōgoku Kokugikan.
- 3: Fourth-year Nippon Sport Science University student Daiki Nakamura wins the Sumo Wrestling event at the National Sports Festival of Japan held in Tochigi Prefecture. Having also won the All Japan Sumo Championships in December 2021, he qualifies to start his sumo career–which he is planning to enter upon his graduation–in the third-highest division at makushita 10.
- 5: The retirement ceremony for former komusubi Chiyoōtori is held inside a hall at the Ryōgoku Kokugikan. In an unusual twist made at Chiyoōtori's request, twenty members of the general public who each paid ¥30,000 for a seat to the ceremony are all allowed to take part in the snipping of Chiyoōtori's topknot.
- 7: The two-day Sumo Fan Festival concludes at the Ryōgoku Kokugikan. It is the first time in 17 years that such an event is held, which includes fan interactions with sumo wrestlers and demonstration events. Approximately 9,000 people attend, most of whom were members of the Sumo Association's official fan club. During the festival, two official Guinness World Records are set: Miyagino (the 69th yokozuna Hakuhō) sets the world record of creating 104 tegata hand prints in one minute, and Kabutoyama (former maegashira Ōikari) leads approximately 400 wrestlers and members of the public in shiko leg stomps.
- 18: Yokozuna Terunofuji, who withdrew in the middle of the September tournament, undergoes endoscopic surgery on both knees. Stablemaster Isegahama (the 63rd yokozuna Asahifuji) says that Terunofuji will not return to competition until he has fully healed.
- 31: The Sumo Association releases the rankings ahead of the November sumo tournament in Fukuoka–a tournament that will likely see the withdrawal of yokozuna Terunofuji following his knee surgery. There are a total of seven competitors at the ranks of komusubi (4 wrestlers) and sekiwake (3 wrestlers) for the first time in 30 years. September's top division champion Tamawashi is rewarded with a promotion to komusubi, marking his return to the san'yaku ranks after three years. Joining him is Tobizaru, who reaches san'yaku for the first time in his career. Kiribayama and demoted Daieishō round out the komusubi competitors. Former ōzeki Mitakeumi, who had three consecutive losing records–one of which was not considered for ranking purposes under COVID protocols at the time–is officially demoted to sekiwake. Under the kadoban system, Mitakeumi will need to secure 10 wins at the upcoming tournament in order to have his ōzeki rank restored for January. Current ōzeki Shōdai enters his fifth tournament at kadoban status and will need to secure 8 wins to avoid relegation to sekiwake. 20-year-old Atamifuji is newly promoted to the top division, having had just one losing record in professional sumo since making his debut two years ago. Azumaryū and Kagayaki both return to makuuchi after two tournaments.

Wrestlers in Chiba, October 10

The autumn regional tours were held on the following dates:

- 8: Ōme, Tokyo
- 9: Chikusei, Ibaraki
- 10: Chiba, Chiba
- 15: Kuki, Saitama
- 22: Kōfu, Yamanashi
- 28: Kiryū, Gunma

=== November ===
- 11: As expected, yokozuna Terunofuji officially withdraws from the November tournament in Fukuoka as he continues to recover from endoscopic knee surgery.
- 20: Former komusubi Chiyotairyū retires from professional sumo on Day 8 the November tournament after accumulating five losses at the maegashira rank.
- 25: Kadoban ōzeki Shōdai suffers his eighth defeat on Day 13 of the November tournament in Fukuoka, which will result in his future demotion to sekiwake. With fellow ōzeki Takakeishō already having established a winning record and sekiwake Mitakeumi unable to secure enough wins for promotion back to sumo's second-highest rank, the next tournament in January 2023 will see just one yokozuna (Terunofuji) and one ōzeki on the banzuke for the first time in 125 years.
- 27: In a November tournament that came down to three wrestlers with 12–3 records, maegashira and former sekiwake Abi clinches his first career top-division yūshō over former ōzeki Takayasu and current ōzeki Takakeishō. Takayasu had the opportunity to win the Emperor's Cup outright with a victory over Abi in their scheduled Day 15 contest, but Abi shoved Takayasu down to the dohyo for the victory. Takakeishō then defeated sekiwake Wakatakakage to set up the first three-way playoff in the top division since 1994, in which a wrestler is required to win two matches in a row to claim the yūshō. The playoff only needed two matches, as Abi would go on to defeat Takayasu and Takakeishō in consecutive fashion. Takayasu appeared stunned in his playoff match after slamming his head into Abi's chest during the tachi-ai, and needed assistance to stand up from the ring. Abi, who was suspended in 2020 for violating sumo's COVID-19 protocols and had to work his way back to makuuchi from the third-highest makushita division, said that his first top-division championship seemed like a dream that didn't seem true. Abi was also given one of the three special prizes, receiving his fourth Kantō-shō (Fighting Spirit prize) for his efforts. Takayasu, who fell short of the championship once again with his seventh career runner-up performance in makuuchi, receives his fourth Shukun-shō (Outstanding Performance prize). Mongolian sekiwake Hōshōryū, who had been in contention for the yūshō until late in the tournament, finishes with a record of 11–4 and his second Ginō-shō (Technique prize) as he attempts to make his case for future ōzeki promotion.
  Professional sumo competition in the top division finishes 2022 with six different wrestlers winning each of the six tournaments for the first time in 31 years, as well as rank-and-file maegashira competitors winning three consecutive tournaments for the first time in recorded history. Also for the first time in 31 years, a wrestler in the top division–Terutsuyoshi–goes 0-for-15 in a single tournament, becoming the fifth wrestler since the creation of the 15-day tournament system to suffer such a fate.
  Mongolian Ōshōma clinches the jūryō division championship with a record of 11–4 in just his seventh career sumo tournament, having begun his career as makushita tsukedashi the previous November.
- 28: Former maegashira Yutakayama announces his retirement from sumo.
- 30: The Sumo Association announces that former ōzeki Asanoyama, who was suspended from competing for one year for violating COVID-19 protocols and was relegated on the banzuke accordingly, will return to sekitori as a jūryō competitor in the January 2023 tournament following consecutive 6–1 performances in makushita. Newly promoted to jūryō is 24-year-old Shōnannoumi, who was inspired to enter professional sumo after watching a drama about the 58th yokozuna Chiyonofuji. Hakuyōzan is also promoted, returning to jūryō after four tournaments.

=== December ===
- 1: Ajigawa (former sekiwake Aminishiki) becomes independent from Isegahama stable and forms his own stable.
- 3: The retirement ceremony for former maegashira Asahishō is held at the Ryōgoku Kokugikan.
- 22: The compliance committee of the Japan Sumo Association announces it had interviewed Ichinojō and his stablemaster Minato (former maegashira Minatofuji) concerning allegations published the previous month in the Shūkan Bunshun that Ichinojō assaulted his stablemaster's wife. The Board of Directors of the Sumo Association schedules an extraordinary meeting for 26 December to discuss the matter.
- 26: The Sumo Association releases the banzuke for the January 2023 tournament in Tokyo. For the first time in 125 years there is only one yokozuna (Terunofuji) and one ōzeki (Takakeishō) in the rankings, and for the first time since January 1993 only two wrestlers occupy the first two ranks (on that occasion it was two ōzeki, Akebono and Konishiki). Below Terunofuji and Takakeishō, there are four wrestlers at the rank of sekiwake and four at the rank of komusubi. Former ōzeki Takayasu, the runner-up in the last two basho, returns to sekiwake for the first time since July 2021. Shōdai is demoted to sekiwake, needing ten wins to return to sumo's second-highest rank under the kadoban system. The rank of komusubi includes two wrestlers promoted to san'yaku for the first time in their careers in Kotonowaka and Wakamotoharu (brother of sekiwake Wakatakakage). Meisei returns to the komusubi rank for the first time in one year. November tournament champion Abi moves up a few spots on the rank-and-file ladder to maegashira 3. The banzuke also sees some wrestlers return to the top division: Mitoryū and Tsurugishō both return after one tournament, and Chiyomaru returns after two tournaments.
  As there is just one ōzeki on the banzuke, Terunofuji is designated yokozuna-ōzeki. It is just the second time since 1982 that this designation is used, and the first in nearly three years.
  On the same day that the banzuke is released, the Sumo Association Board of Directors meets to discuss the allegations concerning Ichinojō. While the board partially confirmed the facts and stated that the assault against his stablemaster's wife was not malicious, they did find that Ichinojō violated COVID-related restrictions that had been imposed by the Sumo Association by going out to restaurants on two occasions in November 2020 and August 2021. The board decided to suspend Ichinojō for one tournament (January 2023) after he expressed remorse for his actions and because he had visited the restaurants for just a short period of time. His stablemaster Minato received a 20% salary reduction for three months.
  Isegahama (the 63rd yokozuna Asahifuji) resigns from the Board of Directors after it was confirmed that two junior wrestlers in his stable acted violently against younger wrestlers and that he did not report the incidents to the Sumo Association. One of the two wrestlers held responsible had already submitted his retirement papers, while the other is handed a two-tournament suspension. Isegahama would vacate his role as head of the judging department and later be demoted two ranks in sumo's hierarchy to yakuin taigu iin (executive member).
- 27: Sumo Association spokesman Shibatayama (the 62nd yokozuna Ōnokuni) announces that COVID rules restricting cheering by spectators will be relaxed ahead of the January 2023 tournament in Tokyo. Limits on purchases of alcoholic beverages will also be eased. Spectators will still be asked to wear masks and be silent when eating and drinking in their seats.

The winter regional tours were held on the following dates:

- 3: Nagasaki
- 4: Ashikita, Kumamoto
- 6: Beppu, Ōita
- 7: Kitakyushu, Fukuoka
- 10: Sōja, Okayama
- 12: Hirakata, Osaka
- 13: Nagaokakyō, Kyoto
- 14: Yokkaichi, Mie

== Deaths ==
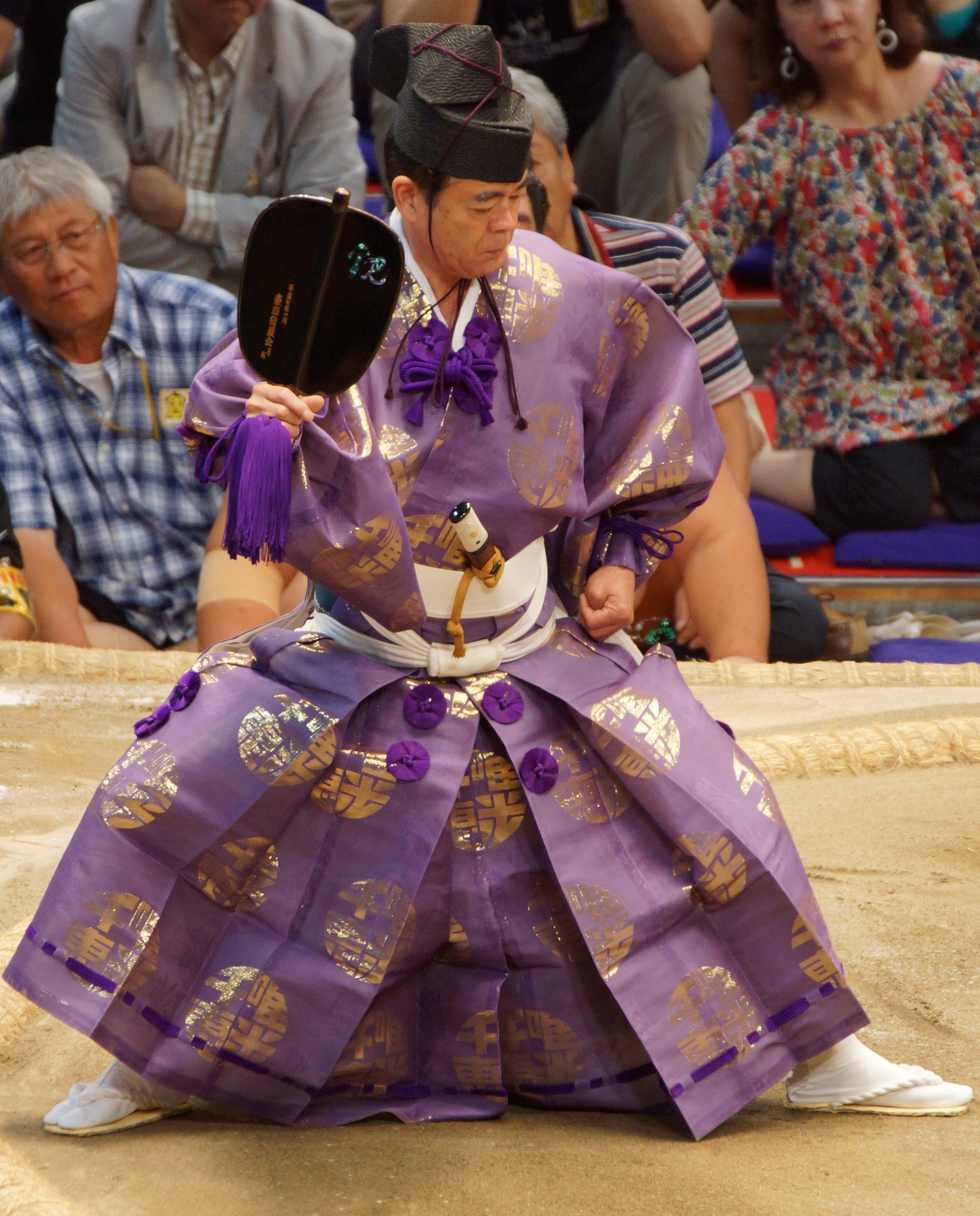
The 36th Kimura Shōnosuke died in November

- 17 February: Former jūryō and youth leader Shiraiwa, aged 64, of an abdominal aortic aneurysm.
- 29 May: Former jonidan and professional wrestler Goto, aged 58, of liver cancer.
- 16 July: The 56th yokozuna Wakanohana Kanji II, aged 69, of lung cancer.
- 22 July: Saburō Hatakeyama, the 37th Kimura Shōnosuke (tate-gyōji), aged 72, of chronic interstitial pneumonia.
- 23 November: Toshihiro Yamazaki, the 36th Kimura Shōnosuke (tate-gyōji), aged 74, of lung cancer.

== See also ==
- Glossary of sumo terms
- List of active sumo wrestlers
- List of years in sumo
