= Terutsuyoshi Shōki =

Japanese sumo wrestler

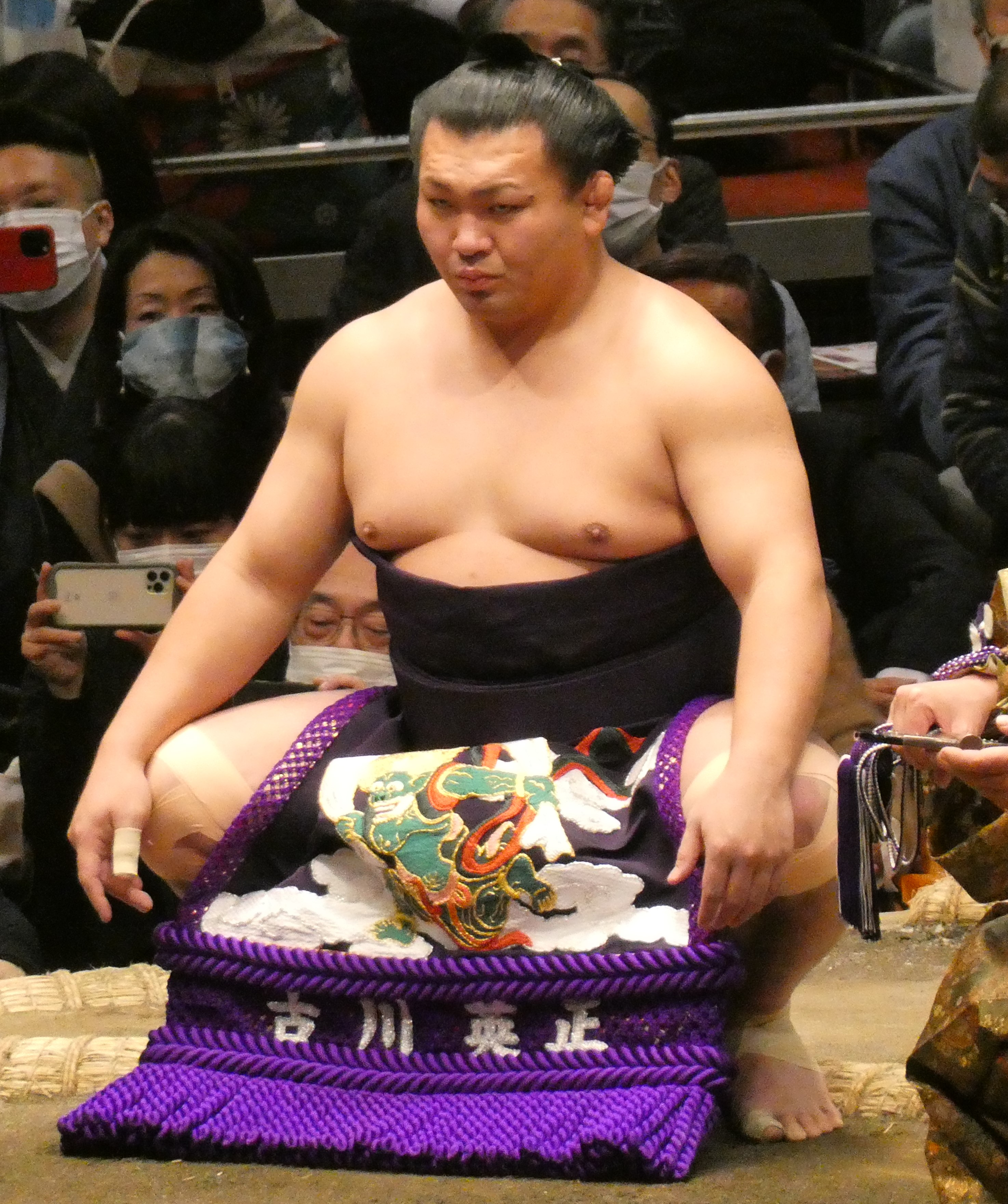
- Terutsuyoshi in 2022

Personal information
- Native name: 照強 翔輝
- Born: Shōki Fukuoka; January 17, 1995 (age 31) Minamiawaji, Hyōgo, Japan
- Height: 1.69 m (5 ft 6 1/2 in)
- Weight: 100 kg (220 lb; 16 st)

Sport
- Sport: Sumo
- Rank: see below
- Retired: March, 2024
- Heya: Isegahama
- Debut: March, 2010
- Highest rank: Maegashira 3 (September 2020)
- Championships: 1 (Makushita)
- Special Prizes: Fighting Spirit (1)
- Updated on 5 April 2024

Terutsuyoshi Shōki (Japanese: 照強 翔輝; born January 17, 1995 as Shōki Fukuoka (福岡 翔輝, Fukuoka Shōki)) is a Japanese former professional sumo wrestler from Hyōgo Prefecture. He made his debut in March 2010, and wrestled for Isegahama stable. He reached the top makuuchi division in March 2019 and won a special prize for Fighting Spirit before retiring in March 2024.

His highest rank has been Maegashira 3. As a professional, he was known for his habit of, during the final salt throw of pre-match rituals, grabbing a huge handful of purifying salt and flinging it high into the air, reminiscent of former sekiwake Mitoizumi.

== Early life and sumo experience ==
Fukuoka was born on the same day and just 15 hours after the Great Hanshin earthquake which hit his local Hyōgo Prefecture. Because of this fact he was often called "earthquake boy" as a child by fellow schoolmates. Having been born on such a day he always felt he needed to do something great and unique with his life. In first grade of elementary school he would take up judo. In his third year of grade school his parents would get a divorce and it was decided that he would retain his father surname of Fukuoka, instead of taking his mother's maiden name of Kikui. Because of the divorce he was often closer to his grandfather, who was an avid sumo fan, and passed this on to Fukuoka. In his fourth year he would attend a local sumo tournament taking second. This would see him join the local sumo club to train. By the time he was in Junior High School he had placed in the best sixteen at the national championship. Fukuoka was not a very good student and had great attendance issues, skipping over thirty days of school one year even though he would still regularly attend his sumo club practices. With his dislike of school and his club coach having a connection to Isegahama-oyakata he would decide to join Isegahama stable right after junior high at fifteen years old.

== Career ==
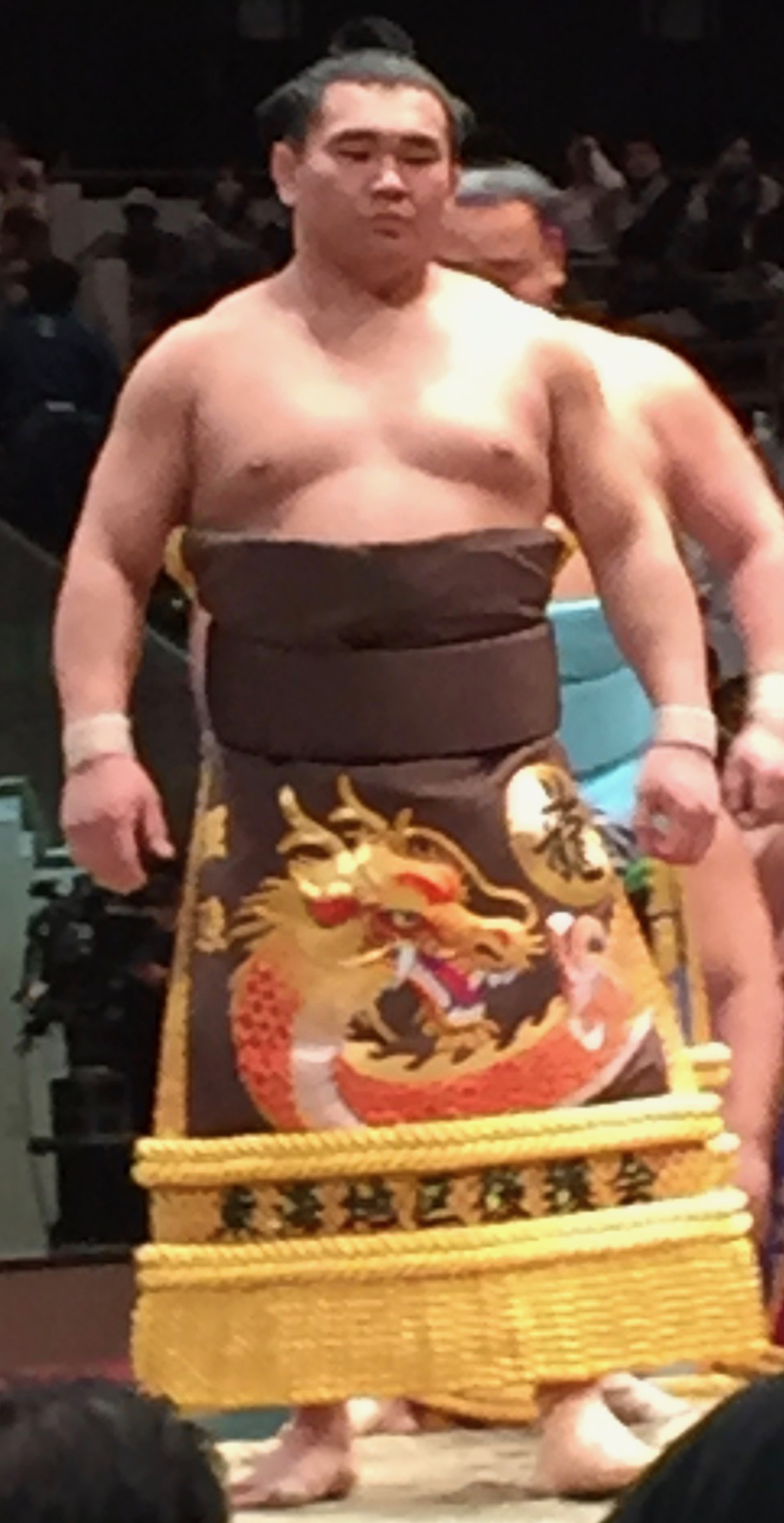
Terutsuyoshi in 2017

He would make his debut in March 2010 along with the likes of Kagayaki and Takanosho. He initially failed his physical exam as he was merely 167 cm tall and weighed 89 kg, but would pass after taking the secondary physical exam. He was given the ring name Terutsuyoshi meaning "a strong light" by his stablemaster, wishing for him to be a bright light of hope to the survivors of the Kobe earthquake. Despite his small size he would make quick work of the two lowest jonokuchi and jonidan divisions. He would hit his first snag in the sandanme division posting his first make-koshi or losing record. He would spend a year here going back and forth with winning and losing records before making his makushita debut in March 2012. He initially struggled and bounced between sandanme and makushita for a year before becoming a third division mainstay. He would remain this way for three years from January 2013 until November 2016, when a 7-0 yūshō or tournament championship at makushita 9 earned him automatic promotion to the jūryō division and sekitori status. Making his jūryō debut in January 2017, he would initially struggle, managing just two winning records after a year in jūryō, before a disastrous 4–11 record at jūryō 9 would send him back down to makushita. In January 2018 at makushita 1 he would score 4-3 and manage immediate repromotion back up to jūryō. His second stint in jūryō was far better than his first. After just one make-koshi, on the back of four straight winning records he would get a 8–7 score at Jūryō 1 gaining him promotion the top makuuchi division.

Like with his other division debuts Terutsuyoshi would struggle, getting two back to back 6-9 records. He was somewhat fortunate to remain in the top division for the July 2019 tournament, but at the bottom maegashira 16 spot in July 2019 he would produce his first top division winning record. He would start out with five straight wins before losing on day six to veteran Sadanoumi. He would then go on another winning streak from day nine to day thirteen. On Day fourteen being a part of the leading group he was given a bout against maegashira 1 Hokutofuji, the only opponent he would face above maegashira 7, which he would lose giving him his third loss. On the final day he would face fellow 11–3 record holder Tomokaze who he would then beat by oshidashi giving him a final record of 12–3. After yokozuna Hakuhō's loss to tournament winner Kakuryū, Terutsuyoshi shared runner-up honours with Hakuhō. He was also awarded the Fighting Spirit prize. Speaking to reporters after his final match he said, "I wasn't really thinking about winning the championship, I just thought I should put everything into my sumo." In his subsequent top division career Terutsuyoshi did not manage to pick up any further awards. In the November 2022 tournament he lost every one of his fifteen matches, which had not been seen in the top division since Itai in July 1991.

Terutsuyoshi said prior to the January 2023 tournament that diabetes had affected his performance. He could only win five out of his fifteen jūryō matches that month, resulting in his demotion out of sekitori status for the March 2023 basho. Due to a series of defeats, Terutsuyoshi was demoted to Makushita 12 for the July 2023 tournament. During this tournament he recorded his first kachi-koshi by beating Dewanoryū in his sixth match. Congratulating himself on his first positive score in eight tournaments, he mentioned that his diabetes had caused him to lose 20 kg (44 lb).

However, Terutsuyoshi's career did not take off any further, and at the March 2024 tournament he decided to retire. At the press conference held the following day to formalize his decision, he announced his intention to hold a haircutting ceremony on 23 June. About 300 people took turns cutting his topknot at the ceremony, with Terutsuyoshi crying after his hair was cut by his seniors Takarafuji and Terunofuji. After the ceremony Terutsuyoshi announced that he would start a new career that would include travel between Tokyo and his hometown on Awaji Island.

== Fighting style ==
Despite his small size, Terutsuyoshi preferred a direct attacking style, moving forward rather than attempting to sidestep or pull down his opponents. Terutsuyoshi's style was unusual in that he preferred a maemitsu grip on his opponent's mawashi, grabbing the front part directly below the stomach area. Terutsuyoshi was also fond of nage (throwing) techniques, and has been known to pull off seldom seen techniques such as nekodamashi. In July 2022, he won by ashitori, or leg grab, on three consecutive days.

Terutsuyoshi recorded 41 different winning techniques in his professional career, with most wins coming by way of oshidashi (push out), yorikiri (force out) or shitatenage (underarm throw).

== Personal life ==
Prior to the January 2023 tournament, Terutsuyoshi revealed that he married a 31-year-old friend of his stablemaster's daughter in August 2022.

== Career record ==
Terutsuyoshi Shoki
Year	January Hatsu basho, Tokyo	March Haru basho, Osaka	May Natsu basho, Tokyo	July Nagoya basho, Nagoya	September Aki basho, Tokyo	November Kyūshū basho, Fukuoka
2010	x	(Maezumo)	West Jonokuchi #14; 5–2	West Jonidan #84; 5–2	East Jonidan #42; 6–1	East Sandanme #77; 5–2
2011	East Sandanme #44; 3–4	West Sandanme #62; Tournament Cancelled; Match fixing investigation 0–0–0	West Sandanme #62; 3–4	East Sandanme #70; 6–1	West Sandanme #13; 3–4	West Sandanme #31; 5–2
2012	East Sandanme #6; 5–2	East Makushita #49; 3–4	East Sandanme #4; 4–3	West Makushita #55; 2–5	West Sandanme #15; 4–3	West Sandanme #5; 4–3
2013	West Makushita #56; 4–3	East Makushita #46; 6–1	West Makushita #19; 3–4	West Makushita #27; 3–4	West Makushita #35; 5–2	East Makushita #19; 5–2
2014	East Makushita #11; 2–5	East Makushita #24; 3–4	East Makushita #32; 5–2	East Makushita #22; 5–2	East Makushita #15; 5–2	East Makushita #9; 2–5
2015	East Makushita #22; 6–1	East Makushita #8; 3–4	West Makushita #14; 4–3	West Makushita #12; 3–4	West Makushita #18; 4–3	East Makushita #13; 4–3
2016	East Makushita #10; 6–1–P	West Makushita #3; 3–4	West Makushita #8; 1–6	East Makushita #32; 4–3	West Makushita #26; 6–1	West Makushita #9; 7–0; Champion
2017	East Jūryō #13; 7–8	East Jūryō #14; 9–6	East Jūryō #11; 7–8	West Jūryō #12; 7–8	East Jūryō #13; 9–6	East Jūryō #9; 4–11
2018	West Makushita #1; 4–3	East Jūryō #12; 7–8	East Jūryō #13; 8–7	West Jūryō #10; 8–7	West Jūryō #8; 9–6	West Jūryō #5; 10–5
2019	East Jūryō #1; 8–7	East Maegashira #14; 6–9	East Maegashira #15; 6–9	West Maegashira #16; 12–3; F	East Maegashira #9; 4–11	East Maegashira #14; 8–7
2020	East Maegashira #14; 8–7	West Maegashira #11; 9–6	East Maegashira #7; Tournament Cancelled; State of Emergency; 0–0–0	East Maegashira #7; 8–7	West Maegashira #3; 5–10	West Maegashira #8; 5–10
2021	West Maegashira #12; 7–8	East Maegashira #13; 8–7	West Maegashira #10; 7–8	West Maegashira #10; 8–7	West Maegashira #7; 5–10	West Maegashira #11; 7–8
2022	West Maegashira #11; 7–8	West Maegashira #11; 8–7	West Maegashira #8; 5–10	East Maegashira #12; 6–9	East Maegashira #15; 6–9	East Maegashira #16; 0–15
2023	West Jūryō #10; 5–10	West Makushita #1; 3–4	West Makushita #5; 2–5	East Makushita #12; 4–3	East Makushita #8; 2–5	East Makushita #17; 2–5
2024	East Makushita #33; 3–4	West Makushita #36; Retired; 0–0–5	x	x	x	x
Record given as wins–losses–absences Top division champion Top division runner-up Retired Lower divisions Non-participation Sanshō key: F=Fighting spirit; O=Outstanding performance; T=Technique Also shown: ★=Kinboshi; P=Playoff(s); Divisions: Makuuchi — Jūryō — Makushita — Sandanme — Jonidan — Jonokuchi Makuuchi ranks: Yokozuna — Ōzeki — Sekiwake — Komusubi — Maegashira

== See also ==
- List of past sumo wrestlers
- List of sumo top division runners-up
- Glossary of sumo terms
