= Ōnokatsu Kazuhiro =

Japanese sumo wrestler

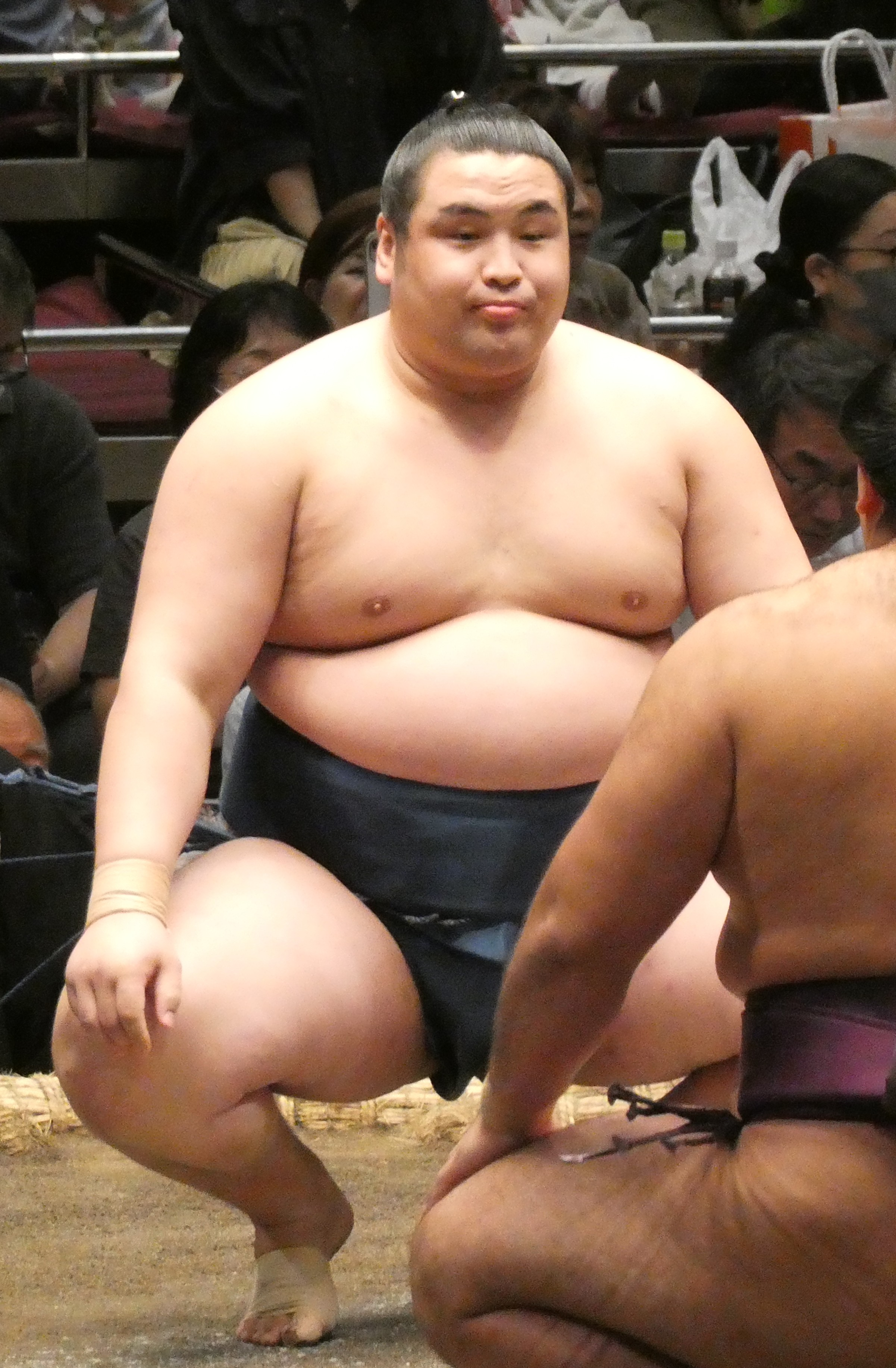

Personal information
- Native name: 阿武剋 一弘
- Born: Batjargal Choijilsüren; 5 May 2000 (age 26) Uvs Province, Mongolia
- Height: 1.85 m (6 ft 1 in)
- Weight: 163 kg (359 lb; 25.7 st)

Sport
- Sport: Sumo
- Rank: see below
- University team: Nippon Sport Science University
- Heya: Ōnomatsu
- Debut: November 2023
- Highest rank: Maegashira 3 (July, 2025)
- Updated on 30 June 2025

Ōnokatsu Kazuhiro (Japanese: 阿武剋 一弘; born 5 May 2000 as Batjargal Choijilsüren (Mongolian: Батжаргал Чойжилсүрэн)) is a professional sumo wrestler from Mongolia. His highest rank is maegashira 3.

== Early life ==
Choijilsüren comes from Uvs Province, a region known as Mongolia's "wrestling capital". At elementary school, he played football. When he was in junior high school, he won a mathematical olympiads in his hometown. He also practiced freestyle wrestling and bökh for only one year before coming to Japan. In November 2015, he took part in an amateur sumo tournament in Ulaanbaatar and was noticed by teachers who came to scout promising talents. They then invited him to come to Japan as part of a school exchange in spring 2016. At the time, he was one of the very first international students welcomed by the school. By his own admission, he wasn't interested in practicing sumo, but on his father's advice he nevertheless decided to go. Choijilsüren attended Niina Gakuen Asahigaoka High School in Odawara, Kanagawa Prefecture, where he was classmate with Ōshima stable's Kyokukaiyū.

Choijilsüren had a prolific amateur career, winning the Kantō openweight championship. He also helped his team to second place in the national high school team competition, a first for a Kanagawa school. At the end of high school, he decided to become a professional and joined the Nippon Sport Science University. There, he was classmates with future-professional wrestlers Ōnosato and Shirokuma, and his team captain was future Asakōryū. At this university, he won the East Japan Rookie Championship during his first year and reached the quarter-finals of the National Tournament in his second year. In his third year he won the Open Weight Student Weight Class Championship. In 2022, during his last competition, Choijilsüren won the hundredth edition of the National University Championship, defeating fellow Nittaidai student Daiki Nakamura. Choijilsüren hence became a student yokozuna and was guaranteed the rank of makushita tsukedashi 15 in his professional debut. Noticed by Ōnomatsu stable, he was training in that stable since December 2022. Since he turned professional in November 2023, Ōnokatsu was the last wrestler to be promoted to makushita tsukedashi 15 due to his amateur prowess, the system for promotion to the top of the makushita division having been abolished in September 2023.

During his student days, he remembered the COVID-19 pandemic, forcing him to remain isolated in his dormitory for half a year, all training having also been cancelled by his school.

== Career ==
=== Early career ===
Logically recruited by Ōnomatsu stable, he was given the shikona, or ring name, Ōnokatsu (阿武剋); inheriting the combination of "Ōno" (阿武) in reference to his stable, combined with the kanji meaning 'to endure' or 'to overcome' (剋), inspired by the adage gekokujō. His first name is also a pseudonym, inspired by the kanji in the names of his two masters at high school and Nittaidai University.

Ōnokatsu began his professional career at the November 2023 tournament, becoming the last wrestler to be able to match the record promotion to sekitori status in one tournament of Hakuōhō (then known as Ochiai) achieved at the January 2023 tournament. However, he finished his first tournament with a score of 5–2, also losing his first match, missing the promotion.

At the March 2024 tournament, he secured his promotion to the jūryō division, notably scoring a fourth victory over future-sekitori Nabatame. During his first tournament as a sekitori, Ōnokatsu narrowly failed to win his division's championship, ending just behind former sekiwake Wakatakakage. His score of 13–2, however, propelled him to the top of the jūryō rankings. His remarkable performance attracted comments about the possible emergence of a golden generation with the good performances of generation Z wrestlers (like Ōnosato or Hiradoumi).

=== Makuuchi promotion ===
After a good performance in the July 2024 tournament, Ōnokatsu was promoted to makuuchi, professional sumo's top division. After promotion to the highest professional division, Ōnokatsu stagnated for a while, failing to win more than ten victories in his first three makuuchi tournaments.

At the January 2026 tournament, Ōnokatsu became the fourth wrestler in sumo history to win two consecutive matches by default, due to the injury withdrawal of his scheduled opponents. Ōnokatsu withdrew on the second day of the March 2026 tournament after landing awkwardly on his left knee in his day one match against Ichiyamamoto. It was later revealed that he had sprained his left ankle during the fall. This marked the first absence of his career. He returned to competition on Day 5, losing to unbeaten Takanoshō. He withdrew once again on Day 9 after only winning one of his matches, once again due to the left ankle sprain.

== Fighting style ==
Ōnokatsu specializes in grabbing the front of his opponent's mawashi (maemitsu). The wrestler from whom he draws inspiration for his style is former yokozuna Kakuryū.

== Personal life ==
Ōnokatsu's favorite dish is curry, a preference he developed during his high school years as curry dishes were common after training. He cites the town of Odawara as a second hometown, being particularly grateful for the support of the locals. The city also offered him his first keshō-mawashi when he was promoted in jūryō, the appron bearing a design of the Odawara Castle. His Japanese has been described by the press as very academic. His favorite song is Jidai Okure by Eigo Kawashima.

== Career record ==
Ōnokatsu Kazuhiro
Year	January Hatsu basho, Tokyo	March Haru basho, Osaka	May Natsu basho, Tokyo	July Nagoya basho, Nagoya	September Aki basho, Tokyo	November Kyūshū basho, Fukuoka
2023	x	x	x	x	x	Makushita tsukedashi #15; 5–2
2024	East Makushita #8; 6–1	West Makushita #2; 5–2	East Jūryō #12; 13–2	West Jūryō #1; 9–6	West Maegashira #14; 7–8	East Maegashira #15; 9–6
2025	West Maegashira #12; 7–8	West Maegashira #12; 10–5	East Maegashira #8; 10–5	East Maegashira #3; 6–9	East Maegashira #6; 7–8	West Maegashira #6; 7–8
2026	West Maegashira #6; 7–8	West Maegashira #6; 1–6–8	East Jūryō #1; 9–6	East Maegashira #15; 4–11	West Jūryō #3; 8–7	West Jūryō #1; 6–9
Record given as wins–losses–absences Top division champion Top division runner-up Retired Non-participation Jūryō Lower divisions Sanshō key: F=Fighting spirit; O=Outstanding performance; T=Technique Also shown: ★=Kinboshi; P=Playoff(s); Divisions: Makuuchi — Jūryō — Makushita — Sandanme — Jonidan — Jonokuchi Makuuchi ranks: Yokozuna — Ōzeki — Sekiwake — Komusubi — Maegashira

== See also ==
- Glossary of sumo terms
- List of active sumo wrestlers
- List of Mongolian sumo wrestlers
- List of non-Japanese sumo wrestlers
