= Shōnannoumi Momotarō =

Japanese sumo wrestler

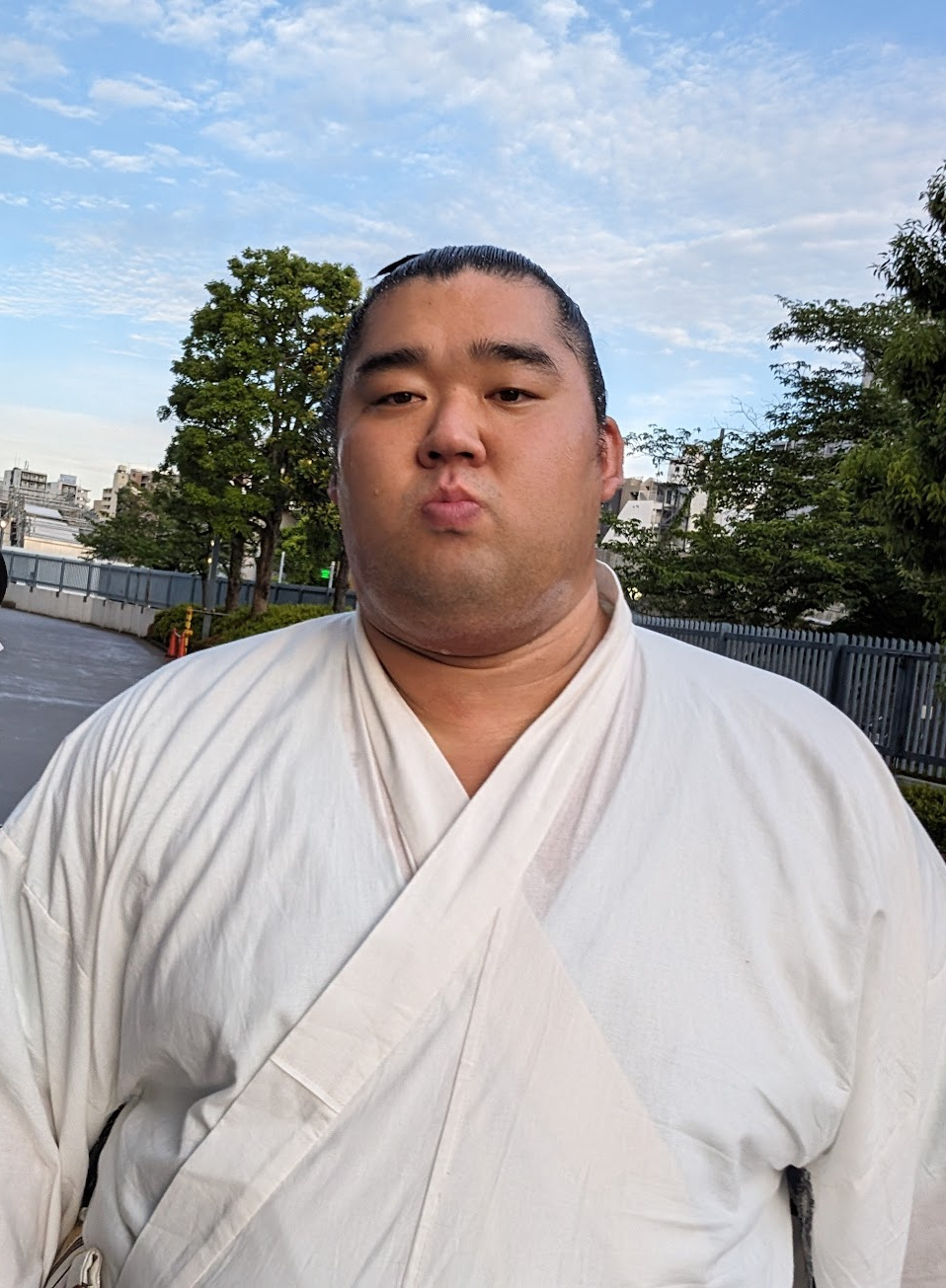
- Shōnannoumi in 2024

Personal information
- Native name: 湘南乃海 桃太郎
- Born: Shoto Tanimatsu; April 8, 1998 (age 28) Ōiso, Kanagawa Prefecture; Japan
- Height: 1.94 m (6 ft 4 1/2 in)
- Weight: 183 kg (403 lb; 28.8 st)

Sport
- Sport: Sumo
- Rank: see below
- Heya: Takadagawa
- Debut: March 2014
- Highest rank: Maegashira 5 (September 2023)
- Championships: Jūryō (1)
- Special Prizes: Fighting Spirit (1)
- Updated on July 26, 2026

Shōnannoumi Momotarō (Japanese: 湘南乃海 桃太郎; born April 8, 1998) is a Japanese professional sumo wrestler from Ōiso, Kanagawa Prefecture. Wrestling for Takadagawa stable, he made his professional debut in March 2014, and became sekitori when he reached the jūryō division in January 2023. He was promoted to sumo's top division in July 2023. His highest rank has been maegashira 5.

== Early life and sumo background ==
Shōnannoumi has no background in sumo, but rather in baseball, a sport he played at Ōiso Elementary School and on the baseball team at Ōiso Junior High School. His family is also linked with the sports, his father being a local baseball coach. He first had a negative impression of sumo wrestlers but changed his mind after seeing Yokozuna Chiyonofuji. His motivation to join sumo came from visiting Takadagawa stable when he was in junior high school in Ōiso, Kanagawa. In his third year of junior high school, he began to receive invitations from strong high school baseball teams, but decided to become a professional sumo wrestler (rikishi). He began an intense training with his father to make up for lost practice. Upon joining the world of professional sumo he vowed not to return to his hometown until he had reached the rank of sekitori.

== Career ==
=== Early career ===
Shōnannoumi made his professional debut in March 2014, alongside future ōzeki Shōdai. He was given the shikona, or ring name, "Shōnannoumi" meaning "The Sea of Shōnan", which is the region in Kanagawa prefecture where Ōiso is located. His shikona first name, Momotarō, was given to him to encourage him to defeat strong opponents, just like the character from the myth. He decided to join Takadagawa stable despite being invited by seven other stables because his master told him that the "disappointing Japanese wrestlers" would allow him to become a "hero". Shōnannoumi first served as tsukebito (assistant) to his fellow stablemate Ryūden. He would steadily rise through the lower 3 divisions and he was promoted to the makushita division in November 2016. Because of his physique, his stable had high hopes for him although Shōnannoumi suffered from the wall of the upper makushita ranks for a long time. In the July 2020 tournament, he was put up against former maegashira Ura, who was making his comeback to the top division after an injury caused him to miss 4 consecutive tournaments. Shōnannoumi ended Ura's 18-bout win streak and was Ura's only loss in this tournament. On 19 January 2021, Shōnannoumi suffered a concussion in a makushita bout against Takasago wrestler Asagyokusei. Both wrestlers bumped into each other at the tachi-ai, forcing the match to be stopped as Shōnannoumi was unable to get up and had symptoms of a concussion. After deliberating whether or not to allow him to continue, the shimpan decided on a rematch, respecting the will of Shōnannoumi to continue. Shōnannoumi won the bout but the Japan Sumo Association faced an online backlash because Shōnannoumi was obviously dazed. The Sumo Association established in the same month a new rule preventing wrestlers from competing if they have a concussion or any other physical abnormality, regardless of the wrestler's intentions.

=== Sekitori career ===
In 2022, Shōnannoumi was finally promoted sekitori after nine years in professional sumo. During the party celebrating his promotion, former Japanese Prime Minister Yoshirō Mori, a patron of his stable, declared 'I knew this man would become someone. A fine sekitori has emerged from Kanagawa Prefecture'. He initially chose a dark pink shimekomi for his first tournament because it's the colour of the Saikijin Clinic in Hiroshima who offered him the mawashi, and because he considers that color is his lucky charm. In his first tournament in jūryō, Shōnannoumi finished with a strong 12–3 record. During the May 2023 tournament, Shōnannoumi started the competition at its highest rank and finished with a score of 11–4. Looking back on his first tournaments as a sekitori, he commented that the public's expectations pushed him to do better and better in order to live up to the acclaim.

After only three tournaments in jūryō, Shōnannoumi was officially promoted to the top makuuchi division in July 2023 with the rank of west maegashira 14. He became the eleventh wrestler from his prefecture to reach this rank since Kōtokuzan in 2022, who, although born in the Philippines, was listed as coming from Yokohama (Kanagawa Prefecture), where his father originated from. He told reporters upon his promotion that he wanted to win ten matches and win a special prize at the upcoming tournament, adding that he wanted to make sure that in the weeks leading up to the July tournament he would be ready with confidence on Day 1.

On Day 12 of the July 2023 tournament Shōnannoumi scored an upset victory over one of the tournament leaders, maegashira Nishikigi, thereby achieving a winning record. Having scored a ninth victory, Shōnannoumi was in line for one of the sanshō prizes, but the award was conditional on a tenth victory. On the final day of the tournament, he defeated Myōgiryū and won the Fighting Spirit prize.

Shōnannoumi was a contender for the top-division championship during the May 2024 tournament, taking the sole lead on Day 11 at the rank of maegashira 10 with only 2 losses before falling out of the title race.

During the July 2026 tournament, Shōnannoumi established himself as one of the top contenders in the jūryō division, racking up six consecutive wins starting on the ninth day of the tournament. On the final day, he lost his bout to Tokihayate, setting the stage for a four-way playoff for the championship. Shōnannoumi won both of his bouts in a row and claimed the jūryō championship for the first time.

== Personal life ==
Shōnannoumi's favourite pastime is listening to music. He is a particular fan of the band Shōnan no Kaze, which hails from his home town.

== Career record ==
Shōnannoumi Momotarō
Year	January Hatsu basho, Tokyo	March Haru basho, Osaka	May Natsu basho, Tokyo	July Nagoya basho, Nagoya	September Aki basho, Tokyo	November Kyūshū basho, Fukuoka
2014	x	(Maezumō)	West Jonokuchi #15; 4–3	West Jonidan #73; 6–1	East Jonidan #3; 4–3	East Sandanme #83; 2–5
2015	West Jonidan #12; 5–2	West Sandanme #77; 2–5	East Jonidan #10; 3–4	East Jonidan #29; 5–2	West Sandanme #93; 3–4	East Jonidan #11; 5–2
2016	West Sandanme #75; 4–3	East Sandanme #57; 5–2	East Sandanme #29; 4–3	East Sandanme #18; 4–3	West Sandanme #8; 4–3	East Makushita #59; 4–3
2017	West Makushita #48; 4–3	East Makushita #40; 3–4	East Makushita #48; 1–6	East Sandanme #23; 6–1	West Makushita #44; 6–1	West Makushita #18; 5–2
2018	East Makushita #9; 3–4	West Makushita #13; 4–3	West Makushita #11; 3–4	West Makushita #15; 1–6	East Makushita #37; 4–3	East Makushita #33; 4–3
2019	West Makushita #28; 6–1	West Makushita #8; 4–3	West Makushita #5; 1–6	West Makushita #19; 4–3	East Makushita #17; 5–2	East Makushita #9; 3–4
2020	East Makushita #13; 3–4	West Makushita #20; 3–4	East Makushita #26; Tournament Cancelled; State of Emergency; 0–0–0	East Makushita #26; 4–3	West Makushita #17; 4–3	East Makushita #14; 3–4
2021	East Makushita #22; 5–2	East Makushita #14; 3–4	West Makushita #19; 4–3	East Makushita #14; 4–3	East Makushita #9; 4–3	East Makushita #5; 2–5
2022	West Makushita #17; 4–3	East Makushita #14; 5–2	West Makushita #9; 3–4	East Makushita #15; 6–1	West Makushita #5; 5–2	West Makushita #1; 5–2
2023	East Jūryō #13; 12–3	West Jūryō #3; 9–6	West Jūryō #1; 11–4	West Maegashira #14; 10–5; F	West Maegashira #5; 7–8	East Maegashira #6; 7–8
2024	West Maegashira #6; 4–11	East Maegashira #12; 9–6	East Maegashira #10; 9–6	West Maegashira #5; 7–8	West Maegashira #5; 3–12	West Maegashira #13; 8–7
2025	East Maegashira #13; 8–7	West Maegashira #10; 4–11	West Maegashira #15; 5–10	East Jūryō #2; 10–5	West Maegashira #15; 7–8	West Maegashira #15; 3–12
2026	West Jūryō #4; 5–10	East Jūryō #8; 8–7	East Jūryō #8; 9–6	East Jūryō #6; 11–4–PP; Champion	East Maegashira #17; 3–12	East Jūryō #6; 6–9
Record given as wins–losses–absences Top division champion Top division runner-up Retired Non-participation Jūryō Lower divisions Sanshō key: F=Fighting spirit; O=Outstanding performance; T=Technique Also shown: ★=Kinboshi; P=Playoff(s); Divisions: Makuuchi — Jūryō — Makushita — Sandanme — Jonidan — Jonokuchi Makuuchi ranks: Yokozuna — Ōzeki — Sekiwake — Komusubi — Maegashira

== See also ==
- Glossary of sumo terms
- List of active sumo wrestlers
- List of active special prize winners
- List of sumo second division champions
