= Chiyoshōma Fujio =

Mongolian sumo wrestler

Chiyoshōma Fujio 千代翔馬 富士雄
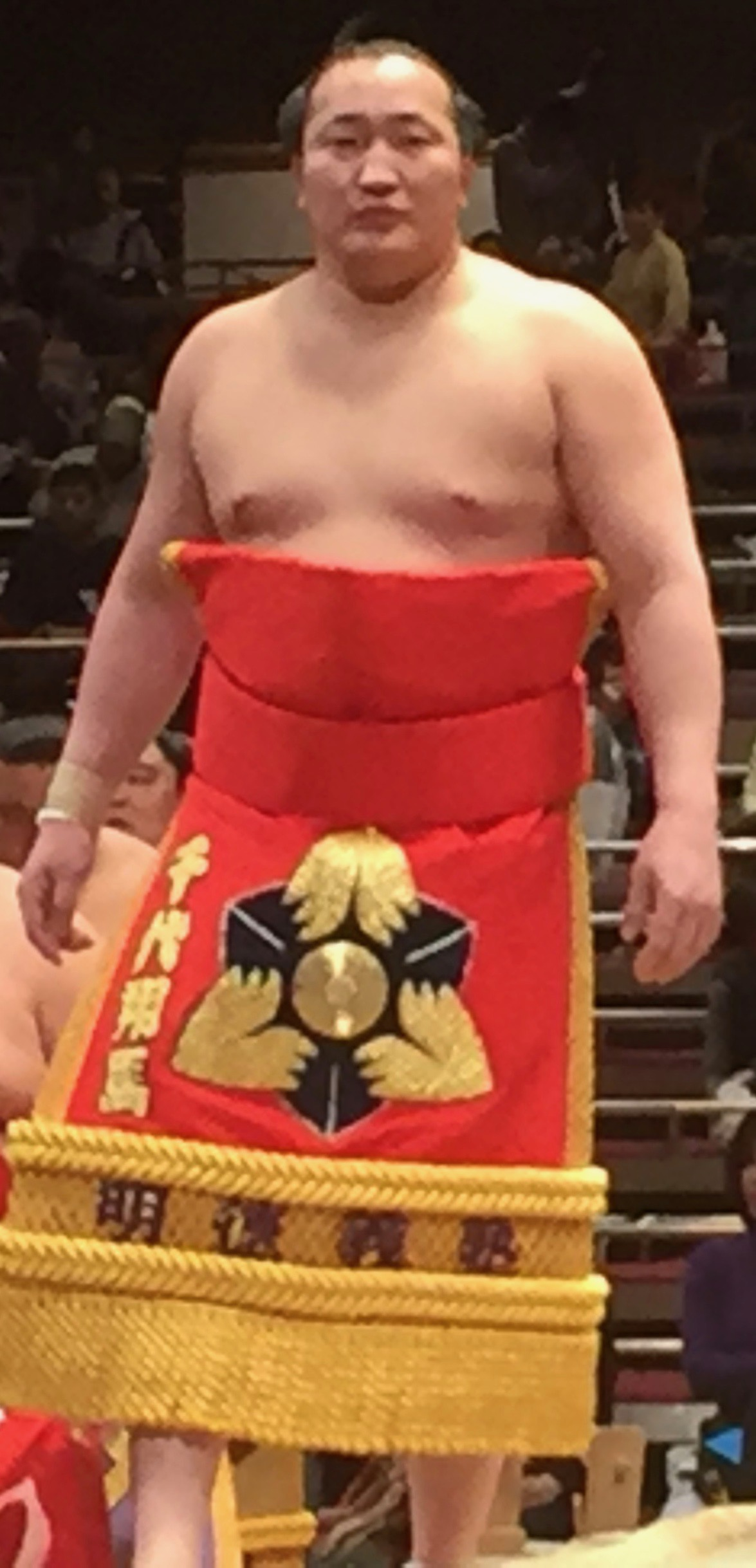
- Chiyoshōma in 2016

Personal information
- Born: Ganbaatar Munkhsaihan; July 20, 1991 (age 35) Ulaanbaatar, Mongolian People's Republic
- Height: 1.84 m (6 ft 1/2 in)
- Weight: 140 kg (310 lb; 22 st)

Sport
- Sport: Sumo
- Rank: see below
- Heya: Kokonoe
- Debut: July, 2009
- Highest rank: Maegashira 2 (May 2017)
- Championships: 1 (Makushita)
- Gold Stars: 1; Hōshōryū
- Updated on 13 March 2025

Chiyoshōma Fujio (Japanese: 千代翔馬 富士雄; born 20 July 1991 as Ganbaatar Munkhsaihan (Mongolian: Ганбаатарын Мөнхсайхан)) is a professional sumo wrestler from Ulaanbaatar, Mongolia. He made his debut in July 2009 and reached the top makuuchi division in September 2016. He wrestles for Kokonoe stable. His highest rank is maegashira 2.

== Early life and sumo experience ==
As a child, Munkhsaihan's father was the equivalent of ōzeki in Mongolian wrestling. He was at his father's side most everywhere he went, and his father would often take him to judo and wrestling practice. In addition his father and Asashōryū's father were acquaintances. These circumstances naturally led to an interest in the sumo world. He met former yokozuna Chiyonofuji when the elder came to Munkhsaihan's region on a sumo tour and through Chiyonofuji's invitation, he transferred to Meitoku Gijuku High School, a school well-known for its sumo program. He left the school in his second year and joined Chiyonofuji's Kokonoe stable.

== Career ==
He joined at the same time as Aoiyama and the two attended sumo school at the same time and also graduated together. He weighed only a light 87 kilograms when he first stepped into the ring, and there was concern whether or not he could make it on the dohyō. However, thinking of his father, a popular figure of high rank in Mongolian sumo, made him ashamed at the prospect of quitting early and he resolved to stick it out. From his entry into sumo until he reached the sandanme division, he took the shikona Shōma Fujio (翔馬 富士男). Upon reaching sandanme in July 2010, as is the custom at his stable, he took the 'Chiyo' part of legendary wrestlers from the stable such as Chiyonofuji and Chiyonoyama, and became Chiyoshōma Fujio. After a little more than a year, in September 2011, he received promotion to the 3rd division known as makushita. Though he bounced back and forth between sandanme and makushita for a period after this, from November 2012 he was re-promoted to makushita with good enough results to become a makushita regular. Up until this point he had to serve stablemates Chiyomaru and Chiyo'ō who were the same age as him, so this was incentive for him to train hard and work his way up the ranks. For the next three years he would soldier on in the third division, moving slowly upward. In September 2015 he won the makushita yūshō by winning out in an eight-way playoff, defeating Takakeishō as his final opponent. This put him at makushita 3 for the next tournament where he achieved another 6–1, guaranteeing his promotion to the salaried ranks of jūryō. At the press conference for his promotion, he stated that six and a half years had been a long time, and he had hoped to reach the professional ranks in four years. He also said that he still had further to rise and he would do his best. A party to celebrate his promotion was held at a hotel in Tokyo at which his parents brought traditional Mongolian outfits for Chiyonofuji and his wife to try out.

In his first two tournaments in jūryō starting in January 2016, he attained two winning tournaments. In the following May tournament he only managed a 7–8, but bounced back to a 9–6 record for the July tournament at jūryō 3, earning him promotion to the top flight makuuchi division. He made his top division debut in the Aki basho of September 2016, the first new makuuchi wrestler from Kokonoe stable since the death of his stablemaster Chiyonofuji on July 31 of that year. Following his entry into makuuchi Chiyoshōma had two consecutive winning tournaments and he is working his way towards the possibility of being a regular makuuchi wrestler. His first tournament fighting all the ōzeki and yokozuna was in May 2017 from the rank of maegashira 2 where he fell short with a 5–10 record.

He was reprimanded during the November 2017 tournament for causing three matta or false starts in his Day 9 match against Hokutofuji by not putting both fists to the ground, and for thrusting at Hokutofuji after the first matta was called.

His string of 498 consecutive matches from sumo entry was broken on the final day of the July 2018 tournament when he pulled out due to an injury. He lost top division status after the May 2019 tournament, but returned to makuuchi in November 2020 after eight tournaments in jūryō.

On the day before the scheduled start of the January 2021 tournament, it was announced that Chiyoshōma had tested positive for COVID-19. He, and all of the other members of Kokonoe stable, subsequently withdrew from that tournament.

Chiyoshōma was demoted to jūryō for the November 2023 tournament. In December 2023 he underwent surgery for his lower back. He returned to the top division for the July 2024 tournament, but he withdrew before the opening day matches were determined. It was later reported that he had surgery to repair a herniated disc at the end of June. It marked his first absence from the ring in his 15-year professional sumo career, excluding cancelled tournaments and COVID-related withdrawals. He told reporters after winning his return match on Day 6 that he got carried away with strength training after his surgery in December, which caused his back pain to return.

During the first half of the 2025 January tournament, Chiyoshōma established himself as one of the competition's leading wrestlers. On Day 10, he maintained himself among the trio of wrestlers still in positions to challenge Kinbōzan (sole leading wrestler) for the title (with Ōhō and Takerufuji). Chiyoshōma nevertheless accumulated defeats, notably at the hands of ōzeki Hōshōryū and Ōnosato, taking him out of the title race.

On Day 5 of the 2025 March tournament, Chiyoshōma won his first career kinboshi by defeating yokozuna Hōshōryū, employing an initial sidestep (henka) to give himself an early advantage in the bout.

== Fighting style ==
Chiyoshōma's preferred grip on his opponent's mawashi or belt is hidari-yotsu, a right hand outside, left hand inside position. He uses both pushing and grappling techniques. His most common winning kimarite are hatakikomi (slap down), yorikiri (force out) and uwatenage (overarm throw).

== Personal life ==
On 25 December 2018 Chiyoshōma married a fellow Mongolian at the Mongolian embassy, a graduate of Mongolian State University she came to Japan for foreign language studies. They first met in August 2014 and have been in a relationship since January 2016.

In May 2024 it was announced that Chiyoshōma had acquired Japanese citizenship, which is required to remain in the Sumo Association as a coach upon retirement.

== Career record ==
Chiyoshōma Fujio
Year	January Hatsu basho, Tokyo	March Haru basho, Osaka	May Natsu basho, Tokyo	July Nagoya basho, Nagoya	September Aki basho, Tokyo	November Kyūshū basho, Fukuoka
2009	x	x	x	(Maezumō)	East Jonokuchi #31; 6–1	East Jonidan #65; 3–4
2010	West Jonidan #92; 5–2	East Jonidan #42; 4–3	East Jonidan #17; 4–3	East Sandanme #100; 4–3	East Sandanme #80; 2–5	East Jonidan #6; 5–2
2011	West Sandanme #72; 4–3	East Sandanme #55; Tournament Cancelled; Match fixing investigation 0–0–0	East Sandanme #55; 5–2	East Sandanme #13; 5–2	East Makushita #56; 3–4	West Sandanme #8; 3–4
2012	East Sandanme #23; 6–1	West Makushita #44; 2–5	West Sandanme #8; 5–2	West Makushita #48; 2–5	West Sandanme #11; 5–2	West Makushita #49; 5–2
2013	West Makushita #34; 3–4	East Makushita #41; 4–3	East Makushita #32; 4–3	East Makushita #25; 3–4	West Makushita #33; 3–4	East Makushita #40; 5–2
2014	East Makushita #25; 5–2	West Makushita #18; 5–2	East Makushita #10; 4–3	East Makushita #8; 3–4	East Makushita #13; 4–3	West Makushita #11; 3–4
2015	West Makushita #16; 2–5	West Makushita #30; 5–2	West Makushita #20; 4–3	West Makushita #15; 4–3	East Makushita #11; 6–1–PPP; Champion	West Makushita #3; 6–1
2016	West Jūryō #12; 8–7	East Jūryō #10; 11–4	West Jūryō #2; 7–8	West Jūryō #3; 9–6	West Maegashira #12; 8–7	East Maegashira #10; 9–6
2017	East Maegashira #6; 7–8	West Maegashira #7; 9–6	West Maegashira #2; 5–10	East Maegashira #5; 5–10	East Maegashira #8; 8–7	East Maegashira #6; 7–8
2018	East Maegashira #7; 6–9	East Maegashira #10; 9–6	East Maegashira #6; 6–9	East Maegashira #8; 4–11	East Maegashira #15; 8–7	East Maegashira #14; 7–8
2019	West Maegashira #14; 6–9	East Maegashira #17; 7–8	East Maegashira #17; 5–10	East Jūryō #3; 8–7	West Jūryō #2; 7–8	West Jūryō #3; 8–7
2020	West Jūryō #1; 7–8	East Jūryō #2; 8–7	West Jūryō #1; Tournament Cancelled; State of Emergency; 0–0–0	West Jūryō #1; 6–9	East Jūryō #4; 9–6	East Maegashira #16; 8–7
2021	West Maegashira #13; Sat out due to COVID rules 0–0–15	West Maegashira #13; 8–7	West Maegashira #11; 8–7	West Maegashira #7; 8–7	East Maegashira #5; 5–10	West Maegashira #7; 8–7
2022	West Maegashira #5; 4–11	East Maegashira #8; 5–10	West Maegashira #11; 6–9	West Maegashira #13; 7–8	East Maegashira #14; 9–6	West Maegashira #10; 7–8
2023	East Maegashira #11; 5–10	East Maegashira #16; 9–6	East Maegashira #13; 8–7	East Maegashira #12; 6–9	West Maegashira #15; 3–12	East Jūryō #6; 8–7
2024	East Jūryō #5; 7–8	West Jūryō #6; 9–6	West Jūryō #3; 12–3	East Maegashira #15; 5–5–5	East Jūryō #1; 10–5	East Maegashira #14; 11–4
2025	West Maegashira #5; 9–6	West Maegashira #2; 6–9 ★	West Maegashira #5; 4–11	West Maegashira #9; 1–14	West Jūryō #2; 9–6	East Maegashira #17; 10–5
2026	East Maegashira #11; 6–9	East Maegashira #14; 10–5	East Maegashira #7; 5–10	West Maegashira #10; 5–10	West Maegashira #14; 5–10	East Jūryō #1; 8–7
Record given as wins–losses–absences Top division champion Top division runner-up Retired Non-participation Jūryō Lower divisions Sanshō key: F=Fighting spirit; O=Outstanding performance; T=Technique Also shown: ★=Kinboshi; P=Playoff(s); Divisions: Makuuchi — Jūryō — Makushita — Sandanme — Jonidan — Jonokuchi Makuuchi ranks: Yokozuna — Ōzeki — Sekiwake — Komusubi — Maegashira

== See also ==
- Glossary of sumo terms
- List of active sumo wrestlers
- List of Mongolian sumo wrestlers
- List of non-Japanese sumo wrestlers
- List of active gold star earners
- List of sumo record holders
