= 2025 in sumo =

The following are the events in professional sumo during 2025.

== Tournaments ==
=== January ===
Hatsu basho

Ryōgoku Kokugikan, Tokyo, 12 January – 26 January

2025 Hatsu basho results – Makuuchi Division
W		L		A	East			Rank	West			W		L		A
2	-	3	-	0	ø	(Mongolia)	Terunofuji	Y	ø							
5	-	10	-	0		(Japan)	Kotozakura	O1		(Mongolia)	**Hōshōryū***	12	-	3	-	0
					ø			O2		(Japan)	**Ōnosato**	10	-	5	-	0
6	-	9	-	0		(Japan)	Wakamotoharu	S		(Japan)	**Daieishō**	11	-	4	-	0
7	-	8	-	0		(Japan)	Abi	K		(Japan)	Wakatakakage	7	-	8	-	0
6	-	9	-	0		(Japan)	Takanoshō	M1		(Mongolia)	**Kirishima**	11	-	4	-	0
7	-	8	-	0		(Japan)	Tobizaru	M2		(Japan)	Atamifuji	5	-	10	-	0
8	-	7	-	0		(Japan)	**Gōnoyama**	M3		(Japan)	**Ōhō**	12	-	3	-	0
6	-	9	-	0		(Japan)	Shōdai	M4		(Japan)	Ura	7	-	8	-	0
7	-	8	-	0		(Japan)	Hiradoumi	M5		(Mongolia)	**Chiyoshōma**	9	-	6	-	0
8	-	7	-	0		(Japan)	**Takayasu**	M6		(Japan)	**Ichiyamamoto**	8	-	7	-	0
6	-	9	-	0		(Japan)	Endō	M7		(Japan)	Mitakeumi	2	-	13	-	0
0	-	3	-	12	ø	(Russia)	Rōga	M8		(Japan)	Takarafuji	5	-	10	-	0
4	-	11	-	0		(Japan)	Churanoumi	M9		(Mongolia)	**Ōshōma**	8	-	7	-	0
9	-	6	-	0		(Mongolia)	**Tamawashi**	M10		(Japan)	Meisei	6	-	9	-	0
7	-	8	-	0		(Japan)	Midorifuji	M11		(Japan)	**Takerufuji**	10	-	5	-	0
8	-	7	-	0		(Japan)	**Nishikigi**	M12		(Mongolia)	Ōnokatsu	7	-	8	-	0
8	-	7	-	0		(Japan)	**Shōnannoumi**	M13		(Japan)	Kotoshōhō	5	-	10	-	0
0	-	0	-	15	ø	(Japan)	Hokutofuji	M14		(Kazakhstan)	**Kinbōzan**	12	-	3	-	0
10	-	5	-	0		(Japan)	**Hakuōhō**	M15	ø	(Japan)	Kitanowaka	4	-	5	-	6
6	-	9	-	0		(Mongolia)	Tamashōhō	M16		(Japan)	Kagayaki	6	-	9	-	0
9	-	6	-	0		(Japan)	**Nishikifuji**	M17		(Japan)	Tokihayate	7	-	8	-	0

ø – Indicates a pull-out or absent rank
**winning record in bold**
**Yūshō Winner**
*** Won 3-way Playoff**

==== Playoff ====
(Two consecutive victories required to win the Playoff and the yūshō)

- Match 1: Hōshōryū defeated Kinbōzan
- Match 2: Hōshōryū defeated Ōhō

=== March ===
Haru basho

Osaka Prefectural Gymnasium, Osaka, 9 March – 23 March

2025 Haru basho results – Makuuchi Division
W		L		A	East			Rank	West			W		L		A
5	-	5	-	5	ø	(Mongolia)	Hōshōryū	Y	ø							
12	-	3	-	0		(Japan)	**Ōnosato***	O		(Japan)	**Kotozakura**	8	-	7	-	0
9	-	6	-	0		(Japan)	**Daieishō**	S		(Japan)	Ōhō	6	-	9	-	0
8	-	7	-	0		(Mongolia)	**Kirishima**	K		(Japan)	Abi	6	-	9	-	0
9	-	6	-	0		(Japan)	**Wakatakakage**	M1		(Japan)	**Wakamotoharu**	9	-	6	-	0
7	-	8	-	0		(Japan)	Gōnoyama	M2		(Mongolia)	Chiyoshōma	6	-	9	-	0
6	-	9	-	0		(Japan)	Tobizaru	M3		(Japan)	Takanoshō	3	-	12	-	0
12	-	3	-	0		(Japan)	**Takayasu**	M4		(Japan)	Ichiyamamoto	7	-	8	-	0
7	-	8	-	0		(Japan)	Ura	M5		(Kazakhstan)	Kinbōzan	6	-	9	-	0
9	-	6	-	0		(Japan)	**Hiradoumi**	M6		(Japan)	**Takerufuji**	9	-	6	-	0
6	-	9	-	0		(Japan)	Shōdai	M7		(Mongolia)	**Tamawashi**	10	-	5	-	0
6	-	9	-	0		(Japan)	Atamifuji	M8		(Mongolia)	**Ōshōma**	9	-	6	-	0
9	-	6	-	0		(Japan)	**Hakuōhō**	M9		(Japan)	Endō	7	-	8	-	0
3	-	12	-	0		(Japan)	Nishikigi	M10		(Japan)	Shōnannoumi	4	-	11	-	0
9	-	6	-	0		(Japan)	**Midorifuji**	M11		(Japan)	**Meisei**	9	-	6	-	0
3	-	12	-	0		(Japan)	Takarafuji	M12		(Mongolia)	**Ōnokatsu**	10	-	5	-	0
0	-	2	-	13	ø	(Japan)	Nishikifuji	M13		(Ukraine)	**Shishi**	9	-	6	-	0
6	-	9	-	0		(Japan)	Ryūden	M14		(Japan)	**Churanoumi**	11	-	4	-	0
11	-	4	-	0		(Ukraine)	**Aonishiki**	M15		(Japan)	**Sadanoumi**	8	-	7	-	0
6	-	9	-	0		(Japan)	Asakōryū	M16		(Japan)	**Kotoshōhō**	8	-	7	-	0
6	-	9	-	0		(Japan)	Mitakeumi	M17		(Japan)	Shirokuma	5	-	10	-	0
10	-	5	-	0		(Japan)	**Tokihayate**	M18	ø							

ø – Indicates a pull-out or absent rank
**winning record in bold**
**Yūshō Winner**
*** Won Playoff**

=== May ===
Natsu basho

Ryōgoku Kokugikan, Tokyo, 11 May – 25 May

2025 Natsu basho results – Makuuchi Division
W		L		A	East		Rank	West			W		L		A
12	-	3	-	0	(Mongolia)	**Hōshōryū**	Y	ø							
14	-	1	-	0	(Japan)	**Ōnosato**	O		(Japan)	**Kotozakura**	8	-	7	-	0
10	-	5	-	0	(Japan)	**Daieishō**	S		(Mongolia)	**Kirishima**	11	-	4	-	0
6	-	9	-	0	(Japan)	Takayasu	K		(Japan)	**Wakatakakage**	12	-	3	-	0
7	-	8	-	0	(Japan)	Wakamotoharu	M1		(Japan)	Ōhō	7	-	8	-	0
7	-	8	-	0	(Japan)	Abi	M2		(Japan)	Gōnoyama	4	-	11	-	0
6	-	9	-	0	(Mongolia)	Tamawashi	M3		(Japan)	Hiradoumi	6	-	9	-	0
6	-	9	-	0	(Japan)	Takerufuji	M4		(Japan)	Ichiyamamoto	5	-	10	-	0
5	-	10	-	0	(Japan)	Ura	M5		(Mongolia)	Chiyoshōma	4	-	11	-	0
10	-	5	-	0	(Mongolia)	**Ōshōma**	M6		(Japan)	Tobizaru	7	-	8	-	0
8	-	7	-	0	(Japan)	**Hakuōhō**	M7		(Japan)	Churanoumi	4	-	11	-	0
10	-	5	-	0	(Mongolia)	**Ōnokatsu**	M8		(Kazakhstan)	**Kinbōzan**	10	-	5	-	0
11	-	4	-	0	(Ukraine)	**Aonishiki**	M9		(Japan)	Midorifuji	6	-	9	-	0
9	-	6	-	0	(Japan)	**Meisei**	M10		(Japan)	Shōdai	6	-	9	-	0
9	-	6	-	0	(Japan)	**Endō**	M11		(Ukraine)	Shishi	4	-	11	-	0
8	-	7	-	0	(Japan)	**Atamifuji**	M12		(Japan)	**Takanoshō**	8	-	7	-	0
8	-	7	-	0	(Japan)	**Tokihayate**	M13		(Japan)	**Sadanoumi**	10	-	5	-	0
6	-	4	-	5	(Japan)	Kotoshōhō	M14		(Russia)	**Rōga**	9	-	6	-	0
5	-	10	-	0	(Japan)	Ryūden	M15		(Japan)	Shōnannoumi	5	-	10	-	0
7	-	8	-	0	(Japan)	Kayō	M16		(Japan)	Nishikigi	6	-	9	-	0
4	-	11	-	0	(Mongolia)	Tamashōhō	M17		(Japan)	**Asakōryū**	10	-	5	-	0
4	-	11	-	0	(Japan)	Tochitaikai	M18	ø							

ø – Indicates a pull-out or absent rank
**winning record in bold**
**Yūshō Winner**

=== July ===
Nagoya basho

Aichi International Arena, Nagoya, 13 July – 27 July

2025 Nagoya basho results – Makuuchi Division
W		L		A	East			Rank	West			W		L		A
1	-	4	-	10	ø	(Mongolia)	Hōshōryū	Y		(Japan)	**Ōnosato**	11	-	4	-	0
8	-	7	-	0		(Japan)	**Kotozakura**	O	ø							
0	-	0	-	15	ø	(Japan)	Daieishō	S1		(Mongolia)	**Kirishima**	8	-	7	-	0
					ø			S2		(Japan)	**Wakatakakage**	10	-	5	-	0
3	-	12	-	0		(Mongolia)	Ōshōma	K		(Japan)	**Takayasu**	10	-	5	-	0
11	-	4	-	0		(Ukraine)	**Aonishiki**	M1		(Japan)	Wakamotoharu	6	-	9	-	0
7	-	8	-	0		(Japan)	Ōhō	M2		(Japan)	**Abi**	9	-	6	-	0
6	-	9	-	0		(Mongolia)	Ōnokatsu	M3		(Kazakhstan)	Kinbōzan	4	-	11	-	0
8	-	7	-	0		(Japan)	**Hakuōhō**	M4		(Mongolia)	**Tamawashi**	11	-	4	-	0
8	-	7	-	0		(Japan)	**Hiradoumi**	M5		(Japan)	Meisei	3	-	12	-	0
5	-	8	-	2	ø	(Japan)	Takerufuji	M6		(Japan)	**Gōnoyama**	9	-	6	-	0
3	-	10	-	2	ø	(Japan)	Tobizaru	M7	ø	(Japan)	Endō	0	-	0	-	15
4	-	11	-	0		(Japan)	Sadanoumi	M8		(Japan)	**Ichiyamamoto**	9	-	6	-	0
8	-	6	-	1	ø	(Japan)	**Ura**	M9		(Mongolia)	Chiyoshōma	1	-	14	-	0
11	-	4	-	0		(Japan)	**Atamifuji**	M10		(Russia)	Rōga	7	-	8	-	0
9	-	6	-	0		(Japan)	**Takanoshō**	M11		(Japan)	Tokihayate	6	-	9	-	0
9	-	6	-	0		(Japan)	**Midorifuji**	M12		(Japan)	Asakōryū	6	-	9	-	0
9	-	6	-	0		(Japan)	**Churanoumi**	M13		(Japan)	**Shōdai**	9	-	6	-	0
11	-	4	-	0		(Japan)	**Kusano**	M14		(Japan)	**Fujinokawa**	10	-	5	-	0
13	-	2	-	0		(Japan)	**Kotoshōhō**	M15		(Japan)	Hidenoumi	2	-	11	-	2
4	-	11	-	0		(Japan)	Kayō	M16		(Japan)	**Mitakeumi**	10	-	5	-	0
6	-	9	-	0		(Japan)	Kotoeihō	M17		(Ukraine)	Shishi	7	-	8	-	0

ø – Indicates a pull-out or absent rank
**winning record in bold**
**Yūshō Winner**

=== September ===
Aki basho

Ryōgoku Kokugikan, Tokyo, 14 September – 28 September

2025 Aki basho results - Makuuchi Division
W		L		A	East			Rank	West			W		L		A
13	-	2	-	0		(Japan)	**Ōnosato***	Y		(Mongolia)	**Hōshōryū**	13	-	2	-	0
9	-	5	-	1	ø	(Japan)	**Kotozakura**	O	ø							
6	-	9	-	0		(Japan)	Wakatakakage	S		(Mongolia)	Kirishima	6	-	9	-	0
7	-	8	-	0		(Japan)	Takayasu	K		(Ukraine)	**Aonishiki**	11	-	4	-	0
6	-	9	-	0		(Mongolia)	Tamawashi	M1		(Japan)	Abi	3	-	12	-	0
8	-	7	-	0		(Japan)	**Hakuōhō**	M2		(Japan)	**Ōhō**	10	-	5	-	0
5	-	10	-	0		(Japan)	Atamifuji	M3		(Japan)	Gōnoyama	1	-	14	-	0
8	-	7	-	0		(Japan)	**Hiradoumi**	M4		(Japan)	**Wakamotoharu**	9	-	6	-	0
3	-	12	-	0		(Japan)	Kotoshōhō	M5		(Japan)	Ichiyamamoto	4	-	11	-	0
7	-	8	-	0		(Mongolia)	Ōnokatsu	M6		(Japan)	**Kusano**	8	-	7	-	0
12	-	3	-	0		(Japan)	**Takanoshō**	M7		(Mongolia)	**Ōshōma**	9	-	6	-	0
10	-	5	-	0		(Japan)	**Ura**	M8		(Kazakhstan)	Kinbōzan	7	-	8	-	0
7	-	8	-	0		(Japan)	Midorifuji	M9		(Japan)	Fujinokawa	6	-	9	-	0
7	-	8	-	0		(Japan)	Daieishō	M10		(Japan)	**Churanoumi**	9	-	6	-	0
10	-	5	-	0		(Japan)	**Shōdai**	M11		(Russia)	Rōga	7	-	8	-	0
0	-	0	-	15	ø	(Japan)	Takerufuji	M12		(Japan)	Mitakeumi	7	-	8	-	0
5	-	10	-	0		(Japan)	Meisei	M13		(Japan)	Tokihayate	7	-	8	-	0
6	-	9	-	0		(Japan)	Sadanoumi	M14		(Japan)	Asakōryū	6	-	9	-	0
9	-	6	-	0		(Japan)	**Tobizaru**	M15		(Japan)	Shōnannoumi	7	-	8	-	0
9	-	6	-	0		(Japan)	**Tomokaze**	M16		(Japan)	Nishikigi	2	-	13	-	0
9	-	6	-	0		(Japan)	**Ryūden**	M17		(Japan)	Hitoshi	7	-	8	-	0
10	-	5	-	0		(Ukraine)	**Shishi**	M18	ø							

ø - Indicates a pull-out or absent rank
**winning record in bold**
**Yūshō Winner**
*** Won Playoff**

=== October ===
London exhibition

Royal Albert Hall, London, 15 October – 19 October

2025 London exhibition results - Makuuchi Division (results have no bearing on future rankings)
W		L		A	East			Rank	West			W		L		A
4	-	1	-	0		(Japan)	**Ōnosato**	Y		(Mongolia)	**Hōshōryū**	5	-	0	-	0
					ø	(Japan)	Kotozakura	O	ø							
2	-	3	-	0		(Japan)	Wakatakakage	S		(Mongolia)	**Kirishima**	3	-	2	-	0
4	-	1	-	0		(Japan)	**Takayasu**	**K**		(Ukraine)	**Aonishiki**	4	-	1	-	0
3	-	2	-	0		(Mongolia)	**Tamawashi**	M1		(Japan)	Abi	2	-	3	-	0
3	-	2	-	0		(Japan)	**Hakuōhō**	M2		(Japan)	Ōhō	2	-	3	-	0
1	-	4	-	0		(Japan)	Atamifuji	M3		(Japan)	Gōnoyama	2	-	3	-	0
2	-	3	-	0		(Japan)	Hiradoumi	M4		(Japan)	**Wakamotoharu**	4	-	1	-	0
2	-	3	-	0		(Japan)	Kotoshōhō	M5		(Japan)	Ichiyamamoto	0	-	5	-	0
3	-	2	-	0		(Mongolia)	**Ōnokatsu**	M6	ø	(Japan)	Kusano					
2	-	3	-	0		(Japan)	Takanoshō	M7		(Mongolia)	**Ōshōma**	3	-	2	-	0
3	-	2	-	0		(Japan)	**Ura**	M8		(Kazakhstan)	Kinbōzan	2	-	3	-	0
2	-	3	-	0		(Japan)	Midorifuji	M9		(Japan)	Fujinokawa	2	-	3	-	0
2	-	3	-	0		(Japan)	Daieishō	M10		(Japan)	Churanoumi	2	-	3	-	0
1	-	4	-	0		(Japan)	Shōdai	M11		(Russia)	**Rōga**	3	-	2	-	0
2	-	3	-	0		(Japan)	Takerufuji	M12		(Japan)	**Mitakeumi**	4	-	1	-	0
					ø	(Japan)	Meisei	M13		(Japan)	Tokihayate	1	-	4	-	0
4	-	1	-	0		(Japan)	**Sadanoumi**	M14		(Japan)	Asakōryū	2	-	3	-	0
4	-	1	-	0		(Japan)	**Tobizaru**	M15		(Japan)	Shōnannoumi	2	-	3	-	0
					ø	(Japan)	Tomokaze	M16		(Japan)	Nishikigi	1	-	4	-	0
3	-	2	-	0		(Japan)	**Ryūden**	M17		(Japan)	**Hitoshi**	3	-	2	-	0
4	-	1	-	0		(Ukraine)	**Shishi**	M18	ø							
1	-	4	-	0		(Japan)	**Kotoeihō**	J		(Japan)	Ōshōumi	1	-	4	-	0

ø - Indicates a pull-out or absent rank
**winning record in bold**
**Yūshō Winner**

=== November ===
Kyushu basho

Fukuoka Kokusai Center, Kyushu, 9 November – 23 November

2025 Kyushu basho results - Makuuchi Division
W		L		A	East		Rank	West			W		L		A
11	-	4	-	0	(Japan)	**Ōnosato**	Y		(Mongolia)	**Hōshōryū**	12	-	3	-	0
8	-	7	-	0	(Japan)	**Kotozakura**	O	ø							
12	-	3	-	0	(Ukraine)	**Aonishiki***	S		(Japan)	Ōhō	7	-	8	-	0
5	-	10	-	0	(Japan)	Takanoshō	K		(Japan)	**Takayasu**	8	-	7	-	0
6	-	9	-	0	(Japan)	Hakuōhō	M1		(Japan)	Wakatakakage	7	-	8	-	0
11	-	4	-	0	(Mongolia)	**Kirishima**	M2		(Japan)	**Wakamotoharu**	8	-	7	-	0
4	-	11	-	0	(Japan)	Hiradoumi	M3		(Japan)	**Ura**	8	-	7	-	0
7	-	8	-	0	(Mongolia)	Tamawashi	M4		(Mongolia)	Ōshōma	4	-	11	-	0
9	-	6	-	0	(Japan)	**Yoshinofuji**	M5		(Japan)	Shōdai	4	-	11	-	0
8	-	7	-	0	(Japan)	**Atamifuji**	M6		(Mongolia)	Ōnokatsu	7	-	8	-	0
8	-	7	-	0	(Japan)	**Churanoumi**	M7		(Japan)	Abi	5	-	10	-	0
11	-	4	-	0	(Japan)	**Ichiyamamoto**	M8		(Kazakhstan)	Kinbōzan	7	-	8	-	0
6	-	9	-	0	(Japan)	Midorifuji	M9		(Japan)	Tobizaru	6	-	9	-	0
10	-	5	-	0	(Japan)	**Daieishō**	M10		(Japan)	Kotoshōhō	7	-	8	-	0
6	-	9	-	0	(Ukraine)	Shishi	M11		(Russia)	**Rōga**	8	-	7	-	0
9	-	6	-	0	(Japan)	**Fujinokawa**	M12		(Japan)	Tomokaze	7	-	8	-	0
9	-	6	-	0	(Japan)	**Gōnoyama**	M13		(Japan)	Mitakeumi	7	-	8	-	0
7	-	8	-	0	(Japan)	Ryūden	M14		(Japan)	**Tokihayate**	9	-	6	-	0
9	-	6	-	0	(Japan)	**Nishikifuji**	M15		(Japan)	Shōnannoumi	3	-	12	-	0
7	-	8	-	0	(Japan)	Ōshōumi	M16		(Japan)	Sadanoumi	4	-	11	-	0
10	-	5	-	0	(Mongolia)	**Chiyoshōma**	M17		(Japan)	**Asakōryū**	8	-	7	-	0
1	-	5	-	9	(Japan)	Meisei	M18	ø							

ø - Indicates a pull-out or absent rank
**winning record in bold**
**Yūshō Winner**
*** Won Playoff**

== News ==
=== January ===
- 11: The Japan Sumo Association announces that 2,955 envelopes of prize money (called kenshō-kin) will be distributed to winning wrestlers at the upcoming January grand sumo tournament, setting an all-time record. On the first day of the tournament–244 prize money envelopes are distributed, establishing a single-day record. Among the sponsor banners paraded during the tournament are those promoting the future Major League Baseball Tokyo Series games, featuring photos of Shohei Ohtani and other Japanese baseball players.
- 12: Maegashira competitors Rōga and Hokutofuji withdraw at the start of the January tournament. Roga suffered a torn thigh muscle a week earlier and is reported to be considering entry into the tournament while it is in progress, while Hokutofuji has spine and knee issues that are expected to take until the end of the month to heal.
- 16: Yokozuna Terunofuji withdraws on the fifth day of the January tournament after suffering a first-day loss to Wakatakakage and conceding a gold star victory to Tobizaru on Day 4. It is his 13th absence in 21 tournaments at sumo's highest rank. Later, it is rumored that Terunofuji has decided to retire.
- 17: The Sumo Association officially announces Terunofuji's retirement. His retirement would leave the sumo rankings without a yokozuna for the first time since the March 1993 tournament. He will remain with the Sumo Association coaching at Isegahama stable under the ring name of Terunofuji, which his status as a former yokozuna allows him to do.
- 18: Rōga withdraws for a second time after re-entering the January tournament on Day 5 and suffering two consecutive losses.
- 19: The Sumo Association announces that it will hold a sumo exhibition in the Accor Arena of Paris in June 2026, following the announcement of a 2025 London tour. The Sumo Association will be returning to Paris for the third time in its history.
  On Day 8 of the January tournament, maegashira Kitanowaka loses his match after getting his right foot trapped on the straw bales when he retreated from an attack by Takerufuji. Kitanowaka is removed from the dohyō in a wheelchair and is subsequently diagnosed with a broken ankle, forcing his withdrawal.
- 26: Ōzeki Hōshōryū, the nephew of the 68th yokozuna Asashōryū, stages a late comeback on the final day of the January 2025 tournament to win his second Emperor's Cup and, as a result, is set to become the sport's 74th yokozuna. Hōshōryū entered Day 15 tied with maegashira Ōhō and one win behind maegashira and tournament leader Kinbōzan. Hōshōryū first needed help from Ōhō, who defeated Kinbōzan in their regularly scheduled final day contest, to remain in contention. With a playoff between Kinbōzan and Ōhō assured, Hōshōryū joined the playoff by defeating struggling ōzeki Kotozakura. In the three-way playoff, a wrestler needs to win two consecutive matches to claim victory. Kinbōzan and Hōshōryū drew first, and Hōshōryū powered himself to victory by force-out. In the second match Ōhō denied Hōshōryū his favorite grip from the outset and after a stalemate, Hōshōryū sent Ōhō down to the dohyō to clinch the tournament win. Hōshōryū's victory ensures that the lack of a yokozuna following the retirement of Terunofuji will be brief, as the Yokozuna Deliberation Council will meet on 27 January and is expected to formally recommend Hōshōryū's promotion. Two days after the meeting, the full board of the Sumo Association is expected to give their final approval. The two runner-ups in the top division receive their first special prizes for their efforts, with Kinbōzan receiving the Kantō-shō (Fighting Spirit prize) and Ōhō receiving the Ginō-shō (Technique prize). A second Fighting Spirit prize is given to former ōzeki Kirishima, who remained in contention for the championship until he was defeated on Day 14. Meanwhile Kotozakura, the other yokozuna candidate, suffers a losing record and will need to win eight matches at the next tournament in March to hold on to his ōzeki rank.
  Ukrainian Shishi (13–2) takes his first career championship in professional sumo, winning the jūryō division and likely securing a return promotion to the top division.
- 27: In a unanimous decision, the Yokozuna Deliberation Council recommends Hōshōryū's promotion to yokozuna.
- 29: The Sumo Association accepts the recommendation of the Yokozuna Deliberation Council and unanimously promotes Hōshōryū to become the sport's 74th yokozuna. The date also marks the 22nd anniversary of the promotion of Hōshōryū's uncle, Asashōryū, to the same rank. In his acceptance speech, Hōshōryū said that he will "continue to work hard with a strong determination in order not to tarnish" his new rank.
  The Sumo Association announces five promotions to the second-highest jūryō division. Three are promoted for the first time. One is 23-year-old Kusano, a National Student Sumo champion and subsequent makushita tsukedashi entrant into the sport. The others are 21-year-olds Wakanoshō and Ōtsuji, both of whom had placed third in the National Junior High School Sumo championships. Kazekenō returns to the second division after competing in jūryō last May, while four-time lower division champion Hitoshi returns for the first time since November 2023.
- 30: Fuji Television decides to withdraw its broadcast of the Japan Grand Sumo Tournament, a 49-year-old charity event to be held on 9 February at the Ryōgoku Kokugikan. The decision comes after the sexual misconduct scandal of television presenter and former SMAP member Masahiro Nakai, and the subsequent withdrawal of sponsors from Fuji TV programming.
  The Japan Sumo Association announces the suspension of Kimura Kankurō, a jūryō-ranked gyōji, for the March tournament and a pay cut after he was found to be the perpetrator of a physical assault on one of his apprentices at the November 2024 tournament.
- 31: With Asashōryū among the family members in attendance, Hōshōryū's first ring-entering ceremony as a yokozuna is held at Meiji Shrine. Stablemate Meisei serves as the dew sweeper, and Hiradoumi is the sword bearer.

=== February ===
- 1: The retirement ceremony for former maegashira Tokushōryū is held at the Ryōgoku Kokugikan.
- 8: The NHK charity sumo tournament is held at the Ryōgoku Kokugikan with around 4,500 people attending.
- 9: The 49th Japan Grand Sumo Tournament, a one-day competition for professional sumo wrestlers, is held at the Ryōgoku Kokugikan. Although organizer and broadcaster Fuji Television decided to withdraw the broadcast of the tournament after the scandal involving Masahiro Nakai, the tournament was sold out. Several changes were made to the tournament's usual organization, including the discontinuation of matches between toshiyori (retired wrestlers), radio broadcasting and post-match prize-giving. The tournament winner is Takayasu—who wins this tournament for the third time—with the former ōzeki defeating opponents such as new yokozuna Hōshōryū, before winning the championship match against Wakamotoharu.
- 25: The rankings are released for the March grand sumo tournament in Osaka, marking the yokozuna debut of Hōshōryū. One of the two promotions in the san'yaku division is January runner-up Ōhō, who is elevated to the sekiwake rank for the first time in his career. Former ōzeki Kirishima is promoted to komusubi after having been demoted to maegashira in the previous tournament. Brothers Wakatakakage and Wakamotoharu find themselves ranked together as the top maegashira competitors, both demoted from san'yaku after suffering losing records in January. Entering the top division from jūryō are six wrestlers, including one promoted for the first time. Two-time lower division champion Aonishiki reaches the top division in nine tournaments, joining Takerufuji and the former Jōkōryū for the fastest promotion to that level since their debut. Aonishiki is also the second Ukrainian to be promoted to the top division—the first being Shishi, who returns to maegashira after winning the January jūryō title. With the two competing in makuuchi, Ukraine becomes the seventh foreign country in the history of the sport (after the United States, Mongolia, Georgia, Russia, Bulgaria and South Korea) to have two or more wrestlers reaching the top division. Ryūden, Sadanoumi and Asakōryū all return to the top division after having just been demoted, while Shirokuma returns for the first time in two tournaments. Hokutofuji, who sat out of the January tournament due to health issues, drops to jūryō after spending over eight years in the top division.

=== March ===
- 18: Hōshōryū becomes the first yokozuna since the 1986 to withdraw from their first tournament at sumo's highest rank. After being defeated on the opening day by komusubi Abi, Hōshōryū conceded three kinboshi over a five-day stretch to Chiyoshōma, Takayasu and Ichiyamamoto before pulling out on Day 10. His official paperwork cites a neck sprain and right elbow injury, requiring two weeks of recovery.
- 20: The jūryō championship is mathematically clinched on Day 12 of the March 2025 tournament by the bottom-ranked Kusano, who maintains a perfect record and a three-win advantage over his closest opponents. The 23-year-old Nihon University graduate earlier became the first wrestler in sumo history to win his first ten matches as a new jūryō competitor. He is also the third wrestler in the history of the 15-day tournament system, after former ōzeki Yutakayama in 1961 and former maegashira Kotonofuji in 1977, to clinch the jūryō title in 12 days. His perfect win record is broken on Day 13.
- 23: Ōzeki Ōnosato defeats former ōzeki Takayasu in a playoff to secure his third championship in the top division. The two were tied entering the final day of competition, and each won their regularly scheduled Day 15 bouts to finish at 12–3. Takayasu defeated Ōnosato on Day 10, but in the title-deciding playoff it was Ōnosato who emerged victorious by rear push out after Takayasu grabbed his belt and failed in an attempt to execute a throw. With his first title as an ōzeki, the 24-year-old Ōnosato becomes a candidate for promotion to the highest rank of yokozuna at the next tournament in May. Takayasu has yet to win a top-division championship, but does earn a gold star for defeating Hōshōryū and receives his third Technique prize. Two other maegashira competitors that were in contention–Churanoumi and Ukrainian top-division newcomer Aonishiki–each finished with 11 wins and their first Fighting Spirit prize. Despite being defeated by Ōnosato in the final tournament match before the playoff, ōzeki Kotozakura finishes with eight wins to escape kadoban status.
- 26: The Sumo Association holds their May rankings meeting and announces four promotions to the second-highest jūryō division. One of three new promotions is 26-year-old Miyagi, who followed the former Yoshikaze to the recently established Nakamura stable. Upon the release of the May rankings Miyagi will change his shikona to Miyanokaze, using the "kaze" from his stablemaster's former ring name. The other two competitors new to the division are both 23 years of age: Mudōhō, who won the makushita championship last January, and Mita, who is promoted to jūryō in his fifth tournament after entering sumo as a makushita tsukedashi. Former maegashira Daiamami returns to the second-highest division after just being demoted.

The spring jungyō (regional tours) were held at the following locations in March:

- 30: Ise Shrine, Mie (Ceremonial tournament)
- 31: Hirakata

=== April ===
- 10: As YouTube channels of heya increased in popularity, the Sumo Association publishes official YouTube management guidelines. Under the association's rules, sumo stables with YouTube channels are expected to "protect the traditions and credibility of sumo." Prohibited practices include video releases during honbasho, live streams, online donations, collaborations with other stables, and videos that "damage sumo culture and the dignity of wrestlers" such as practical jokes. Stables that violate the rules will be prohibited from using social media. To meet the new requirements, a training course for all association members was scheduled for June 2, led among others by Shunichi Tokura, commissioner for Cultural Affairs of Japan.
- 15: The Sumo Association announces the death of jonidan-ranked wrestler Wakatozakura at the age of 33 from necrotizing fasciitis (flesh-eating disease). It is the first death of an active sumo wrestler in five years.
- 28: The rankings for the May 2025 grand sumo tournament are released by the Sumo Association. The top division sees two former ōzeki earn promotions in san'yaku, with Kirishima returning to sekiwake for the first time in three tournaments and Takayasu–the runner-up in the last tournament to yokozuna candidate Ōnosato–returning to komusubi for the first time since January 2024. Wakatakakage, who was last ranked in san'yaku two years ago when he sat out due to a knee injury and was subsequently relegated, returns to the rank of komusubi. Two new wrestlers are promoted to the makuuchi ranks. The first is 25-year-old Kayō, who entered sumo three years ago after finishing in the top eight in both the All Japan Sumo Championships and National Student Sumo Championships, thus qualifying him under the sandanme tsukedashi system. He is the first top division wrestler for Nakamura stable since its founding last year by former sekiwake Yoshikaze. The other is 25-year-old Tochitaikai, who won back-to-back lower division titles in his first two ranked tournaments in 2018. His makuuchi promotion is the first for Kasugano stable in 14 years. Rōga and Tamashōhō return to the top division, both of them were demoted to jūryō in the January 2025 tournament. March jūryō champion Kusano is promoted to jūryō 1, while former ōzeki Mitakeumi drops to jūryō after spending almost ten years in the top division. This will also mark the final tournament as a stablemaster for Isegahama (the 63rd yokozuna Asahifuji).

The spring jungyō (regional tours) were held at the following locations in April:

- 1: Kinokawa, Wakayama
- 2: Kishiwada, Osaka
- 3: Kashihara, Nara
- 4: Seki, Gifu
- 5: Nanao, Ishikawa
- 6: Toyama
- 7: Tsubata, Ishikawa
- 8: Tsuruga, Fukui
- 9: Chita, Aichi
- 12: Fujisawa, Kanagawa
- 13: Chiba
- 14: Yasukuni Shrine, Tokyo (Ceremonial tournament)
- 15: Ōta, Tokyo
- 16: Tsukuba
- 17: Hokota, Ibaraki
- 18: Utsunomiya
- 19: Ōta, Gunma
- 20: Takasaki
- 23: Jōsō
- 24: Kawasaki, Kanagawa
- 25: Hadano, Kanagawa
- 26: Yokohama
- 27: Hachiōji

=== May ===
- 11: On the opening day of the May tournament, it is announced that maegashira Kotoshōhō will be absent due to a bicep injury. He would later join the competition on Day 6.
- 15: Former komusubi Hokutofuji announces his retirement, ending a 10-year professional sumo career. He will remain with the Sumo Association and Hakkaku stable as an elder under the name Ōyama.
- 23: Ōzeki Ōnosato clinches his second straight top division championship of the year, and fourth title overall, with a victory on Day 13 and a three-win lead over his nearest opponents. The result all but assures that the 24-year-old will become sumo's 75th yokozuna. He will be the first Japanese yokozuna since his stablemaster Nishonoseki (the 72nd yokozuna Kisenosato) ascended to the top rank in 2017.
- 24: 48-year-old former makushita Satonofuji, best known as the wrestler who holds the record for the most bow-twirling ceremony performances, announces that he will end his professional sumo career of almost three decades.
- 25: Ōnosato (14–1) collects the Emperor's Cup as the May 2025 top division champion following his defeat at the hands of yokozuna Hōshōryū (12–3), who denied Ōnosato from finishing the tournament with a perfect record. The Sumo Association hands out four special prizes: Aonishiki (11–4) and Sadanoumi (10–5) both take home the Fighting Spirit prize, while Kirishima (11–4) and Wakatakakage (12–3) both receive the Technique prize. The process of Ōnosato's promotion to join Hōshōryū at sumo's highest rank formally begins, with Sumo Association president Hakkaku (the 61st yokozuna Hokutoumi) approving the request of the judging department to hold an extraordinary board meeting on 28 May.
  Kusano (13–2) clinches his second straight championship in jūryō, and a likely promotion to the top division for July. He is the fourth competitor since 1989 to win two consecutive tournaments after being promoted to jūryō for the first time.
- 26: The Yokozuna Deliberation Council unanimously recommends Ōnosato's promotion to yokozuna.
- 27: The Sumo Association's compliance committee is investigating allegations that a gyōji who manages the reserve fund of the rikishi-kai (wrestlers' association, composed of active sekitori competitors) embezzled money from that fund. According to the report, the gyōji repeatedly deferred requests by the rikishi-kai to disclose the fund's books and balance, and later confessed to spending tens of millions of yen on gambling and other activities. Portions of the fund were designated to support children affected by the 2011 Tōhoku earthquake and tsunami. It is later reported that the gyōji submitted his resignation to the Sumo Association, which was not accepted pending the outcome of the investigation.
- 28: Ōnosato officially becomes professional sumo's 75th yokozuna after his promotion by the Sumo Association's board of directors. Similar to what was said in his ōzeki promotion speech in September 2024, Ōnosato says that he will strive to be a yuiitsu-muni (唯一無二, 'one-of-a-kind' or 'unique') yokozuna.
  The Sumo Association announces two promotions to jūryō for July: Ōtsuji, who won the May makushita title with a perfect record after having been demoted in a previous tournament, and former maegashira Kōtokuzan, who returns to salaried status for the first time in two years.
- 29: The Japan Sumo Association announces a one-day tournament on October 7 at the Ryōgoku Kokugikan to commemorate the centenary of the association's founding, modelled on a 1995 Heian-era inspired tournament.
- 30: Ōnosato performs his first ring-entering ceremony as a yokozuna at Meiji Shrine, with Ryūden as the dew sweeper and Takayasu as the sword bearer. It is announced beforehand that the inner shrine grounds would be closed to the public due to weather concerns, marking the first time that this has happened in the history, excluding Terunofuji's ceremony which was held during the COVID-19 pandemic. Despite this, approximately 1,000 people gather at the entrance to witness the ceremony.
- 31: The retirement ceremony for former maegashira Kotoekō is held at the Ryōgoku Kokugikan. Ōnosato performs his first public yokozuna dohyō-iri at the event.

=== June ===
- 1: Retirement ceremonies are held for former komusubi Ōnoshō at the Ryōgoku Kokugikan, and for former maegashira Kyokutaisei at a hotel in Tokyo.
- 2: At an extraordinary board meeting, the Sumo Association considers the resignation of 45-time top division champion Miyagino (yokozuna Hakuhō) and decides to accept it effective 9 June. On that date, Isegahama (yokozuna Asahifuji) will take over the Miyagino kabu, or elder stock, and the Isegahama name and Isegahama stable will be transferred to the 73rd yokozuna Terunofuji. Isegahama will remain affiliated with Isegahama stable as a coach, and upon reaching his 65th birthday the following month will retire and immediately start his re-employment with the Sumo Association as a san'yo (consultant).
  The Sumo Association board dismisses makuuchi-gyōji Kimura Ginjirō, identified as the individual who embezzled money from the reserve fund of the rikishi-kai.
- 4: The Sumo Association opens an office at the new Aichi International Arena in Nagoya ahead of the July grand sumo tournament. The Nagoya basho is set to move to the new arena this year from the nearby Aichi Prefectural Gymnasium.
- 9: Hakuhō's departure from the Sumo Association is finalized. In a press conference, Hakuhō expressed his wish to develop sumo from an outside perspective and share sumo's appeal with many people around the world.
- 27: The Chiba District Court dismisses a lawsuit brought by Daisuke Yanagihara (former sandanme Kotokantetsu) against the Japan Sumo Association. The 2013 lawsuit alleged that Yanagihara was forced to retire as a professional sumo wrestler when he was told he could not withdraw from the January 2021 sumo tournament because of his concerns over contracting COVID-19. The following month, Yanagihara declined to file an appeal.
- 30: The Sumo Association releases the banzuke for the July 2025 grand sumo tournament–the first to be held at the new Aichi International Arena. The new arena will see a 25-year-old, Ōnosato, make his debut at sumo's top rank of yokozuna. Ōnosato and Hōshōryū became sumo's first yokozuna pair in four years. With Kotozakura now the lone ōzeki competitor, the rankings committee adds a third sekiwake: May runner-up Wakatakakge, who returns to sekiwake and becomes the third wrestler in sumo history after Kotokaze and Terunofuji to return to that rank after previously falling below jūryō. Following a ten-win performance at the rank of maegashira 6, and with top-ranked maegashira faring poorly in the May tournament, Mongolian Ōshōma is promoted all the way up to komusubi. It is the first san'yaku promotion for Naruto stable, which was founded in 2017 by former ōzeki Kotoōshū. Ukrainian Aonishiki jumps from maegashira 9 to the top of the rank-and-file after his fourth straight tournament with double-digit wins. Five wrestlers are promoted from jūryō to maegashira, including three joining the top division for the first time. As expected, one is the back-to-back jūryō champion Kusano, who enters the top division in just his eighth professional tournament after joining professional sumo last year as a makushita tsukedashi competitor. The second is 20-year-old Wakaikari, the son of Kabutoyama (former maegashira Ōikari), who takes on the new shikona Fujinokawa. The third is 21-year-old Kotoeihō, who in 2022 won back-to-back lower division championships in his first two professional tournaments. Two wrestlers return to the top division: One is former ōzeki Mitakeumi, who returns after having just been demoted. The other is Hidenoumi, the elder brother of Tobizaru who returns for the first time since his suspension by the Sumo Association in January 2022 for participation in illegal gambling.

=== July ===
- 11: Two top division wrestlers from Oitekaze stable, sekiwake Daieishō and maegashira Endō, pull out of the July tournament. Daieishō's stablemaster says that Daieishō injured himself during training at the stable, which worsened while at their training grounds in Yokkaichi ahead of the tournament. While he initially leaves open the possibility that Daieishō could re-enter the tournament at some point, Daieishō's official medical certificate later indicates that he will need about 2 months of treatment. Meanwhile, Endō is expected to be out of action for 1–2 months after undergoing knee surgery the previous day.
- 13: Nikolay Ivanov, the former maegashira Amūru, is one of two men arrested on suspicion of sexual assault and robbery against a woman at a karaoke bar in Tokyo.
- 17: Two more top division wrestlers, yokozuna Hōshōryū and maegashira Hidenoumi, withdraw on day 5 of the July tournament. Hōshōryū conceded three straight kinboshi to rank-and-filers from the second day, and becomes the third yokozuna in modern sumo history to withdraw twice in their first three tournaments at sumo's highest rank. Hōshōryū's stablemaster later says that the yokozuna has a bone crack in his left big toe. Hidenoumi pulls out after going winless in his first four matches, with a right calf injury in his Day 4 contest as the reason for the pullout. He returned to competition on Day 8.
- 22: The July tournament's remaining yokozuna, Ōnosato, yields his third kinboshi to Tamawashi. The 40-year-old Tamawashi becomes the oldest maegashira-ranked competitor in sumo history to record a gold star win by defeating a yokozuna.
- 25: Ōnosato loses to maegashira Kotoshōhō, setting a new record for the most kinboshi conceded by a yokozuna in their debut at sumo's highest rank.
  Two additional wrestlers pull out of the July tournament. One is Takerufuji, who appeared to have injured his right arm after defeating Sadanoumi the previous week. He competed for six more days before pulling out due to arm pain, and he was later diagnosed with a bicep tear which will require about two months of treatment. The other withdrawal, Tobizaru, reportedly suffered right elbow injuries in morning practice on July 22 and will require about four weeks of rest and treatment.
- 26: Ura, who had already secured a winning record, becomes the sixth top-division wrestler to pull out of the July tournament. He withdraws after he injures his knee in his Day 13 loss to Wakatakakage.
- 27: Kotoshōhō (13–2) clinches his first Emperor's Cup and fourth overall championship at the July 2025 tournament in Nagoya. The 25-year-old, who first entered the top division in May 2020, entered the final day of competition as the sole leader ahead of Ukrainian Aonishiki and makuuchi newcomer Kusano, which meant the Emperor's Cup trophy was guaranteed to go to a first-time winner. Facing Aonishiki on Day 15, Kotoshōhō used a strong shoulder charge before thrusting Aonishiki down to the dohyō. In addition to the Emperor's Cup, Kotoshōhō was handed the Outstanding Performance prize and Fighting Spirit prizes for his efforts. Aonishiki finished his third consecutive tournament in the top division with 11 wins and a special prize, taking home his first Technique prize. Kusano (11–4) is awarded both the Fighting Spirit and Technique prizes in his first top-division tournament. Another wrestler who debuted in the top division in July, Fujinokawa, gets 10 wins and receives the Fighting Spirit prize. The Outstanding Performance prize is also awarded to 40-year-old Mongolian sumo veteran Tamawashi (11–4), who becomes the oldest wrestler in history to receive a special prize. Despite yielding four kinboshi, Ōnosato finishes his first tournament at sumo's highest rank of yokozuna with 11 wins. Among the other strong finishers is sekiwake Wakatakakage (10–5), who can earn promotion to sumo's second-highest rank of ōzeki if he can win 11 matches at the next tournament in September.
  23-year-old Mita, a makushita tsukedashi entrant last September, wins the jūryō championship for his first professional sumo title.
- 30: The Sumo Association announces that five wrestlers have been promoted to jūryō for the September tournament. One is former ōzeki Asanoyama, who returned to sekitori status at the start of 2023 but was sidelined in September 2024 after he tore his ACL. The other four are promoted to jūryō for the first time, including two from Takasago stable where Asanoyama trains: Mongolian Asahakuryū, who won the July makushita title with a perfect record, and Ishizaki, a makushita tsukedashi entrant who will take on the shikona Asasuiryū. Another Mongolian, Kyokukaiyū, enters the sekitori ranks in his eleventh professional tournament. Also promoted is 24-year-old Nishinoryū, whose first bout was at the end of 2018.
- 31: The Sumo Association approves a transfer of elder stock, with Kumagatani (former maegashira Tamaasuka) taking the Ōtake name and becoming stablemaster of Ōtake stable by exchanging kabu with former jūryō Dairyū. The change will be effective on 29 September, one day before Dairyū reaches sumo's mandatory retirement age of 65.

=== August ===
- 29: The former yokozuna Hakuhō announces plans for the Hakuhō Cup, a junior sumo event inaugurated in 2010, to return in February 2026 at the Toyota Arena Tokyo. It will be the first time in the history of the event that a women's competition will be held, as females were not permitted to participate when the event took place at the Ryōgoku Kokugikan.

The summer jungyō (regional tours) were held at the following locations:

- 3: Osaka — Expo 2025
- 4: Gifu
- 5: Fukui
- 7: Koga, Ibaraki
- 8: Minamisōma, Fukushima
- 9: Kōriyama
- 10: Yamanobe, Yamagata
- 11-12: Sendai
- 13: Morioka
- 15: Obihiro
- 16: Asahikawa
- 17-18: Sapporo
- 20: Aomori
- 21: Yurihonjō, Akita
- 22: Fukushima
- 23: Niigata
- 24: Nagaoka, Niigata
- 25: Kanazawa
- 26: Kariya, Aichi
- 27: Shizuoka
- 28: Tachikawa, Tokyo
- 29: Ushiku, Ibaraki
- 30: Asahi, Chiba
- 31: Kasukabe, Saitama

=== September ===
- 1: The Japan Sumo Association publishes the rankings for the September 2025 grand sumo tournament. At the top of the banzuke, July runner-up Ōnosato moves to the east side in his second tournament at sumo's highest rank of yokozuna, swapping places with Hōshōryū. The san'yaku ranks see the promotion of another July runner-up, Aonishiki, to komusubi. The Ukrainian is the first san'yaku promotion for Ajigawa stable. He becomes the fastest to go from their debut tournament to the ranks above maegshira since the introduction of the six-tournament system in 1958 (except tsukedashi competitors), doing so in 12 tournaments. The previous record of 14 tournaments was held by former yokozuna Asashōryū and former ōzeki Konishiki and Kotoōshū. Wakatakakage moves from west to east sekiwake as he bids for 11 wins, which would earn him a promotion to sumo's second-highest rank of ōzeki. The July top division champion Kotoshōhō jumps ten places in the rankings to maegashira 5. There is one wrestler promoted to the top division for the first time: 28-year-old Hitoshi, a four-time champion in the lower divisions who has posted winning records since his promotion to jūryō in March, including a 10-win performance in July. The four others returning to maegashira all finished with winning records as the top-ranked jūryō competitors in July: Shōnannoumi, Tomokaze, Nishikigi and Ryūden.
- 7: The retirement ceremony for former sekiwake Aoiyama is held in the main hall at the Ryōgoku Kokugikan.
- 12: Takerufuji, who is continuing to recover after suffering a bicep tear during the July tournament, officially withdraws from the September tournament. His likely demotion to jūryō threatens a unbroken streak dating back to 1883 of wrestlers from Aomori Prefecture appearing in the top division of every banzuke, unless fellow Aomori natives Nishikifuji or Takarafuji are able to do well enough in the September tournament to be promoted to makuuchi.
- 19: His Royal Highness Edward, Duke of Edinburgh, and his wife Duchess Sophie are in attendance at the tournament during the makuuchi division matches.
  Former maegashira Mitoryū retires from professional competition.
- 27: One day after handing yokozuna Hōshōryū his second straight loss, ōzeki Kotozakura withdraws from the September tournament. The medical certificate indicates ligament damange in his right knee, requiring three weeks of recovery time. The withdrawal hands a default win to yokozuna Ōnosato, who enters the final day of the tournament with a one-win lead over Hōshōryū.
- 28: Ōnosato (13–2) defeats fellow yokozuna Hōshōryū (13–2) in a playoff to clinch his first top division championship at sumo's highest rank, his third of 2025 and the fifth in his 2 1/2-year professional career. Coming into the last scheduled match of the tournament down by one win, Hōshōryū leveled himself with Ōnosato at 13 wins with a force out victory. In the first playoff between two yokozuna since Asashōryū and Hakuhō in January 2009, Ōnosato was able to counter Hōshōryū's throwing strategy, winning by crush out. Despite finishing as the runner-up, Hōshōryū's performance was his best as yokozuna since his elevation to the rank earlier this year. 21-year-old Ukrainian Aonishiki finishes with 11 wins for the fourth tournament in a row. He also takes home a special prize for the fourth tournament in a row, receiving his second Technique Prize. Other special prizes go to Takanoshō (12–3), who picks up his fifth Fighting Spirit Prize, and Hakuōhō, who despite securing just an 8-win record takes home the Outstanding Performance Prize, as he notched his second straight kinboshi against Ōnosato during the tournament.
  New jūryō wrestler Asahakuryū takes the championship in sumo's second-highest division with 13 wins.
- 30: The Sumo Association announces the retirement of an unnamed tokoyama (hairdresser) belonging to Nishonoseki stable, who had been under investigation by Sumo's compliance committee for financial issues. A severe warning was issued to stablemaster Nishonoseki (the 72nd yokozuna Kisenosato) for lack of supervision.

=== October ===
- 1: The Sumo Association formally announces the retirement of 15 wrestlers, among which is former sekiwake Takarafuji. The 38-year-old spent over 16 years as a professional sumo competitor, with the last 15 years as a sekitori. He finished the recently concluded September tournament with five wins in jūryō, and was in danger of dropping to the next-lowest division. He will remain with Isegahama stable as a coach under the elder name Kiriyama.
  The Sumo Association also announces that four wrestlers will be promoted to the jūryō division, including two for the very first time. One of the new promotions is 22-year-old Goshima, who began his professional career in March of this year as a makushita tsukedashi competitor after high placings in several amateur championships. Starting from the next tournament he will take the new shikona Fujiryōga (藤凌駕). The other new promotion is 21-year-old Nagamura, who will take on the new shikona Himukamaru (日向丸). The native of Miyazaki Prefecture has competed in sumo for just under three years, with one lower-division title. Two others, former maegashira Kitanowaka and former jūryō Wakanoshō, return to sekitori status following injury-related demotions earlier this year.
- 2: The Sumo Association announces the promotions of supporting personnel, including yobidashi (ushers), gyōji (referees) and tokoyama (hairdressers). Among the yobidashi, Katsuyuki and Shirō are promoted to the top positions of tate-yobidashi and fuku-tate-yobidashi, respectively. The promotions will take effect on 22 December, the date of the release of the January 2026 banzuke.
- 4: The retirement ceremony for former ōzeki Takakeishō is held at the Ryōgoku Kokugikan.
- 5: The retirement ceremony for former sekiwake Myōgiryū is held at the Ryōgoku Kokugikan.
- 6: Hōshōryū wins the All Japan Rikishi Championship after defeating Ōnosato, a charity tournament organized by Meiji Shrine, winning the tournament for the first time in three years.
- 7: The JSA is commemorating the centenary of its founding by organizing a special four-hour tournament at the Ryōgoku Kokugikan. Named "Centennial Tournament — Ancient and Modern Sumo", the event is held as a tribute to sumo tournaments of the Heian period, with all participants wearing costumes from that era. It marked the first time in 30 years that the association had organized a tournament paying tribute to sumo wrestling from ancient times. Among the tournament's unique features are specific characteristics rarely seen in professional sumo. Kami-sumo (ja:神相撲; lit. 'god wrestling') matches are held, with their ending traditionally stopping as a draw. A special goningakari demonstration match is also held with yokozuna Hōshōryū wrestling against five other lower-ranked wrestlers (Gōnoyama, Hiradoumi, Ura, Rōga, Meisei). Wrestlers are introduced following the gozengakari ceremony, usually reserved for tournaments attended by the emperor or crown prince. Finally, a sandangamae performed by the two yokozuna (Ōnosato and Hōshōryū) is held, a first since 2017 where the ceremony was performed by Hakuhō and Kisenosato. As a sporting entertainment, a tournament was held between teams formed according to ichimon (Dewanoumi A and B, Isegahama, Tokitsukaze A and B, Nishonoseki A and B, and Takasago), with the Dewanoumi A team emerging victorious. The event also features traditional dances from the gagaku repertoire, including an enbu (spear dance) and bugaku (courtly dance), the latter concluding the event.
- 15: A five-day tournament sanctioned by the Sumo Association begins at Royal Albert Hall in London. Yokozuna Ōnosato and Hōshōryū are among the winners on the first day, along with Ukrainian komusubi Aonishiki. It is the first time since 1991 that a professional sumo tour has taken place in London. Since then, attempts by the Sumo Association to return to London were cancelled twice: in 2009 during the global financial crisis, and in 2021 because of the COVID-19 pandemic.
- 19: The London sumo tournament is won by Hōshōryū, who beats fellow yokozuna Ōnosato by rear push out in the final match to finish with a perfect 5-win record. Special prizes, usually awarded at the end of a 15-day grand sumo tournament, are awarded at the end of this competition: Takayasu wins the Fighting Spirit prize, Tobizaru wins the Outstanding Performance prize, and Ura wins the Technique prize. Additionally, Ura wins a special award as the audience favourite by way of an online vote held over the five days of the tournament.
- 26: 41-year-old coach Kitajin (former maegashira Tenkaihō) retires and leave the Japan Sumo Association. His retirement is announced the next day.
- 27: The banzuke for the final grand sumo tournament of the year is officially released. Aonishiki–who scored 11 wins and received a special prize in all four of his tournaments in the top division this year–is promoted to the rank of sekiwake. Having reached the rank in 13 tournaments, this is the fastest promotion to the sekiwake rank in sumo history (excluding tsukedashi competitors such as Ōnosato), surpassing the previous record of 14 tournaments achieved by former ōzeki Konishiki. Joining Aonishiki at sekiwake is Ōhō, who returns to that rank for the first time since March of this year. Takanoshō is promoted to komusubi, returning to san'yaku for the first time in over three years, while former ōzeki Takayasu retains his komusubi rank despite finishing the previous tournament with seven wins. 24-year-old Kusano is listed on the banzuke at a personal best of maegshira 5 under the new ring name of Yoshinofuji. One wrestler is promoted from jūryō to the top division for the very first time: 24-year-old Ōshōumi, a professional sumo competitor of over five years with two lower-division championships. He had a nine-win performance in September at the top of sumo's second-highest division. Chiyoshōma returns to the top division after he was demoted in the last tournament. Nishikifuji is promoted again to the top division after three tournaments. With the relegation of Takerufuji to jūryō due to injury, Nishikifuji's promotion maintains a 142-year record of wrestlers from Aomori Prefecture ranked in sumo's top division.

=== November ===
- 1: The Sumo Association announces the retirement from competition of former komusubi and two-time top division runner-up Endō. The 35-year-old had been forced to sit out of the last two tournaments due to injury, eventually falling out of sekitori status on the November banzuke. Endō officially assumes the elder name Kitajin, which had most recently been borrowed by Tenkaihō until his departure from the Sumo Association a week earlier.
- 8: Former sekiwake Meisei withdraws from the November tournament from the first day. His medical certificate with the Sumo Association indicates that he underwent surgery the previous month for a disc herniation, and will need one month of rehabilitation. Stablemaster Tatsunami says that there's a chance Meisei could participate midway through the tournament. During the second week of the tournament, it was reported that Meisei would be participating.
- 23: Sekiwake Aonishiki (12–3) becomes the first Ukrainian to take home the Emperor's Cup with his playoff victory at the November 2025 tournament. One day earlier, Aonishiki secured his 11th win of the meet with his third straight victory over yokozuna Hōshōryū. He sat in a three-way tie for the lead with both Hōshōryū and yokozuna Ōnosato, with the Sumo Association's Judging Department already scheduling an emergency meeting to discuss whether Aonishiki should be recommended for promotion to ōzeki. Day 15 begins with the surprise injury withdrawal of Ōnosato (11–4) due to a dislocated shoulder, which allows Hōshōryū (12–3) to win their scheduled contest by default. Aonishiki ensures a playoff against Hōshōryū by defeating ōzeki Kotozakura (8–7) with the winning technique of uchimuso (inner thigh propping twist down). In the deciding match, Aonishiki wins by okurinage (rear throw down) to remain undefeated versus Hōshōryū in four career contests. Aonishiki becomes the second-fastest to reach their maiden victory in the top division, doing so in 14 tournaments. At 21 years and 8 months of age, he is the fourth youngest to win the makuuchi title in modern sumo history, while Ukraine becomes the seventh country in history to have produced a sumo champion in the top division. At the end of the tournament, it was announced that Aonishiki's performance of 34 wins over three tournaments–the last two at san'yaku ranks–was good enough for the Judging Department to recommend Aonishiki's promotion to ōzeki, which will be discussed at a Sumo Association meeting on 26 November. Aonishiki took home his first Outstanding Performance prize and his third Technique prize, tying Ōnosato by collecting a special prize in each of his first five tournaments in the top division. Former ōzeki Kirishima, seeking to return to san'yaku status after having just been demoted, finishes with 11 wins and his third Fighting Spirit prize. Another former ōzeki, Takayasu, will hold on to his san'yaku ranking following his eighth tournament victory. Yoshinofuji, who lost to Takayasu on Day 15, finishes with nine wins. The former Kusano also collected his first career gold star during the tournament, and wins his second Technique Prize. The last of the special prizes goes to Ichiyamamoto (11–4), who collects his second Fighting Spirit prize. Despite pulling out on the last day, yokozuna Ōnosato finishes 2025 with 71 victories, the most in the top division, along with two playoff wins.
  New jūryō competitor Fujiryōga takes home the championship in sumo's second-highest division with a 13–2 record.
- 26: The Sumo Association unanimously approves Aonishiki's promotion to the rank of ōzeki. In his customary acceptance speech, Aonishiki says that he will strive to live up to his new rank and "aim even higher."
  Three promotions to jūryō are announced. Moving up to sumo's second-highest division for the first time is 24-year-old Kazuma, a Nihon University graduate who won several amateur sumo titles and took home three professional championships in the lower divisions since returning from injury in May of this year. The other first-time promotion is 24-year-old Mongolian Dewanoryū, a six-year veteran with one championship in jonidan early in his career. 25-year-old Mongolian Kyokukaiyū returns to jūryō after having just been demoted.
- 27: The Sumo Association approves the transfer of Tokiwayama stable from former komusubi Takamisugi, who will turn the mandatory retirement age of 65 in March of next year, to Minatogawa (former ōzeki Takakeishō). The stable name will change to Minatogawa stable on the transfer date of 26 January 2026.

=== December ===
- 22: The Sumo Association publishes the banzuke for the first grand sumo tournament of 2026, to be held next month in Tokyo. The tournament sees new ōzeki Aonishiki listed alongside Kotozakura, marking the first time since Ōnosato's yokozuna promotion at the end of May that two wrestlers are at sumo's second-highest rank. Former ōzeki Kirishima jumps from maegashira 2 to sekiwake after an 11-win performance in November, marking his return to that rank after having just been demoted from it. Joining him at sekiwake is another former ōzeki, 35-year-old veteran Takayasu, who returns to sumo's third-highest rank for the first time in three years. Wakamotoharu returns to the san'yaku ranks for the first time since last January, ranked at komusubi. The other komusubi competitor is Ōhō, who drops from sekiwake. Ichiyamamoto and Yoshinofuji each secure personal bests with their promotions to the top of the maegashira division. Former ōzeki Asanoyama returns to the top division for the first time since July 2024. He becomes the first wrestler in history to drop from the top division to the third lowest sandanme division, and then return to the top division, on two separate occasions. There are also two new promotions to the top division: The first is 26-year-old Mongolian Asahakuryū, who notched back-to-back lower-division championships in 2025. The other is 26-year-old Hatsuyama, a tsukedashi entrant from March 2022 with one lower-division title. Also of note in the rankings as a whole is the change in shikona (ring name) for nine wrestlers at Isegahama stable, who adopt the stable's traditional suffix of fuji (富士). Eight of those are formerly associated with Miyagino stable, including the maegashira-ranked Hakuōhō, who now goes by the name of Hakunofuji (伯乃富士).
- 25: The Sumo Association announces disciplinary action against stablemaster Kise (former maegashira Higonoumi), demoting him in sumo's hierarchy over an incident in which a Kise stable wrestler in the lower divisions punched a fellow wrestler while they were in Kyushu for the November 2025 tournament. The Sumo Association accepted the retirement of the attacking wrestler, adding that they would have imposed a two-tournament suspension had he stayed, while Kise was cited for violation of supervisory duties.

The winter jungyō (regional tours) will be held at the following locations:

- 30 November: Isahaya, Nagasaki
- 1: Sasebo
- 2: Itoshima, Fukuoka
- 3: Yukuhashi, Fukuoka
- 4: Miyazaki
- 5: Ōita
- 6: Kikuyō, Kumamoto
- 7: Kurume
- 8: Minamiaso, Kumamoto
- 9: Shimonoseki
- 10: Hiroshima
- 11: Kakogawa, Hyōgo
- 12: Amagasaki
- 13: Takamatsu
- 14: Higashiōsaka
- 15: Uda, Nara
- 16: Fukuchiyama, Kyoto
- 17: Suzuka, Mie
- 18: Iwata, Shizuoka
- 19: Odawara
- 20: Machida, Tokyo
- 21: Niiza, Saitama

== Deaths ==
- 27 January: Former jūryō Kuniazuma, aged 49, of a heart attack.
- 3 April: Former maegashira Makimoto (former Todoroki), aged 83.
- 14 April: Jonidan 72 Wakatozakura, aged 33, of flesh-eating disease.
- 29 May: Special class tokoyama Tokoasa, aged 62, of hemopericardial hematoma.
- 6 June: Former maegashira Hattori, aged 64, of liver cancer.
- 15 June: Former ōzeki Masuiyama II, aged 76, of liver failure.
- 10 August: Former sekiwake Kotofuji, aged 60, following a cerebral infarction.
- 11 August: Former maegashira Yōtsukasa, aged 51, following a long period of illness.
- 15 December: Former maegashira Komafudō, aged 60, of heart failure.
- 17 December: Makiko Uchidate, first female member of the Yokozuna Deliberation Council, aged 77.

== See also ==
- Glossary of sumo terms
- List of active sumo wrestlers
- List of years in sumo
