= Tokihayate Hideki =

Japanese sumo wrestler

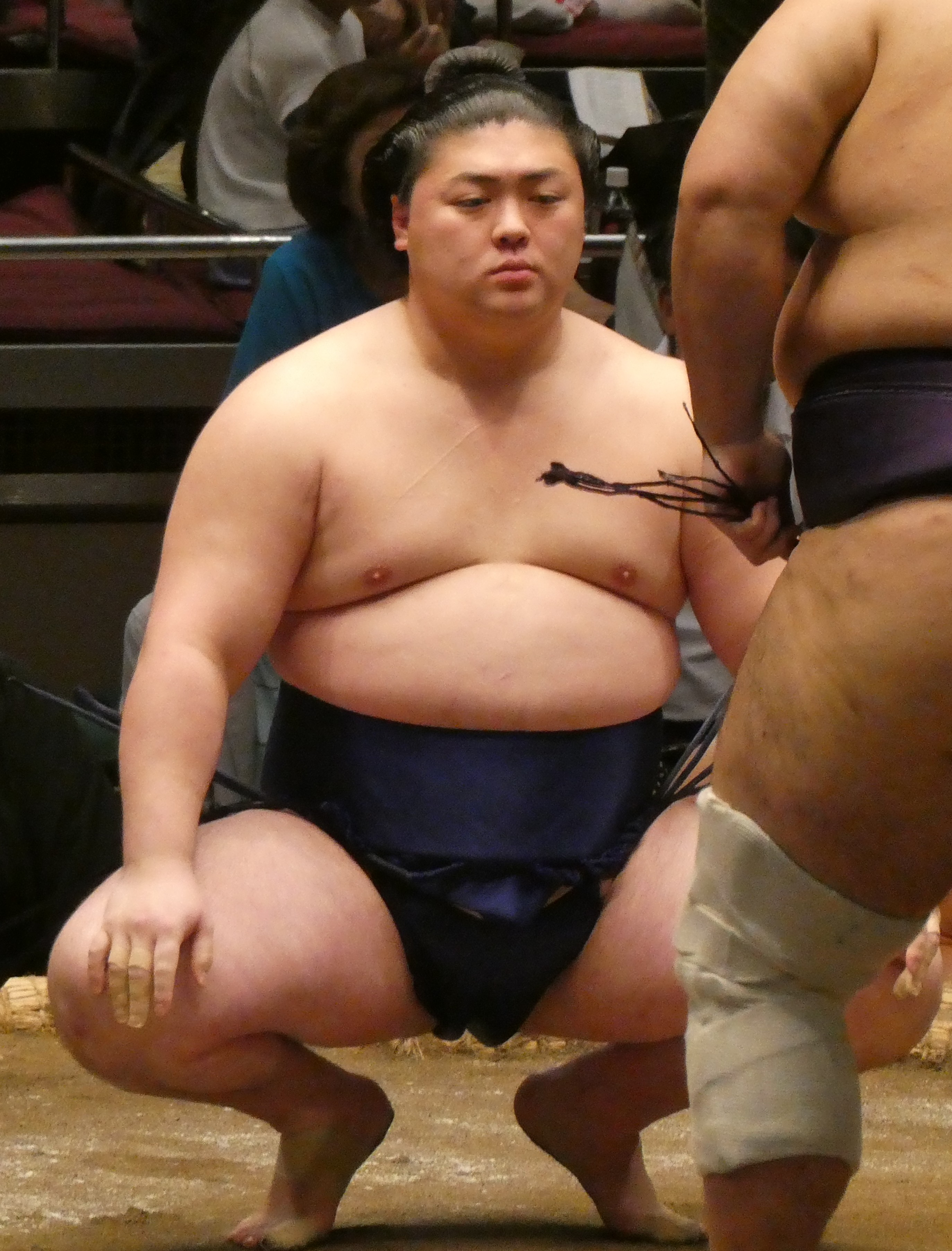
- Tokihayate in September 2024

Personal information
- Native name: 時疾風 秀喜
- Born: Hideki Tomie; August 25, 1996 (age 30) Kurihara, Miyagi Prefecture, Japan
- Height: 1.79 m (5 ft 10 1/2 in)
- Weight: 136 kg (300 lb; 21.4 st)

Sport
- Sport: Sumo
- Rank: see below
- University team: Tokyo University of Agriculture
- Heya: Tokitsukaze
- Debut: March 2019
- Highest rank: Maegashira 9 (March 2026)
- Championships: Makushita; Jonidan
- Updated on February 24, 2026

Tokihayate Hideki (Japanese: 時疾風 秀喜; born August 25, 1996, as Hideki Tomie (冨栄 秀喜, Tomie Hideki)) is a Japanese professional sumo wrestler from Kurihara, Miyagi. His highest rank is maegashira 9.

== Early life ==
Tomie was oriented towards sumo in his second year of elementary school because he was taller than most of his classmates. During these years, however, he continued to play other sports such as volleyball and football, which he eventually gave up when he entered junior high school to devote himself to sumo. In primary school and until he left secondary school, he was also a member of a calligraphy club, a hobby he still practises today. At senior school, he attended Kogota Agriculture and Forestry High School in Kogota, Miyagi. During this period he participated in numerous training camps with other current makuuchi wrestlers such as Nishikifuji or Ōnoshō, both also from the Tōhoku region. In his third year, he finished third in the national inter-high school tournament.

Upon graduation, he entered Tokyo University of Agriculture, which has a renowned sumo club that has already produced top division wrestlers such as Yutakayama and Shōdai. He wanted to become a teacher, but changed his career plans after qualifying as one of the top 16 amateur sumo wrestlers at the All Japan Sumo Championships. He was briefly an instructor in technology and science at a middle school, then in science and agriculture at a high school. Midorifuji and Nishikifuji, who also took part in the event, gave up their studies at Kindai University to become professionals, which Tomie later described as the moment when he seriously considered becoming a professional himself. In his fourth year, he finished third in Towada's National Invitational Tournament. After failing to qualify for the All-Japan Championships (the last tournament he could have entered as a student), Tomie decided to become a professional wrestler. Tokihayate's hometown was the victim of the 2011 Tōhoku earthquake and tsunami, a vivid memory for him that also prompted him to become a wrestler to provide future entertainment for disaster-stricken residents.

== Career ==
=== Early career ===
He joined Tokitsukaze stable where two alumni of Tokyo University of Agriculture (Yutakayama and Shōdai) were already wrestling. He was given the shikona, or ring name, Tokisakae (時栄), which is a name composed of a kanji from the name of his stable (時) and a kanji from his real name (栄). He shared the same introductory ceremony as Kitanowaka.

Then in jonokuchi, he lost his second match with a defeat to Kitanowaka, which eliminated Tokisakae from the title race although he also finished with a score of 6–1. In jonidan, Tokisakae won all his matches and went on to win the championship, defeating Kitanowaka on Day 7 and beating former makuuchi-ranked wrestler Homarefuji on the final day. Tokisakae stagnated in makushita for three years. In March 2021, however, he was promoted to makushita 15, a position usually allowing promotion to the jūryō division in the event of a championship win. Despite winning 6 in a row, Tokisakae was beaten on the final day by then-former komusubi Abi, who was making his comeback after a three-tournament suspension. In September 2021, he withdrew from competition after suffering a muscle tear in his left thigh. In 2022, he changed his shikona to Tokihayate (時疾風), keeping the reference to his stable but incorporating the kanji for speed (疾) and wind (風) to symbolise his desire for a lively style.

In 2023, he secured promotion to the jūryō division with a narrow kachi-koshi score. His promotion makes Tokihayate the first new sekitori from Miyagi Prefecture in 28 years, since the first promotion of Gojōrō in July 1995, and the first sekitori in the prefecture since Gojōrō lost that status for the July 2005 tournament. Tokihayate immediately lost his sekitori status, however, recording a 6–9 score in his first jūryō tournament. In his next tournament, he bounced back and won the makushita division championship with a perfect score, notably beating upper-division wrestler Chiyonoumi on Day 1 and Ōnosato on Day 5. At the January 2024 tournament, Tokihayate recorded his best score since his debut as a sekitori with a run of seven consecutive wins from the first day of the tournament, and by earning a tenth victory, beating Tōhakuryū on Day 14; placing him in a position for potential promotion to makuuchi for the May tournament. The promotion did not happen, however, and Tokihayate competed at the highest rank in the jūryō division for the March tournament, achieving his then-highest rank. On the final day of the same tournament, he scored an eighth victory (kachi-koshi) over Shirokuma, acquiring the virtual certainty of promotion to makuuchi.

=== Makuuchi promotion ===
When the banzuke for the May tournament was announced, it was confirmed that Tokihayate had been promoted to professional sumo's highest division (makuuchi). This promotion makes him the first wrestler from Miyagi Prefecture to be newly promoted to this level since Gojōrō in 1997.

== Fighting style ==
Both Tokihayate's profile on the official website of the Japanese Sumo Association and him defines his favourite hold as hidari-yotsu, a right hand outside, left hand inside grip on his opponent's mawashi. He cites throwing techniques such as uwatenage or uwatedashinage as his favourites. The wrestlers who inspires him most in his sumo style are Endō and Meisei, because they also use their left arms a lot.

He himself says that he has a bad habit of rushing into his matches in order to get quick wins, which leads him to lose when he tries to initiate throwing moves. At 1.79 m (5 ft 10 1/2 in), Tokihayate is not a wrestler who can rely on his size to gain the upper hand in his matches, a weakness he makes up for with good athleticism.

== Personal life ==
At the time of his promotion to makuuchi, Tokihayate revealed that he was married to an auxiliary nurse from Nagasaki, a year younger than himself, after a three-year relationship.

== Career record ==
Tokihayate Hideki
Year	January Hatsu basho, Tokyo	March Haru basho, Osaka	May Natsu basho, Tokyo	July Nagoya basho, Nagoya	September Aki basho, Tokyo	November Kyūshū basho, Fukuoka
2019	x	(Maezumō)	East Jonokuchi #15; 6–1	West Jonidan #44; 7–0; Champion	East Sandanme #44; 6–1	East Makushita #56; 5–2
2020	West Makushita #39; 5–2	East Makushita #24; 4–3	West Makushita #17; Tournament Cancelled; State of Emergency; 0–0–0	West Makushita #17; 5–2	East Makushita #7; 2–5	West Makushita #23; 4–3
2021	West Makushita #18; 4–3	East Makushita #15; 6–1	East Makushita #4; 3–4	East Makushita #6; 3–4	East Makushita #10; 0–4–3	East Makushita #45; 5–2
2022	East Makushita #30; 3–4	West Makushita #41; 4–3	West Makushita #31; 5–2	East Makushita #20; 6–1	West Makushita #7; 5–2	East Makushita #3; 3–4
2023	West Makushita #6; 5–2	East Makushita #3; 4–3	East Jūryō #14; 6–9	East Makushita #1; 7–0; Champion	West Jūryō #11; 8–7	West Jūryō #8; 8–7
2024	East Jūryō #6; 10–5	East Jūryō #1; 8–7	East Maegashira #15; 6–9	East Jūryō #1; 7–8	East Jūryō #2; 9–6	West Maegashira #15; 6–9
2025	West Maegashira #17; 7–8	East Maegashira #18; 10–5	East Maegashira #13; 8–7	West Maegashira #11; 6–9	West Maegashira #13; 7–8	West Maegashira #14; 9–6
2026	East Maegashira #10; 8–7	East Maegashira #9; 5–10	West Maegashira #12; 4–11	East Jūryō #2; 10–5	West Maegashira #15; 8–7	East Maegashira #14; 5–10
Record given as wins–losses–absences Top division champion Top division runner-up Retired Non-participation Jūryō Lower divisions Sanshō key: F=Fighting spirit; O=Outstanding performance; T=Technique Also shown: ★=Kinboshi; P=Playoff(s); Divisions: Makuuchi — Jūryō — Makushita — Sandanme — Jonidan — Jonokuchi Makuuchi ranks: Yokozuna — Ōzeki — Sekiwake — Komusubi — Maegashira

== See also ==
- Glossary of sumo terms
- List of active sumo wrestlers
