= Kinbōzan Haruki =

Professional sumo wrestler

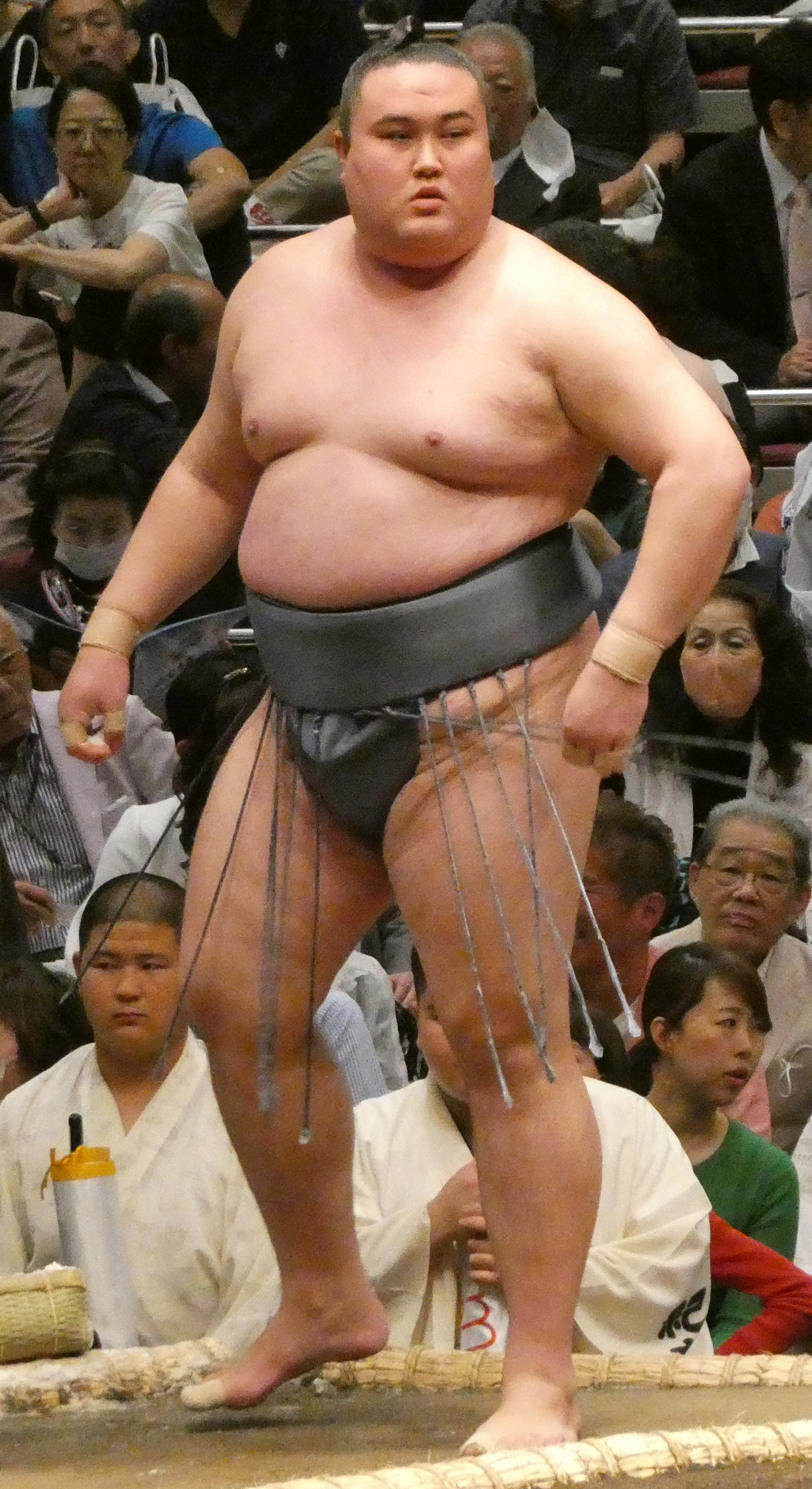
- Kinbōzan in May 2023

Personal information
- Native name: 金峰山 晴樹
- Born: Yersin Baltagul; June 24, 1997 (age 29) Almaty, Kazakhstan
- Height: 1.94 m (6 ft 4 1/2 in)
- Weight: 181 kg (399 lb; 28.5 st)

Sport
- Sport: Sumo
- Rank: see below
- Heya: Kise stable
- Debut: November 2021
- Highest rank: Maegashira 3 (July 2025)
- Championships: 1 Juryo; 1 Sandanme; 1 Makushita
- Special Prizes: Fighting Spirit (3)
- Updated on November 22, 2026

Kinbōzan Haruki (Japanese: 金峰山 晴樹; born 24 June 1997 as Yersin Baltagul (Kazakh: Ерсін Балтағұл)) is a Kazakh professional sumo wrestler from Almaty. He began his professional sumo career in November 2021 at the age of 24.

After eight tournaments and two lower division championships, he was promoted to the top makuuchi division, becoming the first Kazakh to do so. His highest rank to date has been maegashira 3 as of the July 2025 tournament. He wrestles for Kise stable.

== Early life and education ==
Yersin originally practiced judo and Kazakh wrestling until the age of 18 when, at the suggestion of former yokozuna Asashōryū, he transferred to a high school in Japan to participate in amateur sumo wrestling. He then entered Nihon University and joined their sumo club. In 2019, he finished as the runner-up in the All-Japan Championships, and placed in the top 16 at that same tournament the following year.

== Career ==
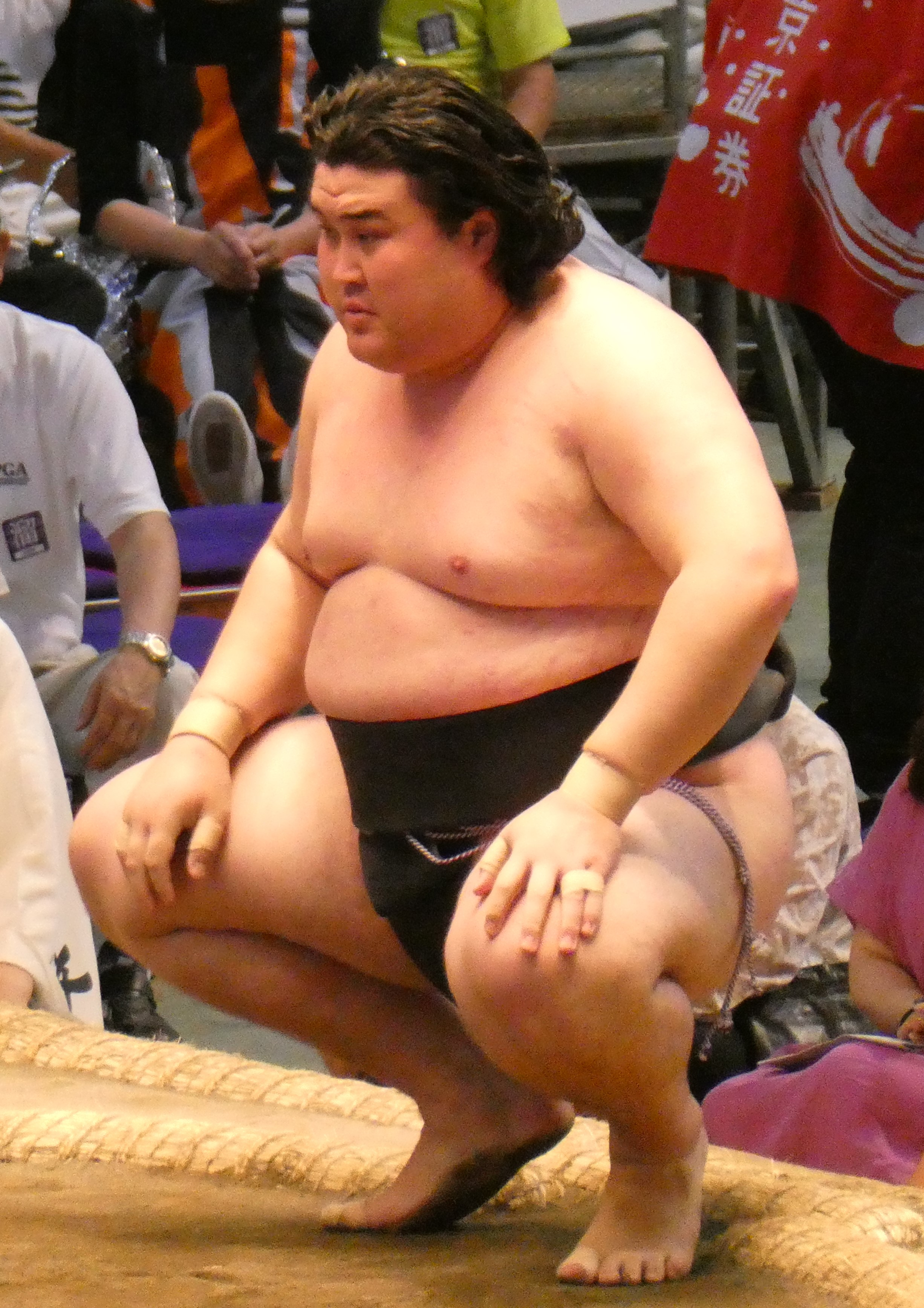
Kinbōzan in July 2022

Upon graduating from university, Yersin was urged to enter professional sumo, where he would be eligible to skip the lower two divisions and start at the rank of sandanme because of a dispensation given to amateur wrestlers who have finished in the top 8 in tournaments such as the All-Japan Championships. He joined Kise stable under the shikona of Kinbōzan, which is derived from Mount Kinbō in Kumamoto, the hometown of his stablemaster (former maegashira Higonoumi) but also to be inspired by the martial spirit of Miyamoto Musashi, who wrote parts of his Book of Five Rings while staying on the mountain.

Kinbōzan's first tournament was the November 2021 basho in Kyushu, where he won all seven of his matches and took the sandanme championship, resulting in his promotion to makushita. At the March 2022 tournament in Osaka, he won the makushita championship with a 7–0 sweep at the rank of makushita 34. He would work his way up the makushita rankings and eventually earn promotion to the second-highest professional division, jūryō, in September 2022. Following winning performances in three tournaments (including double digit wins in two of them), he was promoted to the top makuuchi division in March 2023, becoming the first wrestler from Kazakhstan to do so. At a press conference following his top division promotion, Kinbōzan said that he wanted to wrestle his own style of sumo, adding he was motivated to become stronger following a recent visit to Kazakhstan to visit his mother, who was unwell. In his top-division debut he secured 11 wins and was awarded with the kantō-shō (Fighting Spirit prize), which is one of the special prizes awarded at the end of every tournament.

During the sōken of May 2023, Kinbōzan admitted that he was prone to breathing problems when put under stress or too much effort after he appeared to be genuinely uncomfortable after a butsukari session with more senior wrestlers. In the following tournament, Kinbōzan notably won his match against ōzeki Takakeishō, handing him his fourth defeat on Day 10. This victory marked the first time in seven years that a maegashira ranked wrestler without a fully grown ōichōmage inflicted a defeat on an ōzeki. The most recent previous occurrence of such a victory had been in July 2016 when Mitakeumi earned a victory over then-ōzeki Terunofuji. Kinbōzan nevertheless finished the tournament with a score of 4–11. After two successive tournaments, in which he recorded a negative score (make-koshi), Kinbōzan also withdrew from the jungyō of August, reporting a sprained cervical vertebra requiring 30 days of rest, an injury which he had already contracted at the May tournament and which really limited his capabilities.

Kinbōzan remained in the makuuchi division throughout 2023, however, and started 2024 at the rank of maegashira 6 east. During the twelfth day of the tournament, he suffered a knee injury in his match against Tsurugishō and had to limp back up the hanamichi, telling the press afterwards that he felt severe pain even with painkillers. On the fourth day of the March 2024 tournament, Kinbōzan fell hard outside the ring in his loss to Tamawashi. He withdrew the following day, with the medical certificate stating he would need seven days of rest due to a cervical vertebra sprain. After three days of rest, he returned to competition. In the next two tournaments, Kinbōzan conceded 22 defeats, subsequently resulting in his demotion from the top division to jūryō. At the November tournament, however, he won his third professional title, taking the jūryō championship with 13 wins. The November performance put him back at the top division in January 2025 as West Maegashira #14.

At the January 2025 tournament, Kinbōzan stood out, winning nine consecutive matches from the first day of the tournament to set a personal record, also establishing himself as the only wrestler in the tournament to remain unbeaten halfway point of the competition. On Day 10, however, he suffered his first defeat at the hands of komusubi Abi, reducing to one victory the two-victory gap he had spared against the trio of wrestlers still in positions to challenge him for the title (Ōhō, Takerufuji and Chiyoshōma). He however maintained an outright one-win lead after 13 days, having defeated two ōzeki opponents in Ōnosato and Kotozakura. On Day 12, he lost his match to ōzeki Hōshōryū, the nephew of Asashōryū, the man who introduced him to sumo, allowing the ōzeki to make a stronger bid for the title. Before the match, the former Asashōryū, who closely follows Kinbōzan's performance, allegedly called stablemaster Kise (the former Higonoumi) to encourage the wrestler, going so far as to say that Kinbōzan shouldn't lose to "this jerk" (あのヤロウ, anoyarō), referring to Hōshōryū. On the final day, Kinbōzan faced Ōhō, the latter (along with Hōshōryū) being one of two wrestlers only one defeat behind the tournament leader. Kinbōzan lost the match, forcing at the very least a playoff between the two wrestlers. Later, Hōshōryū also qualified for the title after defeating Kotozakura, with the playoff becoming a three-way fight. Kinbōzan lost the title to Hōshōryū, who previously defeated Ōhō. For leading the competition, Kinbōzan nonetheless received his second sanshō for Fighting Spirit, however missing out on the award for Outstanding Performance after losing to Ōhō in regulation.

In September 2026, it was revealed that Kinbōzan had received the Order of the Leopard in February of that year for his work as a top division wrestler.

During the November 2026 tournament, Kinbōzan established himself as one of the frontrunners in the competition during the first half of the tournament. Although he subsequently fell out of contention for the title, Kinbōzan was named a potential recipient for a Fighting Spirit prize if he won his eleventh match. Kinbōzan defeated Asanoyama and won the prize.

== Fighting style ==
Kinbōzan primarily uses pushing and thrusting techniques, with most of his wins by way of oshidashi (frontal push out), yorikiri (frontal force out) and tsukidashi (frontal thrust out).

== Personal life ==
Kinbōzan is a Muslim and therefore abstains from pork and alcohol. He is the second Muslim sumo wrestler since Ōsunaarashi from Egypt.

== Career record ==
Kinbōzan Haruki
Year	January Hatsu basho, Tokyo	March Haru basho, Osaka	May Natsu basho, Tokyo	July Nagoya basho, Nagoya	September Aki basho, Tokyo	November Kyūshū basho, Fukuoka
2021	x	x	x	x	x	Sandanme tsukedashi #100; 7–0; Champion
2022	West Makushita #59; 5–2	West Makushita #34; 7–0; Champion	West Makushita #4; 5–2	West Makushita #1; 6–1	West Jūryō #12; 10–5	West Jūryō #7; 8–7
2023	East Jūryō #5; 11–4	East Maegashira #14; 11–4; F	East Maegashira #5; 4–11	East Maegashira #10; 7–8	East Maegashira #10; 9–6	West Maegashira #7; 8–7
2024	East Maegashira #6; 7–8	East Maegashira #7; 6–7–2	West Maegashira #10; 8–7	West Maegashira #8; 4–11	West Maegashira #12; 4–11	West Jūryō #1; 12–3; Champion
2025	West Maegashira #14; 12–3–P; F	West Maegashira #5; 6–9	West Maegashira #8; 10–5	West Maegashira #3; 4–11	West Maegashira #8; 7–8	West Maegashira #8; 7–8
2026	West Maegashira #8; 4–11	West Maegashira #16; 9–6	West Maegashira #11; 6–9	East Maegashira #14; 9–6	West Maegashira #10; 9–6	West Maegashira #7; 11–4; F
Record given as wins–losses–absences Top division champion Top division runner-up Retired Non-participation Jūryō Lower divisions Sanshō key: F=Fighting spirit; O=Outstanding performance; T=Technique Also shown: ★=Kinboshi; P=Playoff(s); Divisions: Makuuchi — Jūryō — Makushita — Sandanme — Jonidan — Jonokuchi Makuuchi ranks: Yokozuna — Ōzeki — Sekiwake — Komusubi — Maegashira

== See also ==
- Glossary of sumo terms
- List of active sumo wrestlers
- List of non-Japanese sumo wrestlers
- List of active gold star earners
- List of active special prize winners
- List of sumo top division runners-up
