= Shirokuma Yūta =

Japanese sumo wrestler (born 1999)

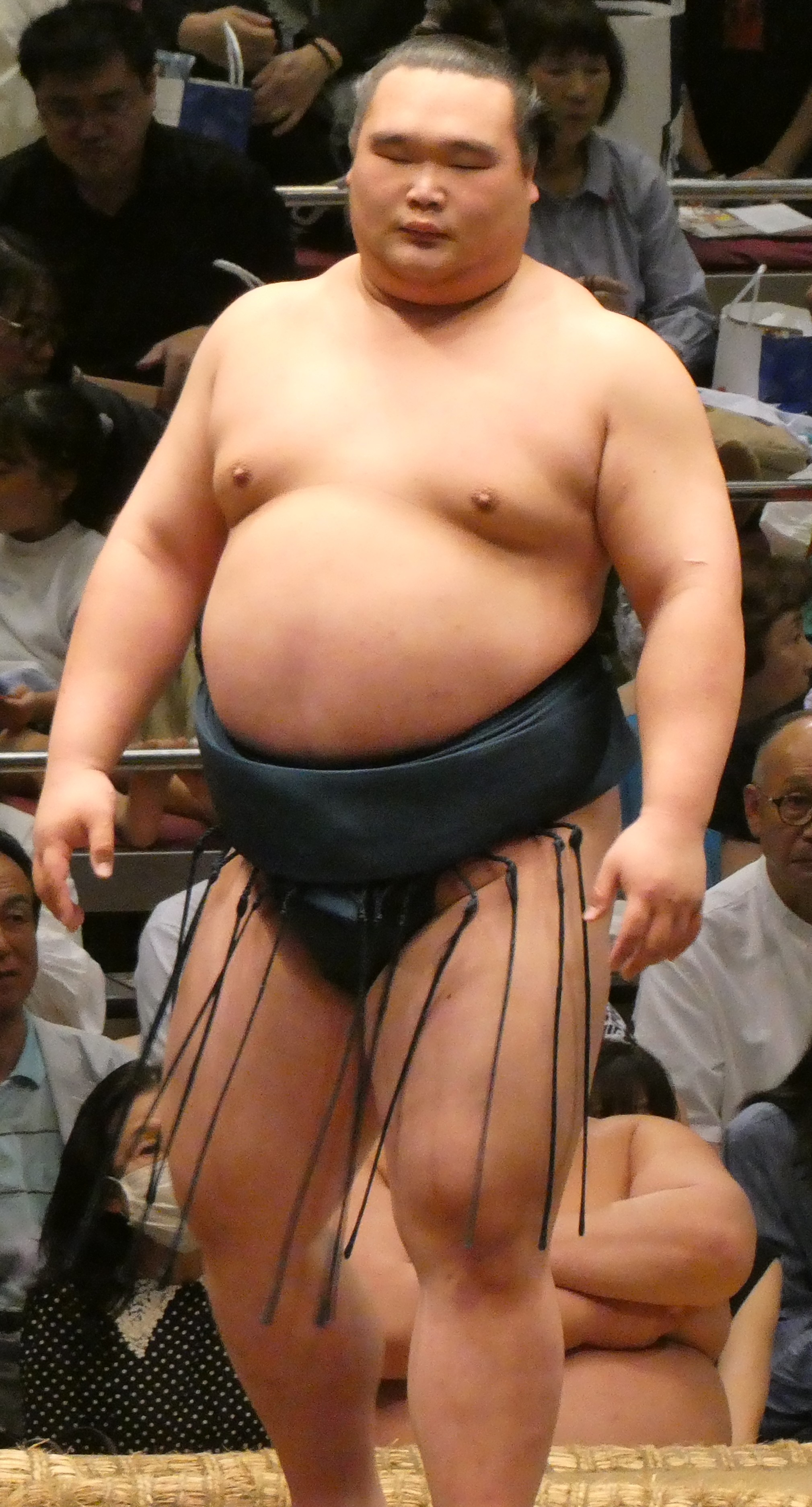
- Shirokuma in September 2024

Personal information
- Native name: 白熊 優太
- Born: Yūta Takahashi; May 25, 1999 (age 27) Sukagawa, Fukushima Prefecture, Japan
- Height: 1.86 m (6 ft 1 in)
- Weight: 167 kg (368 lb; 26.3 st)

Sport
- Sport: Sumo
- Rank: see below
- University team: Nippon Sport Science University
- Heya: Nishonoseki
- Debut: May 2022
- Highest rank: Maegashira 16 (September 2024)
- Championships: 1 (Jūryō); 1 (Jonidan); 1 (Jonokuchi)
- Updated on 28 April 2025

Shirokuma Yūta (Japanese: 白熊 優太; born 25 May 1999 as Yūta Takahashi (高橋 優太, Takahashi Yūta)) is a Japanese professional sumo wrestler from Sukagawa, Fukushima Prefecture. After a successful amateur career, he joined Nishonoseki stable and began his professional career in May 2022. His highest rank has been maegashira 16.

== Early life and sumo background ==
Takahashi began sumo at the age of 4 at the recommendation of his grandfather. He attended a local sumo dōjō in Fukushima prefecture, and at the age of 12 he left for Niigata prefecture to wrestle for more respectable programs. After graduating high school he enrolled in the Department of Martial Arts at Nippon Sport Science University, where he served as the captain of the school's sumo club during his fourth year. Following university graduation he joined Nishonoseki stable (run by the 72nd yokozuna Kisenosato), thus fulfilling his grandfather's wish of him going professional.

== Career ==
=== Early career ===
Takahashi made his professional debut as a member of Nishonoseki stable in May 2022 along with fellow Nittaidai teammate Kayō. He would take the jonokuchi championship in the July 2022 tournament after a playoff against Kazuto, who handed him his sole loss of the tournament. In September 2022 he won all seven of his matches in the second-lowest jonidan division, winning the yūshō in a playoff. In November he won his first six contests at the rank of sandanme, but missed out on the championship after losing his final match to Hitoshi.

Despite being unable to claim his third straight lower-division championship, Takahashi was promoted to the third-highest makushita division for the January 2023 tournament. In his next four tournaments he tallied a total of 22 wins against just four losses, progressing up to the rank of makushita 4 by July.

=== Jūryō promotion ===
When the rankings for the September 2023 tournament were announced, it was confirmed that Takahashi's 5-win result in July was sufficient to promote him to jūryō, professional sumo's second-highest division. This promotion was acquired at the same time as stablemate and Nittaidai classmate Ōnosato, marking the first promotion of two wrestlers from the same stable to the sekitori ranks in 11 years, as well as the first two from Nishonoseki stable to be raised by Kisenosato alone since he became stablemaster in 2019. At his press conference to mark the jūryō promotion Takahashi said: "There has been difficult times for Fukushima, and now I want to give back to my hometown by rising up the banzuke." This was in reference to his home prefecture, as well as his home town of Sukagawa, which had been damaged by the Great East Japan Earthquake of 2011. Takahashi also mentioned that Sukagawa is the birthplace of Eiji Tsuburaya, and thus has a connection to Ultraman. "I want to be like Ultraman, someone that even young children can look up to and admire," he said.

In his jūryō debut Takahashi won 8 of his 15 matches, securing his kachi-koshi on Day 13 in a match against Ukrainian rikishi Shishi. In the following tournament in November he would again go 8–7, securing his winning record on Day 13 in a match against Yūma.

On 22 December 2023 Nishonoseki stable announced on their X account (formerly Twitter) that Takahashi's shikona, or ring name, would change to Shirokuma for the January 2024 tournament. "Shirokuma" is Japanese for polar bear, and the post indicated that the name was in reference to him being referenced as a muscular competitor with fair skin. The post also said that Takahashi was taught to wrestle like the late Hokuten'yū, whose nickname was the "white bear of the north sea," which influenced his decision to adopt the new name.

Shirokuma withdrew from the March 2024 tournament, complaining of back pain after injuring himself in his match against Kagayaki. However, he did not rule out the possibility of returning to the competition. On the thirteenth day of the tournament, he was placed for the first time of his career in a makuuchi match, against upper-division wrestler Daiamami, losing the match by yorikiri.

Shirokuma took the jūryō division title at the July 2024 tournament for his third professional sumo championship, winning his Day 15 contest to avoid a three-way playoff. The result saw him promoted to the top division for the September tournament.

Shirokuma, then relegated in the jūryō division, withdrew on the first day of the 2026 November tournament due to an injury to the lateral ligament in his right ankle.

== Fighting style ==
Shirokuma has shown a preference for yotsu techniques which involve grasping his opponent's mawashi, or belt. His most common kimarite, or winning moves, are yorikiri force-out wins. His preferred grip is listed as migi-yotsu, or a right arm inside and left hand outside position.

== Personal life ==
Shirokuma maintains a long friendship with Ōnosato, his junior with whom he shared his university and professional years. The two often go to restaurants together during tournaments, and Ōnosato nicknames Shirokuma "polar bear-san".

== Career record ==
Shirokuma Yūta
Year	January Hatsu basho, Tokyo	March Haru basho, Osaka	May Natsu basho, Tokyo	July Nagoya basho, Nagoya	September Aki basho, Tokyo	November Kyūshū basho, Fukuoka
2022	x	x	(Maezumō)	West Jonokuchi #17; 6–1–P; Champion	West Jonidan #44; 7–0–P; Champion	West Sandanme #43; 6–1
2023	West Makushita #54; 5–2	West Makushita #33; 6–1	East Makushita #13; 6–1	West Makushita #4; 5–2	West Jūryō #12; 8–7	East Jūryō #9; 8–7
2024	West Jūryō #6; 8–7	West Jūryō #5; 7–6–2	East Jūryō #6; 6–9	East Jūryō #8; 12–3; Champion	East Maegashira #16; 4–9–2	West Jūryō #3; 7–8
2025	East Jūryō #4; 9–6	West Maegashira #17; 5–10	West Jūryō #3; 6–9	West Jūryō #4; 5–10	East Jūryō #9; 8–7	West Jūryō #7; 9–6
2026	West Jūryō #3; 6–9	West Jūryō #5; 7–8	West Jūryō #8; 7–8	East Jūryō #9; 9–6	West Jūryō #6; 6–9	West Jūryō #9; Sat out due to injury 0–1–14
Record given as wins–losses–absences Top division champion Top division runner-up Retired Non-participation Jūryō Lower divisions Sanshō key: F=Fighting spirit; O=Outstanding performance; T=Technique Also shown: ★=Kinboshi; P=Playoff(s); Divisions: Makuuchi — Jūryō — Makushita — Sandanme — Jonidan — Jonokuchi Makuuchi ranks: Yokozuna — Ōzeki — Sekiwake — Komusubi — Maegashira

== See also ==
- Glossary of sumo terms
- List of active sumo wrestlers
- List of sumo second division champions
