= Hitoshi Hidetada =

Japanese sumo wrestler (born 1997)

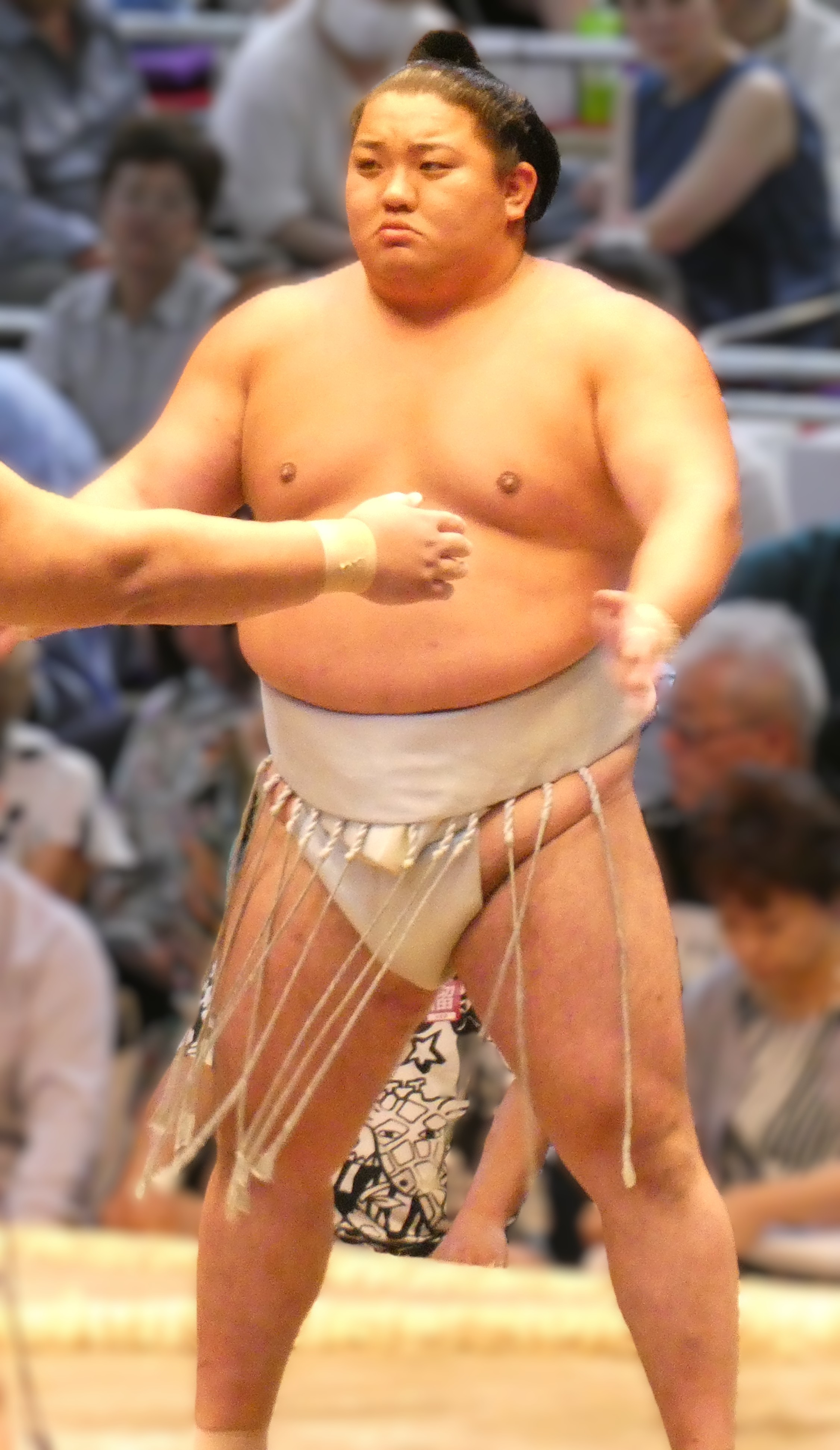
- Hitoshi during the July 2025 tournament.

Personal information
- Native name: 日翔志 英忠
- Born: Hitoshi Sawada; August 14, 1997 (age 29) Tachikawa, Tokyo, Japan
- Height: 1.81 m (5 ft 11 1/2 in)
- Weight: 157 kg (346 lb; 24.7 st)

Sport
- Sport: Sumo
- Rank: see below
- Heya: Oitekaze
- Debut: May 2021
- Highest rank: Maegashira 17 (September 2025)
- Championships: 1 Makushita; 1 Sandanme; 2 Jonidan
- Updated on 1 September 2025

Hitoshi Hidetada (Japanese: 日翔志 英忠; born August 14, 1997 as Hitoshi Sawada (沢田 日登志, Sawada Hitoshi)) is a Japanese professional sumo wrestler from Tachikawa, Tokyo and wrestles for Oitekaze stable.

== Career ==
Hitoshi was born in Musashino, Tokyo and grew up in Tachikawa. His grandfather was a sumo fan, and his older brother began learning sumo. He followed his brother and began training at Tachikawa Renseikan from the age of five. He studied sumo at Nou Junior High School in Itoigawa, Niigata Prefecture, until the second semester of his third year. He placed third individually in the National Junior High School Sumo Championships during his third year. After graduating from junior high, he went on to Saitama Sakae High School, where he won the Inter-High School Athletic Meet and Hirosaki Tournament as a team in his first year, the Selected Tournament as a team in his second year, and the Inter-High School Athletic Meet and Usa Tournament as a team in his third year.

After graduating from high school, he entered Nihon University's College of Sport Sciences, Department of Competitive Sports, where he won the team championship at the Kanazawa Tournament in his third year, and in his fourth year he won the team championships at the Kanazawa Tournament, Towada Tournament, and National Student Championships, as well as the open weight division at the National Student Sumo Individual Weight Class Championships.

After graduating from university, he got a job at Nihon University's business division and coached the Nihon University sumo team while also working as a corporate athlete. However, due to the COVID-19 pandemic, tournaments were canceled, making it difficult for him to practice. After taking a break from sumo and spending more time reflecting on himself, he participated in the All Japan Championships in December 2020, which led him to join the Oitekaze stable. Because it meant giving up the stability of a university employee, he joined despite his father's objections. He later revealed that he thought, "I'm not very smart, and sumo was the only way to get ahead."

The age limit was relaxed for new apprentice examinations, and he made his professional sumo debut at the age of 23 in the May 2021 tournament. He was ranked in the jonokuchi division for the first time in the July tournament, with a record of 5 wins and 2 losses. The following September tournament, he was promoted to the jonidan division and won all 7 matches to become the jonidan champion. He was promoted to sandanme in the following November tournament, but missed three consecutive tournaments after that due to a neck injury he sustained during practice after the September tournament. He was bedridden for about a month (some say two months) immediately after the injury, and was unable to engage in head-first sumo due to the injury.

However, with encouragement from his stablemates and his master's words, "You can definitely make it to the jūryō division," he returned to the ring in the May 2022 tournament. Incidentally, during his absence, his father died suddenly in March that year. In his second tournament after his return, in July 2022, he won all seven of his matches in the jonidan division, achieving his second jonidan championship. However, after his victory bout on the 13th day, his stablemate, makuuchi wrestler Endō, was diagnosed with COVID-19, preventing him from appearing in his victory interview with NHK and participating in the final day's award ceremony. He returned to sandanme in the following September tournament, and in the November tournament, he won all seven of his matches and defeated Kazuto in the deciding match to become sandanme champion.

In the January 2023 tournament, he was promoted to the makushita division, East 18th, and finished with a winning record of 4 wins and 3 losses. The March tournament was his first losing record, excluding a tournament absence due to a neck injury. However, he got a winning record of 5–2 in both the May and July tournaments. He entered the September tournament at his highest rank of west makushita, third, he recorded a 6–1 record, making promotion to the jūryō division a certainty. He won the seven-man championship match on the final day of the tournament to become the makushita champion. Upon winning the makushita championship, he exclaimed with a gleam in his eyes, "I'm glad I didn't quit. Next time, I want to aim for a winning record." On September 27, his promotion to the juryo division for the November tournament was officially announced. At a press conference at Oitekaze stable on the same day, he expressed his joy at his promotion to the jūryō division, about two and a half years after joining the stable, saying, "It took longer than I expected. I'm really glad." He named his high school classmate Kotonowaka as the wrestler he would like to face, enthusiastically saying, "I want to do my best to catch up as soon as possible." He suffered two straight losses on the first day of the November tournament, and on the second day, during his match against Akua, he injured his right leg and left the ring in a wheelchair. There was no abnormality in the bone, so he competed the next day after receiving a painkiller injection. He left the ring dragging his right leg, but he pushed out Takakento, earning his long-awaited first win as a sekitori. However, he suffered a crushing defeat in the tournament with a record of 2 wins and 13 losses, and was demoted to the makushita division.

Throughout 2024, he had three losing records in Tokyo, but all winning records in regional tournaments. In the January 2025 tournament, he lost his first bout as the fourth ranked wrestler in the west makushita division, but then won six matches in a row. At the ranking meeting on the 29th of that month, it was decided that he would be promoted back to jūryō for the following March tournament. In the March tournament, he was ranked 12th in the east jūryō division, posting a winning record of 9 wins and 6 losses, his first time in the jūryō division. In the following May tournament, he was ranked 6th in the east jūryō division, posting a losing record of 7 wins and 8 losses, but in the July tournament, where his ranking remained unchanged, he posted a significant winning record of 10 wins and 5 losses. In the September tournament, he was promoted to the 17th ranked wrestler in the west maegashira division.

In his Makuuchi debut, he started off the tournament with a streak of 4 straight losses, but won the following 4 bouts to reach a record of 4 wins and 4 losses on day 8. Throughout the next 7 days, he managed to earn 3 more wins and ended his tournament with 7 wins and 8 losses, which saw him demoted back into the jūryō division and he was ranked 1st in the east jūryō division for the November Tournament 2025.

During the November 2026 tournament, Hitoshi—who was competing in the jūryō division at the time—suffered a fracture of the left orbital floor on the very first day, forcing him to withdraw from the tournament. However, he returned to competition after three days of rest, on the fifth day. Since the bone remained fractured, surgery was scheduled for an unspecified date.

== Personal life ==
Hitoshi has been married since November 2024 and is the father of a daughter born in 2025

== Career record ==
Hitoshi Hidetada
Year	January Hatsu basho, Tokyo	March Haru basho, Osaka	May Natsu basho, Tokyo	July Nagoya basho, Nagoya	September Aki basho, Tokyo	November Kyūshū basho, Fukuoka
2021	x	x	(Maezumō)	West Jonokuchi #19; 5–2	East Jonidan #63; 7–0; Champion	West Sandanme #63; Sat out due to injury 0–0–7
2022	East Jonidan #24; Sat out due to injury 0–0–7	West Jonidan #94; Sat out due to injury 0–0–7	West Jonokuchi #4; 5–2	East Jonidan #62; 7–0; Champion	East Sandanme #61; 5–2	East Sandanme #28; 7–0; Champion
2023	East Makushita #18; 4–3	East Makushita #14; 3–4	West Makushita #18; 5–2	West Makushita #9; 5–2	West Makushita #3; 6–1–PPP; Champion	East Jūryō #11; 2–13
2024	East Makushita #7; 2–5	East Makushita #21; 5–2	East Makushita #13; 3–4	West Makushita #19; 6–1	East Makushita #6; 3–4	East Makushita #12; 5–2
2025	West Makushita #4; 6–1	East Jūryō #12; 9–6	East Jūryō #6; 7–8	East Jūryō #6; 10–5	West Maegashira #17; 7–8	East Jūryō #1; 2–13
2026	East Jūryō #9; 9–6	East Jūryō #6; 5–10	East Jūryō #12; 8–7	East Jūryō #10; 6–9	West Jūryō #11; 9–6	West Jūryō #7; 5–8–2
Record given as wins–losses–absences Top division champion Top division runner-up Retired Non-participation Jūryō Lower divisions Sanshō key: F=Fighting spirit; O=Outstanding performance; T=Technique Also shown: ★=Kinboshi; P=Playoff(s); Divisions: Makuuchi — Jūryō — Makushita — Sandanme — Jonidan — Jonokuchi Makuuchi ranks: Yokozuna — Ōzeki — Sekiwake — Komusubi — Maegashira

== See also ==
- Glossary of sumo terms
- List of active sumo wrestlers
