= Atamifuji Sakutarō =

Japanese professional sumo wrestler

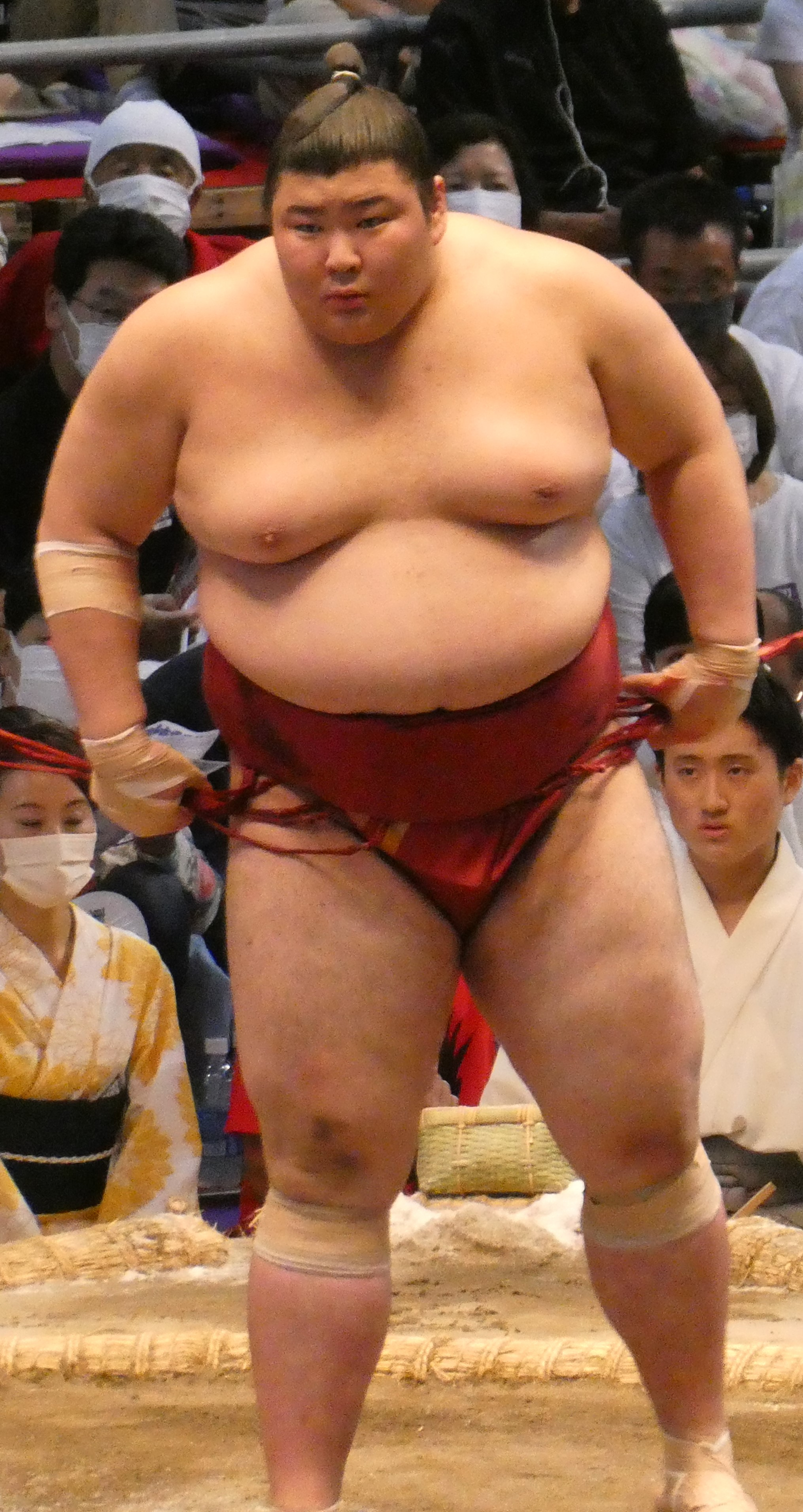
- Atamifuji in July 2022

Personal information
- Native name: 熱海富士 朔太郎
- Born: Sakutarō Takei; 3 September 2002 (age 24) Atami, Shizuoka, Japan
- Height: 1.85 m (6 ft 1 in)
- Weight: 198 kg (437 lb; 31.2 st)

Sport
- Sport: Sumo
- Rank: See below
- Heya: Isegahama
- Debut: November 2020
- Highest rank: Sekiwake (May 2026)
- Championships: 1 (Jūryō); 1 (Jonidan); 1 (Jonokuchi)
- Special Prizes: Fighting Spirit (4); Outstanding Performance (1)
- Gold Stars: 2 Hōshōryū; Ōnosato
- Updated on November 22, 2026

Atamifuji Sakutarō (Japanese: 熱海富士 朔太郎; born 3 September 2002 as Sakutarō Takei (武井 朔太郎, Takei Sakutarō)) is a Japanese professional sumo wrestler from Atami. He wrestles for the Isegahama stable and made his debut in November 2020. He won the championships in the two lowest divisions of jonokuchi and jonidan in early 2021. In November 2022, he was promoted to makuuchi, becoming one of the fastest in the history of professional sumo to reach the top division. His highest rank has been sekiwake, which he achieved in May 2026.

== Early life and sumo beginnings ==
Born in Chiba prefecture, Sakutarō Takei grew up in a single-parent household. He moved to Atami in Shizuoka prefecture in his second year of elementary school. He joined a sumo club in the nearby city of Mishima at the age of six. He joined Nihon University Mishima Junior High School where he was a part of the judo club, before turning to the sumo club during his second year of junior high school. During his high school years, he supported his family by cooking lunch boxes and doing part-time work as a dishwasher. Sakutarō then transferred to Atami Shiritsu Atami Junior High School before finally transferring to Hiryū High School in Numazu, where he was an active member of their well known sumo club. Atamifuji stood out as a wrestler who was not exceptional but who showed great passion for training. During his years at Hiryū High, he finished fourth in the 2019 National Athletic Meets. Although he failed to win the tournament, he credited his defeat with giving him the courage to turn pro as he could now compete at the national level. Although anticipating the National High School tournament in the summer of 2020, the tournament was cancelled due to the spread of the COVID-19 pandemic, and Sakutarō decided to turn pro upon graduating from high school in November 2020. He joined Isegahama stable because two graduates of Hiryū High School were already wrestling there (including Midorifuji) and the stable offered many advantages in terms of training facilities.

== Career ==
=== Early career ===
Sakutarō was given the shikona, or ring name, Atamifuji (熱海富士), a combination of "Atami" (熱海) coming from his hometown and "Fuji" (富士) from his stablemaster's ring name Asahifuji (旭富士). While in maezumō, Atamifuji won all three of his matches and entered the January 2021 tournament at the rank of jonokuchi 25. In his professional debut, he won the jonokuchi championship in a playoff. In the following tournament in March, he won the jonidan championship with a perfect 7–0 record. He continued to post strong winning records in the lower divisions, breezing through sandanme and reaching the makushita division for the July 2021 tournament. During his first tournament in that division, his hometown of Atami was hit by a massive landslide, making it a particularly emotional tournament for him as he continued to receive messages of support from stricken residents. It took only four tournaments in makushita to Atamifuji to be promoted to the jūryō division.

At the time of his jūryō promotion, Atamifuji had not produced a single losing record and was also the seventh-fastest promotion to jūryō in sumo history (excluding makushita tsukedashi) since 1958, when the six-tournament per-year system was introduced. His promotion also makes him the only sekitori from Atami. At the time of his promotion to sekitori, Atamifuji also received a keshō-mawashi from Hiryū High School.

=== Top division promotion ===
After suffering his first losing record in his debut tournament as a sekitori in March 2022, Atamifuji would post three straight winning records. In September 2022, Atamifuji earned a promotion to makuuchi, sumo's top division, for the November 2022 tournament with an eighth victory on Day 14 over Tochimusashi. It took only 12 tournaments to Atamifuji to reach the top division, which ties him in eighth place for the record of fastest progress to the top division since 1958. However, following poor results in the top division, Atamifuji was demoted to the jūryō division for the January 2023 tournament. At the time of his demotion he received harsh comments from his master and his senior Terunofuji who commented that he "had not yet taken shape" because "he has only risen to the makuuchi ranks on the basis of his qualities alone" and not because of his technique. During the next tournament, in January 2023, Atamifuji had to leave the tournament on Day 11 due to a case of influenza. As his absence was not related to a case of COVID-19, his rank was not protected and Atamifuji was demoted to the rank of jūryō 8. At the May 2023 tournament, Atamifuji was runner-up for the entire competition, beaten on score only by Ochiai and Gōnoyama, the winner of the jūryō tournament. Atamifuji finished the tournament with a score of 13–2 and inflicted his only defeat on Gōnoyama on Day 10. At the July tournament, Atamifuji, then ranked jūryō 1, won an eighth victory over Hakuyōzan, reinforcing the hypothesis of a repromotion to the makuuchi division. On the subject of this repromotion, he congratulated himself on maintaining his efforts and step through his kimon ('devil's gate'), to secure an eighth victory early in the tournament, in contrast to his previous jūryō tournaments where, after securing seven victories, he would often collapse only to complete a barely achieved kachi-koshi. Atamifuji then went on to win the jūryō tournament, after a playoff victory over Daiamami.

On his return to sumo's top division, Atamifuji, then the division's youngest active competitor at 21, maintained a leading position along Takayasu in the first half of the tournament, obtaining his first kachi-koshi in the top division on day nine, losing only on day five to Tsurugishō. From the tenth day, he became the only leader of the competition having defeated his co-leader and former ōzeki by oshitaoshi. However, Atamifuji lost his lead in the title race by recording two consecutive defeats against sekiwake Daieishō and ōzeki Takakeishō, on days twelve and thirteen respectively. During the latter part of the tournament, however, Atamifuji maintained a winning lead over three other wrestlers (Takakeishō, Daieishō and Hokuseihō). In his final match, he faced former ōzeki Asanoyama, needing to win the match to win the tournament outright and avoid a playoff situation with the other wrestlers having reached 11–4. However, Atamifuji lost the match by yorikiri, eventually taking him into a playoff against Takakeishō. Atamifuji also lost the playoff and missed out on the championship. For leading the championship for most of the tournament, however, Atamifuji received the Fighting Spirit award.

During the November 2023 tournament, Atamifuji also found himself in the group of wrestlers leading the tournament, recording five consecutive victories since the first day of the tournament. However, he lost his lead after suffering back to back defeats at the hands of Sakaigawa stablemates Sadanoumi and Hiradoumi, on Day 6 and 7 respectively. Atamifuji bounced back, however, and recorded six consecutive wins from day eight onwards, including a victory over ōzeki Hōshōryū on the twelfth day of the tournament. With eleven victories to his name, Atamifuji remained at the top of the standings, being equalled on day thirteen only by ōzeki Kirishima, with the championship victory to be decided on day fourteen, in the match between these two competitors; Atamifuji also competing for the fastest championship win in the history of the sport if he managed to achieve a yūshō in 18 tournaments since his debut. The ōzeki won the match by yorikiri, securing a lead over Atamifuji, who now had to win on the final day and bank on a Kirishima defeat to force a playoff. On the final day, Atamifuji lost his match against Kotonowaka, ending his playoff hopes. For his efforts, however, it was announced that Atamifuji would be the recipient of the sanshō for Fighting Spirit.

At the May 2024 tournament, Atamifuji stood out by inflicting defeat on ōzeki Hōshōryū. At the January 2025 tournament, he defeated ōzeki opponents Hōshōryū and Kotozakura, the latter occurring after a rare restart called when one of the ringside judges mistakenly raised his hand to stop the match.

=== San'yaku ===
In January 2026, Atamifuji earned his first two career gold stars by defeating both of the yokozuna (Hōshōryū and Ōnosato) on consecutive days. This followed in the footsteps of his stablemate Yoshinofuji, who defeated the two yokozuna on back-to-back days earlier in the tournament. Isegahama stable's Instagram account posted a photo of Atamifuji giving a bundle of prize money envelopes from his first kinboshi to his stablemaster, the 73rd yokozuna Terunofuji. It was reported that the stablemaster accepted the envelopes, but then returned an equivalent amount to Atamifuji. Atamifuji later became a contender to win his first Emperor's Cup, tying ōzeki Aonishiki for the tournament lead on Day 14 before losing to him in the playoff. Atamifuji received his third Fighting Spirit prize for his efforts. He was then promoted to the rank of komusubi for the first time in his career ahead of the March 2026 tournament, becoming the first wrestler from Shizuoka Prefecture to be promoted to the san'yaku ranks in 96 years (since the promotion of Tenryū to sekiwake in 1930). In his komusubi debut, Atamifuji defeated both ōzeki and yokozuna Ōnosato. He went into the final day with an opportunity to win the Fighting Spirit Prize if he could win a 10th match, though he lost to Takayasu and did not receive the award. Atamifuji was promoted to the rank of sekiwake for the May tournament.

During the July tournament, Atamifuji stood out by suffering only three losses halfway through the tournament, keeping him among the top group of wrestlers in contention for the championship. Starting on Day 9, he recorded five consecutive wins, notably defeating the yokozuna Ōnosato and Hōshōryū on Days 11 and 13, respectively. This last victory was seen as a solid foundation, provided he achieved strong results in subsequent tournaments to aim for promotion to the rank of ōzeki. On the 14th day, he stayed in the title race by defeating Shishi, another member of the group of wrestlers who were one win behind. Before the start of the tournament's final day, it was announced that Atamifuji would receive a fourth Fighting Spirit special prize for his performance during the tournament. In the final bouts of the tournament, Atamifuji won his match against Aonishiki, triggering a playoff involving the two wrestlers and Kirishima—a first in nine tournaments. Atamifuji managed to defeat Kirishima in his first match before losing to Aonishiki, who went on to win the final match of his playoff and claim the championship.

=== First bid to ōzeki ===
Thanks to his performance in July, Atamifuji found himself, for the first time in his career, in a position where he could realistically contend for the rank of ōzeki in September if he continued to perform well during the tournament. In order to reach the second-highest rank in the sport, he had to record at least 12 wins to reach the threshold of 33 cumulative wins across three tournaments, which is the standard requirement for promotion. Atamifuji got off to a strong start in the tournament, staying in contention for the title and posting an 8–2 record through the tenth day, when he notably defeated ōzeki Kotozakura. On the thirteenth day, however, he suffered his third loss to yokozuna promotion-seeker Kirishima, forcing him to go undefeated for the remainder of the tournament in order to keep his promotion hopes alive. The next day, he was defeated by tournament leader Ōnosato, which made his chances of promotion virtually hopeless. On the 14th day, Atamifuji suffered his sixth loss—his fourth in a row—further diminishing his chances of being promoted to the rank of ōzeki at the November tournament.

During the November 2026 tournament, Atamifuji remained among the top wrestlers in the tournament. Throughout the year, he had also maintained his position as a candidate for being the wrestler with the most wins that year, along Kirishima. However, he failed to secure the title on the eleventh day after suffering his second loss that day. In the final days of the tournament, he defeated both active yokozuna (Ōnosato and Hōshōryū) while suffering only one loss. On the eleventh and thirteenth days, however, he suffered two losses, knocking him out of title contention. Although he subsequently fell out of contention for the title, Atamifuji was named an unconditional recipient for a Outstanding Performance prize.

== Fighting style ==
Atamifuji is a wrestler specialized in yotsu-sumo grappling techniques. His preferred grip on his opponent's mawashi, or belt, is migi-yotsu, a right (migi) hand inside grip.

== Personal life ==
Atamifuji is the elder of two siblings. His younger sister, Hina Takei, is the current captain of the Hiryū High School sumo team. Hina is the first female captain of a club that produced sekitori and is particularly committed to the development of women's sumo.

Atamifuji is known for his demonstrative attitude, frequently smiling in the hanamichi when he wins and showing a sad face when he loses, which makes him popular with fans. On this subject, his coach Tateyama calls him "The Takamisakari of the Reiwa era" (令和の高見盛). During an interview at Okinoumi's retirement ceremony, his senior Terunofuji also dubbed him Kakukai no pudding (角界のプリン), meaning "Kakukai's pudding" referring to "Atami Pudding", a brand that recently sponsored Atamifuji.

== Career record ==
Atamifuji Sakutaro
Year	January Hatsu basho, Tokyo	March Haru basho, Osaka	May Natsu basho, Tokyo	July Nagoya basho, Nagoya	September Aki basho, Tokyo	November Kyūshū basho, Fukuoka
2020	x	x	x	x	x	(Maezumō)
2021	East Jonokuchi #25; 6–1–PP; Champion	West Jonidan #48; 7–0; Champion	East Sandanme #48; 6–1	West Makushita #55; 6–1	West Makushita #24; 5–2	West Makushita #14; 6–1
2022	West Makushita #1; 4–3	West Jūryō #12; 7–8	West Jūryō #12; 10–5	East Jūryō #6; 8–7	East Jūryō #3; 8–7	West Maegashira #15; 4–11
2023	East Jūryō #3; 3–8–4	West Jūryō #8; 8–7	East Jūryō #8; 13–2	West Jūryō #1; 11–4–P; Champion	East Maegashira #15; 11–4–P; F	West Maegashira #8; 11–4; F
2024	West Maegashira #1; 6–9	East Maegashira #2; 8–7	East Maegashira #1; 7–8	West Maegashira #1; 7–8	East Maegashira #2; 7–8	West Maegashira #3; 8–7
2025	West Maegashira #2; 5–10	East Maegashira #8; 6–9	East Maegashira #12; 8–7	East Maegashira #10; 11–4	East Maegashira #3; 5–10	East Maegashira #6; 8–7
2026	West Maegashira #4; 12–3–P; F★★	West Komusubi #1; 9–6	East Sekiwake #1; 9–6	East Sekiwake #1; 12–3–PP; F	East Sekiwake #1; 8–7	West Sekiwake #1; 11–4; O
Record given as wins–losses–absences Top division champion Top division runner-up Retired Non-participation Jūryō Lower divisions Sanshō key: F=Fighting spirit; O=Outstanding performance; T=Technique Also shown: ★=Kinboshi; P=Playoff(s); Divisions: Makuuchi — Jūryō — Makushita — Sandanme — Jonidan — Jonokuchi Makuuchi ranks: Yokozuna — Ōzeki — Sekiwake — Komusubi — Maegashira

== See also ==
- Glossary of sumo terms
- List of active sumo wrestlers
- List of active gold star earners
- List of active special prize winners
- List of sumo record holders
- List of sumo top division runners-up
- List of sumo second division champions
- List of sekiwake
