= Kotozakura Masakatsu =

Kotozakura Masakatsu may refer to:

- Kotozakura Masakatsu I (1940–2007), sumo wrestler, the 53rd yokozuna
- Kotozakura Masakatsu II (born 1997), sumo wrestler, current ōzeki, grandson of Kotozakura Masakatsu I
