= Daieishō Hayato =

Japanese sumo wrestler

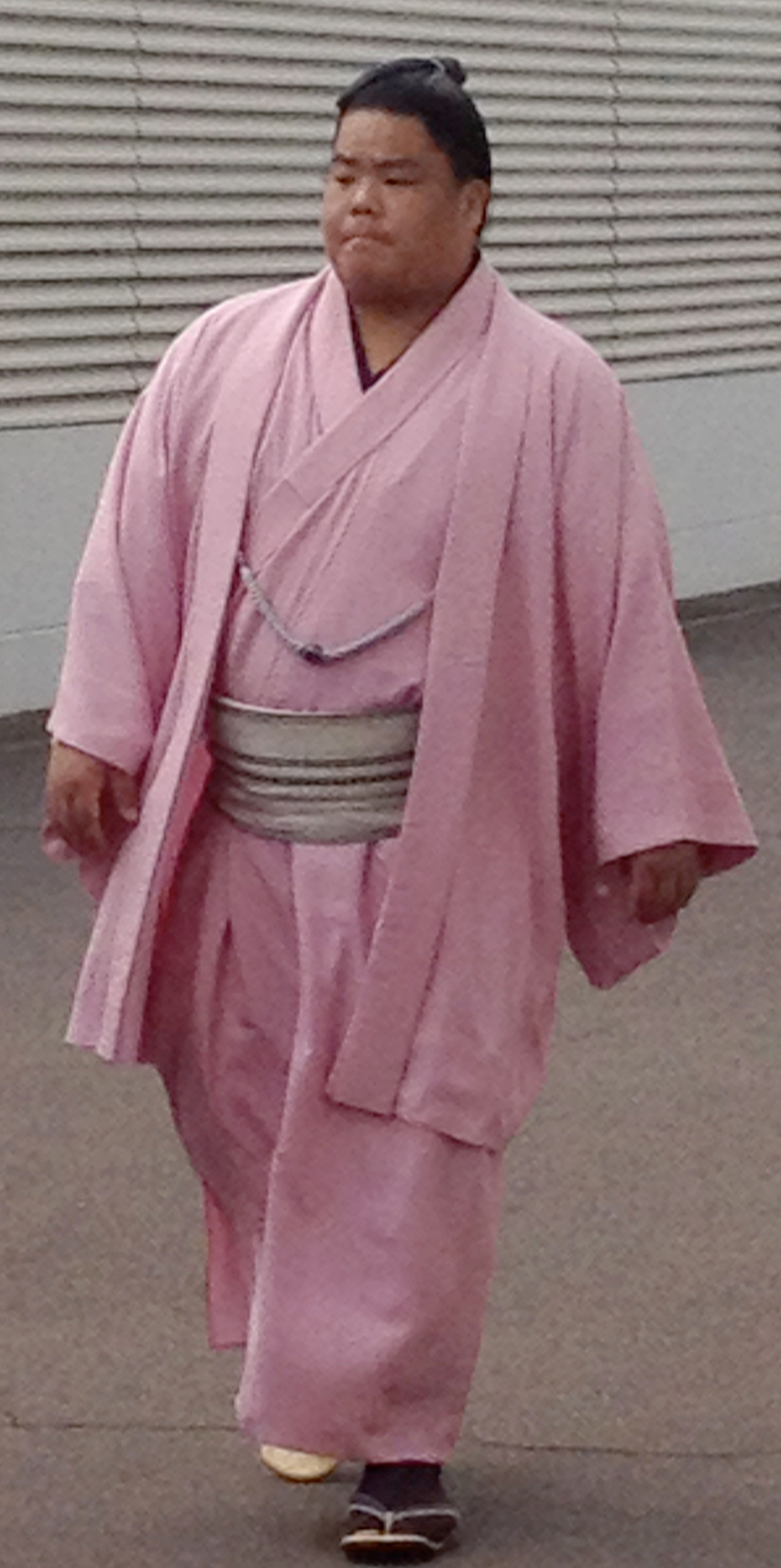
- Daieishō in 2014

Personal information
- Native name: 大栄翔 勇人
- Born: Hayato Takanishi; November 10, 1993 (age 33) Asaka, Saitama Prefecture
- Height: 1.83 m (6 ft 0 in)
- Weight: 160 kg (350 lb; 25 st)

Sport
- Sport: Sumo
- Rank: see below
- Heya: Oitekaze
- Debut: January 2012
- Highest rank: Sekiwake (September 2020)
- Championships: 1 (Makuuchi); 1 (Jūryō); 1 (Sandanme); 1 (Jonokuchi)
- Special Prizes: 5 Outstanding Performance; 2 Technique
- Gold Stars: 6 Kakuryū; Hakuhō; Terunofuji (2); Hōshōryū (2)
- Updated on March 15, 2026

Daieishō Hayato (Japanese: 大栄翔 勇人; born November 10, 1993 as Hayato Takanishi (高西 勇人, Takanishi Hayato)) is a Japanese professional sumo wrestler. He began his professional career in 2012 at the age of eighteen and reached the top makuuchi division in September 2015. His highest rank to date has been sekiwake. He has five gold stars for defeating yokozuna, five special prizes for Outstanding Performance and two special prizes for Technique. He wrestles for the Oitekaze stable. In January 2021 he became the first wrestler from Saitama Prefecture to win the top-division championship. He was a runner-up in the May 2022 and March 2023 tournaments.

== Early life and education ==
Hayato Takanishi was born on 10 November 1993 in Asaka, a city in Saitama Prefecture. He started sumo after winning a local tournament during his first year in elementary school. At junior high he was a member of a sumo club in Iruma, where he first developed his thrusting attack. He attended Saitama Sakae High School, a school famous for its sumo club, and earned a place in the club's first team near the end of his second year. In his final year he contributed to the school finishing in second place in the team competition at the national championships. After graduation he joined Oitekaze stable to pursue a professional sumo career. Coming from a single-parent family, he was keen to support his mother.

== Career ==
=== Early career ===
Takanishi Hayato entered sumo under his birth name but adopted the ring name Daishoei for his first competitive tournament. He won the jonokuchi division with a 7–0 record in March 2012 and a 6–1 record in jonidan in May saw him promoted to sandanme where he recorded four wins in July. He then modified his ring name slightly and became Daieishō. After winning records in the next two tournaments he was promoted to makushita but struggled in higher division and was relegated back to sandanme. A perfect 7–0 in May 2013 saw him take the divisional championship and secure a return to makushita. After three consecutive winning records (kachi-koshi) Daieishō was promoted to the second highest jūryō division for the July 2014 tournament, the 14th former student of Saitama Sakae's coach Michinori Yamada to reach the rank. After performing consistently in jūryō for a year he earned promotion to the top division (makuuchi) with a 9–6 record in July 2015.

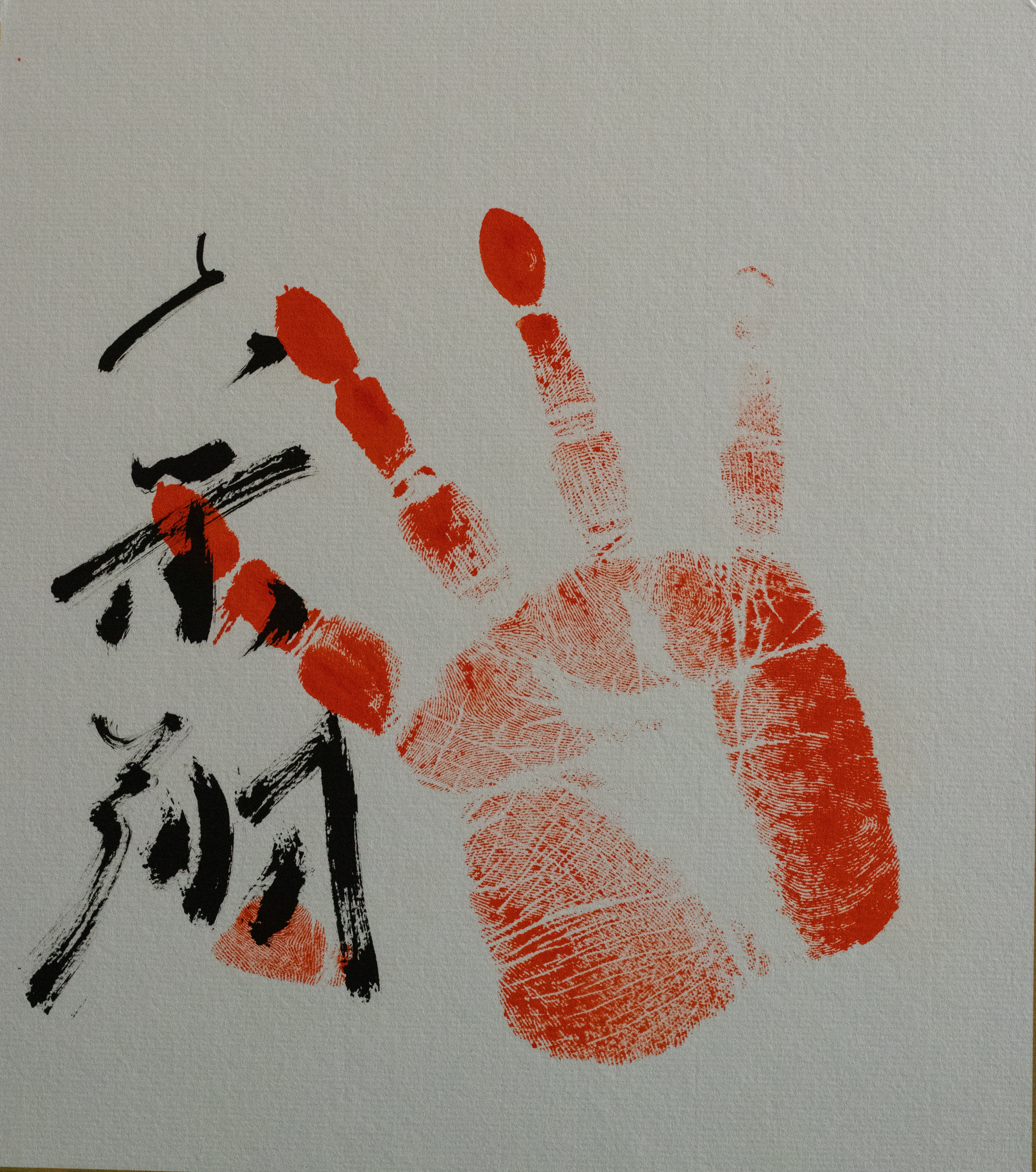
Daieisho original tegata (handprint & signature)

=== Makuuchi career ===
In September 2015 Daieishō made his makuuchi debut at the rank of maegashira 13. He was the youngest man in the division at 21 years old. He won seven of his first fourteen bouts, including an upset victory over Takarafuji but a final day defeat against Takekaze saw him end the tournament with a 7–8 losing record (make-koshi). In November he recorded only six wins and was demoted to jūryō but returned to the top division after an 8–7 record in January 2016. In March 2016 Daieishō produced a career-best effort, recording ten wins including victories over Ichinojō and Takekaze to place him in a tie for seventh place. In May, at career-high rank of maegashira 9 he stood at 6–4 after ten days but then slumped to five consecutive defeats. He struggled again in July, recording only five wins and dropped to maegashira 16 for September. His seven tournament run in the top division ended after a 5–10 record saw him relegated to jūryō for the November tournament but he responded with eight wins to put himself back in contention for promotion.

In January 2017 he won the jūryō division with a 12–3 record to secure his promotion back to makuuchi. He produced his best result in the top division to date in the March 2017 tournament, winning his last eight bouts in a row to finish on 11–4. This saw him promoted to his highest rank to date of maegashira 3 for the May tournament. Facing all the yokozuna and ōzeki for the first time, he followed his eight consecutive wins in March with eight losses in his first eight bouts in May and finished with a 4–11 record. After falling to maegashira 13 with a poor 5–10 score in November 2017, he recovered somewhat to post consecutive 9–6 records in the January and March tournaments of 2018.

He reached maegashira 2 in March 2019, and remained near the top of the maegashira ranks in the next few tournaments. In September he earned his first kinboshi with a defeat of Kakuryū, his first win over a yokozuna in eleven attempts. He attained a career highest rank of maegashira 1 in the November 2019 tournament, and earned his career kinboshi on Day 2 with a first win over Hakuhō in five attempts. Hakuhō went on to win the tournament and as the only man to defeat him, Daieisho received the Outstanding Performance Prize. He made his debut at the komusubi rank in January 2020, narrowly failing to secure a majority of wins, finishing on 7–8. He returned to komusubi in July 2020, where he defeated Hakuhō again, won his last six bouts to finish on 11–4 and won his second Outstanding Performance Prize. He was promoted to sekiwake for the September 2020 tournament, the first sekiwake from Saitama Prefecture since Wakachichibu in July 1963, but returned to the maegashira ranks after recording only five wins in the tournament.

Daieishō won his first Emperor's Cup in the January 2021 tournament with a 13-2 record at the rank of maegashira 1. He defeated all of the san'yaku wrestlers ranked above him in the first week, the first maegashira to so since 15 day tournaments began in 1949. He then lost to Takarafuji on day 9 and Onosho on day 11. He won his last four matches and clinched the title with a tsukidashi win over Okinoumi on the final day. He received both the Outstanding Performance Award and Technique Prize for his efforts. When interviewed he commented "My intention was always to push and drive the opponent out, which I could keep in my mind for the final bout. There were lots of bouts I could take confidence from too and I hope to keep wrestling the same way." He was the first wrestler from Saitama Prefecture to win the top-division championship. Although he was widely expected to return to his former sekiwake rank in the March 2021 tournament, he instead made his return to san'yaku at the rank of komusubi, and has affirmed his desire to accomplish promotion to ōzeki. He held the komusubi rank with an 8–7 record, but lost it after the May tournament and returned to the maegashira ranks. In September 2021 he earned his third career kinboshi by handing Terunofuji his first loss as a yokozuna on Day 9.

He returned to komusubi in January 2022, but held the rank for only tournament. He defeated Terunofuji again on Day 2 of the March 2022 tournament for his fourth kinboshi. Returning to komusubi for the May 2022 tournament, he defeated Terunofuji on the opening day, and finished with eleven wins and a share of second place. He was awarded his fifth Outstanding Performance Prize. He was promoted to sekiwake for the July tournament, but finished with a losing 6–7–2 record, due to a COVID-19 infection that ruled him out of action for the last two days of the tournament. He finished with 7–8 records in the last two tournaments of 2022.

In January 2023 he was ranked maegashira 1. In the January tournament he achieved a 10–5 record, which included wins over upper ranked wrestlers Hōshōryū, Wakatakakage and Shōdai. In February Daieishō won the 47th Fuji TV Grand Sumo Tournament defeating Hōshōryū in the final. In the March 2023 tournament he was promoted back to the rank of komusubi. Daieishō led the tournament going into the final day on 12 wins and two losses, but was defeated twice by Kiribayama, in their regulation match and in the subsequent playoff. In addition to runner-up honours he received a share of the special prize for Technique. This defeat left him feeling humiliated, especially as he was aiming for promotion to ōzeki at the time.

Having won 22 matches in the last two tournaments, starting from maegashira 1, Daieishō was given the condition for ōzeki promotion if he can score at least 12 wins in the May tournament. He would end up with a 10-5 record in the May tournament, thereby missing ōzeki promotion. However, after the tournament, the hypothesis of an ōzeki promotion received a response from the chairman of the judging committee, Sadagotake, who commented that the July tournament would be one where promotion to ōzeki would be considered if Daieishō's results were good enough. Daieishō would need 11 wins at the July basho to reach the normal ōzeki promotion requirement of 33 wins at san'yaku in three tournaments. Commenting on his potential promotion, Daieishō expressed his reservations. Celebrating his 30th birthday in 2023, he declared that unlike younger wrestlers who strive to detach themselves from the context of the promotion, he instead had to give it his full attention because at his age he might not have any more opportunities. Daieishō, who was nevertheless the sekiwake closest to promotion to ōzeki, nevertheless had a disappointing tournament, even though he achieved a score of 9–6 consolidating him in the rank of sekiwake. At the end of August, it was revealed that Daieishō had fractured a rib on the thirteenth day of the tournament in his match against Wakamotoharu. Competing injured, he decided to take a leave of absence from the regional tours and confessed to having difficulty recovering.

During the September tournament, Daieishō competed all the same, recording good results and placing himself, along Hokuseihō, in a situation where he could fight his way into a kettei-sen (playoff), having only one more defeat than tournament leaders Takakeishō and Atamifuji. Daieishō was also promised a prize for Fighting Spirit if he was to record an eleventh victory. On the final day of the tournament, Daieishō lost his match to Takakeishō, taking him out of the title race and preventing him from receiving the award.

At the March 2024 tournament he suffered his first negative score (make-koshi) in seven tournaments, having to be demoted for the May tournament. During the April tour, he also commented on his frustration at seeing his juniors (Hōshōryū and Kotonowaka) reach ōzeki status before him. At the May tournament, he however stood out by defeating Kotonowaka, freshly renamed Kotozakura, on Day 1 of the competition.

Daieishō began 2025 with a strong win record, however it was announced that he would be withdrawing from the start of the July tournament after he suffered a right calf injury during training at his stable. His stablemaster said that the injury worsened while the stable was at their training base in Yokkaichi ahead of the tournament. His stablemaster initially left open the possibility that he could re-enter the tournament later, but the medical certificate later released by the Sumo Association indicated that Daieishō's torn gastrocnemius muscle would require about two months of treatment. This absence would drop Daieisho to Maegashira 10 for the September tournament, marking the first time he was ranked outside the joi since January 2019.

At the January 2026 tournament, having climbed his way back to Maegashira 4, Daieisho won his fifth career kinboshi by defeating Yokozuna Hōshōryū on Day 8. This was part of a rare occurrence where all of the Yokozuna and Ōzeki were defeated on the same day. He would obtain his sixth kinboshi by defeating Hōshōryū on Day 8 of the March 2026 tournament.

== Fighting style ==
Daieishō is a tsuki and oshi specialist, which means he relies on thrusting and pushing techniques to defeat his opponents rather than belt-wrestling. By far the most common of his winning techniques is oshidashi which accounts for 55% of his wins. Although he also used belt gripping techniques during his high school career, he has focused on pushing and thrusting since turning professional. In an interview upon the announcement of his promotion to Juryo in May 2014, Daieishō was quoted as saying he wanted to thrust like former ōzeki Chiyotaikai.

== Career record ==
Daieishō Hayato
Year	January Hatsu basho, Tokyo	March Haru basho, Osaka	May Natsu basho, Tokyo	July Nagoya basho, Nagoya	September Aki basho, Tokyo	November Kyūshū basho, Fukuoka
2012	(Maezumō)	West Jonokuchi #13; 7–0; Champion	East Jonidan #12; 6–1	East Sandanme #49; 4–3	East Sandanme #34; 5–2	East Sandanme #8; 6–1
2013	East Makushita #33; 2–5	East Makushita #49; 3–4	West Sandanme #7; 7–0; Champion	West Makushita #11; 3–4	West Makushita #17; 5–2	West Makushita #8; 3–4
2014	West Makushita #13; 5–2	West Makushita #7; 5–2	East Makushita #2; 6–1	West Jūryō #12; 8–7	East Jūryō #9; 6–9	West Jūryō #11; 6–9
2015	East Jūryō #13; 10–5	East Jūryō #6; 7–8	East Jūryō #7; 10–5	West Jūryō #1; 9–6	East Maegashira #13; 7–8	East Maegashira #14; 6–9
2016	East Jūryō #3; 8–7	West Maegashira #14; 10–5	West Maegashira #9; 6–9	West Maegashira #11; 5–10	East Maegashira #16; 5–10	West Jūryō #4; 8–7
2017	West Jūryō #2; 12–3; Champion	East Maegashira #11; 11–4	East Maegashira #3; 4–11	West Maegashira #7; 5–10	East Maegashira #11; 8–7	West Maegashira #9; 5–10
2018	West Maegashira #13; 9–6	West Maegashira #8; 9–6	East Maegashira #3; 5–10	West Maegashira #7; 6–9	West Maegashira #10; 8–7	West Maegashira #9; 9–6
2019	West Maegashira #7; 9–6	East Maegashira #2; 7–8	West Maegashira #2; 7–8	West Maegashira #3; 8–7	East Maegashira #3; 8–7 ★	East Maegashira #1; 8–7; O★
2020	West Komusubi #1; 7–8	East Maegashira #1; 8–7	East Komusubi #1; Tournament Cancelled; State of Emergency; 0–0–0	East Komusubi #1; 11–4; O	East Sekiwake #2; 5–10	West Maegashira #2; 10–5
2021	West Maegashira #1; 13–2; OT	West Komusubi #2; 8–7	West Komusubi #1; 6–9	West Maegashira #1; 5–10	West Maegashira #4; 10–5; O★	East Maegashira #1; 8–7
2022	West Komusubi #1; 7–8	East Maegashira #1; 8–7 ★	West Komusubi #1; 11–4; O	West Sekiwake #1; 6–7–2	East Sekiwake #2; 7–8	West Komusubi #2; 7–8
2023	West Maegashira #1; 10–5	East Komusubi #2; 12–3–P; T	East Sekiwake #2; 10–5	West Sekiwake #1; 9–6	East Sekiwake #1; 10–5	East Sekiwake #1; 9–6
2024	West Sekiwake #1; 9–6	East Sekiwake #1; 6–9	West Maegashira #1; 11–4	East Komusubi #1; 8–7	East Komusubi #1; 8–7	West Sekiwake #1; 8–7
2025	West Sekiwake #1; 11–4	East Sekiwake #1; 9–6	East Sekiwake #1; 10–5	East Sekiwake #1; Sat out due to injury 0–0–15	East Maegashira #10; 7–8	East Maegashira #10; 10–5
2026	East Maegashira #4; 7–8 ★	East Maegashira #4; 7–8 ★	East Maegashira #4; 7–8	East Maegashira #4; 10–5	West Komusubi #1; 5–10	West Maegashira #4; 5–10
Record given as wins–losses–absences Top division champion Top division runner-up Retired Non-participation Jūryō Lower divisions Sanshō key: F=Fighting spirit; O=Outstanding performance; T=Technique Also shown: ★=Kinboshi; P=Playoff(s); Divisions: Makuuchi — Jūryō — Makushita — Sandanme — Jonidan — Jonokuchi Makuuchi ranks: Yokozuna — Ōzeki — Sekiwake — Komusubi — Maegashira

== See also ==
- Glossary of sumo terms
- List of active sumo wrestlers
- List of sumo tournament top division champions
- List of sumo tournament top division runners-up
- List of sumo tournament second division champions
- List of active gold star earners
- List of sekiwake
- Active special prize winners
