= Sanshō (sumo) =

Awards in sumo wrestling

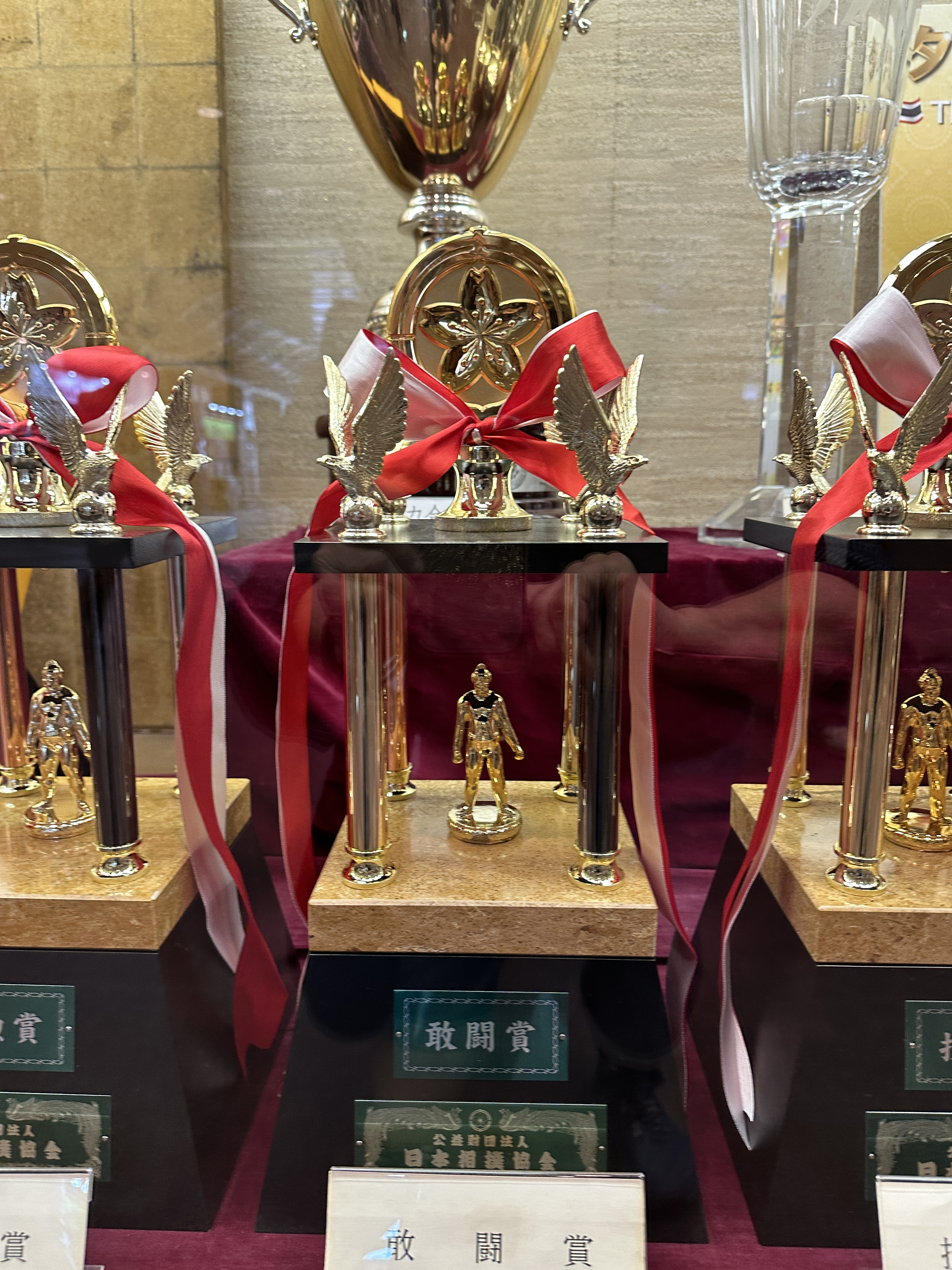
The Fighting Spirit sanshō prize in May 2023

Sanshō (三賞, lit. three prizes) are the three special prizes awarded in professional sumo wrestling to top division wrestlers (makuuchi) for exceptional performance during a grand sumo tournament (honbasho). The prizes were first awarded in November 1947.

== Criteria ==
All wrestlers in the top division below the rank of ōzeki are eligible; namely sekiwake, komusubi, maegashira. In order to be considered for a special prize, a rikishi must make a kachi-koshi or majority of wins during the tournament. Among eligible rikishi, the prize winners are decided by a panel which includes press writers covering the tournament. There is no requirement that the prizes must be awarded, and it sometimes happens that one or more of the sanshō are not given. It is also common for an award to be awarded to more than one wrestler.

The three prizes are

- Shukun-shō (殊勲賞), Outstanding Performance prize
- Kantō-shō (敢闘賞), Fighting Spirit prize
- Ginō-shō (技能賞), Technique prize

Typically, the Ginō-shō is awarded to a wrestler or wrestlers who display the most skillful kimarite, or techniques; the Shukun-shō is awarded to a wrestler who defeats the yokozuna or the eventual tournament winner, or who otherwise displays outstanding performance relative to his rank; and the Kantō-shō to a wrestler who has most clearly fought tenaciously and to the best of his abilities. The Ginō-shō is considered the most prestigious, and is also the prize most often not awarded at all: in 1988, it was withheld for five consecutive tournaments. However, each award is worth the same amount of money, two million yen.

It is a de facto standard that a newly promoted makuuchi wrestler who manages a 10–5 or better record in his first tournament will be awarded a sanshō, normally the Fighting Spirit prize. Similarly, a wrestler newly promoted to the san'yaku ranks above maegashira who achieves a 10–5 record can expect a prize for his efforts.

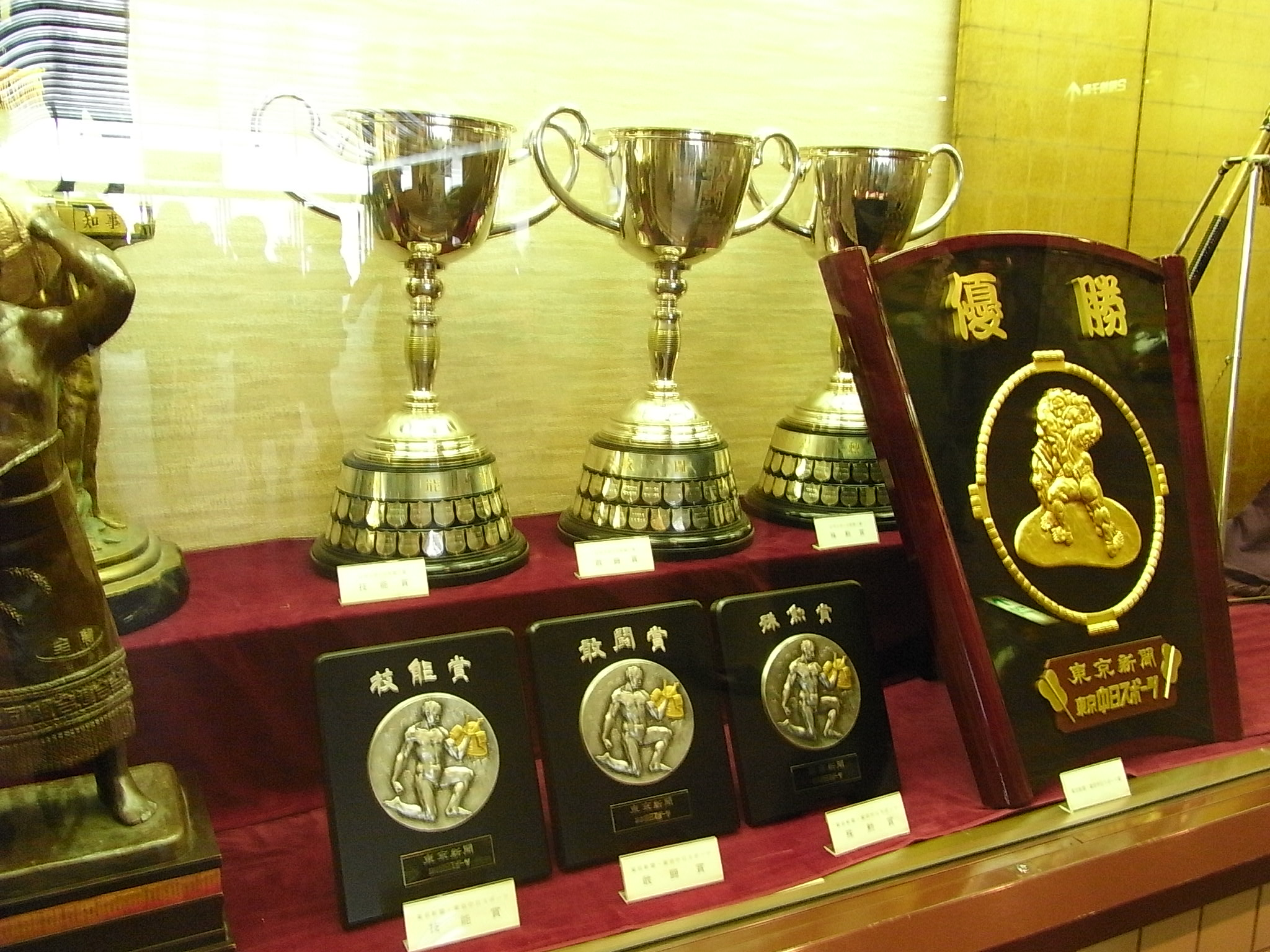
The three additional sanshō plaques (on the front) awarded by the Tokyo Shimbun in 2009.

There is no minimum or maximum limit to the number of sanshō that may be given. It is not uncommon for more than one wrestler to be awarded the same prize, or a single wrester receiving two prizes, or similarly one or two of the three sanshō to not be given out at all. The September 2023 tournament saw only a single sanshō received: Atamifuji earning Fighting Spirit for a record of 11–4–P as a maegashira 15, thereby finishing runner-up overall. For July 2023, eight sanshō were dispensed in total, the most ever, while September 2018 marked the first time since the introduction of sanshō in 1947 with none of the three prizes awarded at all.

Sanshō are announced before the final day's matches, otfentimes with a condition that the wrestler must win their last bout to receive the prize. For example, Wakatakakage received the Technique Prize in March 2022 unconditionally, but had to further win his last regular match too, claiming the championship with a 13–2 record, to also receive the Outstanding Performance prize. However, he lost the match, and even though he went on to win the championship in a playoff shortly afterwards, finishing 12–3–P, was denied his second award.

== Sanshō sweeps ==
On a few rare occasions, one wrestler has been awarded all three prizes simultaneously for his performance. This accolade has been given on only six occasions to six wrestlers.

Tournament	Wrestler	Rank	Record
July 1973	Daiju Hisateru	sekiwake	13–2
Sept 1973	Ōnishiki Ittetsu	maegashira 11	11–4
Jan 1992	Takanohana Kōji	maegashira 2	**14–1**
July 1999	Dejima Takeharu	sekiwake	**13–2**
Nov 2000	Kotomitsuki Keiji	maegashira 9	13–2
Mar 2024	Takerufuji Mikiya	maegashira 17	**13–2**

*record in bold indicates wrestler also took championship

In September 2001, Kotomitsuki, in his championship tournament, came very close to being the only wrestler to receive all three prizes twice, but the Fighting Spirit prize went to then maegashira Asashōryū.

== Active special prize winners ==
This is a running list of the number and type of all sanshō earned by all currently active wrestlers. Dates for a wrestler's professional debut, as well as their first and latest special prize earned are given.

The table is up to date as of the end of the November 2026 tournament.

Total	Name	F	O	T	Debut	First	Latest
14	Takayasu	7	4	3	2005-3	2013-1	2026-7
10	Mitakeumi	1	6	3	2015-3	2016-5	2022-1
9	Kirishima	4	1	4	2015-3	2020-1	2026-3
8	Ōnosato	3	2	3	2023-5	2024-1	2024-9
8	Wakatakakage	0	1	7	2017-3	2021-3	2026-5
7	Aonishiki	2	1	4	2023-9	2025-3	2026-7
7	Daieishō	0	5	2	2012-1	2019-11	2023-3
7	Shōdai	6	1	0	2014-3	2016-1	2020-9
6	Asanoyama	3	2	1	2016-3	2017-9	2019-11
6	Kotozakura	5	0	1	2015-11	2021-7	2024-1
6	Tamawashi	2	3	1	2026-11	2016-11	2026-11
6	Yoshinofuji	2	1	2	2024-5	2025-7	2026-5
5	Abi	4	1	0	2013-5	2018-1	2022-11
5	Atamifuji	4	1	0	2020-11	2023-9	2026-11
5	Takanoshō	4	1	0	2010-3	2020-3	2025-9
4	Fujinokawa	2	1	1	2023-1	2025-7	2026-9
4	Hakunofuji	2	1	1	2023-1	2023-7	2026-5
4	Kotoshōhō	3	1	0	2017-11	2023-1	2026-3
3	Hōshōryū	1	0	2	2018-1	2021-7	2023-7
3	Kinbōzan	3	0	0	2021-11	2023-3	2026-11
3	Sadanoumi	3	0	0	2003-3	2014-5	2025-5
3	Takerufuji	1	1	1	2022-9	2024-3	2024-3
3	Wakamotoharu	0	1	2	2011-11	2023-5	2026-11
2	Churanoumi	2	0	0	2016-3	2025-3	2026-9
2	Ichiyamamoto	2	0	0	2017-1	2023-11	2025-11
2	Meisei	1	1	0	2011-5	2021-3	2023-5
2	Nishikigi	1	1	0	2006-3	2023-7	2024-9
2	Ryūden	1	0	1	2006-3	2018-1	2019-5
2	Shimanoumi	2	0	0	2012-7	2019-5	2020-11
2	Tobizaru	1	1	0	2015-1	2020-9	2022-9
1	Enhō	0	0	1	2017-3	2019-7	2019-7
1	Gōnoyama	1	0	0	2021-3	2023-7	2023-7
1	Hiradoumi	0	0	1	2016-3	2024-7	2024-7
1	Kotoeihō	1	0	0	2022-1	2026-7	2026-7
1	Midorifuji	0	0	1	2016-9	2021-1	2021-1
1	Nishikifuji	1	0	0	2016-9	2022-7	2022-7
1	Ōhō	0	0	1	2018-1	2025-1	2025-1
1	Ōshōma	1	0	0	2021-11	2024-5	2024-5
1	Shōnannoumi	1	0	0	2014-3	2023-7	2023-7
1	Tomokaze	0	1	0	2017-5	2019-7	2019-7
1	Ura	0	0	1	2015-5	2021-11	2021-11
1	Fujiseiun	1	0	0	2021-3	2026-3	2026-3

== Exhibition tournaments ==
Prizes inspired by sanshō may be awarded outside of a 15-day grand sumo tournament. For the 2025 London tournament at the Royal Albert Hall, four special prizes were awarded at the end of the five-day competition: Takayasu won the Fighting Spirit prize, Tobizaru won the Outstanding Performance prize, and Ura won the Technique prize. Additionally, Ura won a unique Audience award for popularity determined by an online vote.

The Japan Grand Sumo Tournament, a one-day tournament held annually for professional sumo wrestlers at the Ryōgoku Kokugikan, besides awarding a trophy to the winner, awards a Fighting Spirit prize as well. For its 50th edition in 2026 the Special Prize recipient was maegashira Hiradoumi, who had only lost in semi-finals to eventual tournament champion yokozuna Hōshōryū.

== See also ==
- Glossary of sumo terms
- List of sumo record holders
- List of wrestlers with most gold stars
- List of wrestlers with most special prizes
- List of sumo top division champions
- List of sumo top division runners-up
- List of sumo trophies
