= Kirishima Tetsuo =

Mongolian sumo wrestler

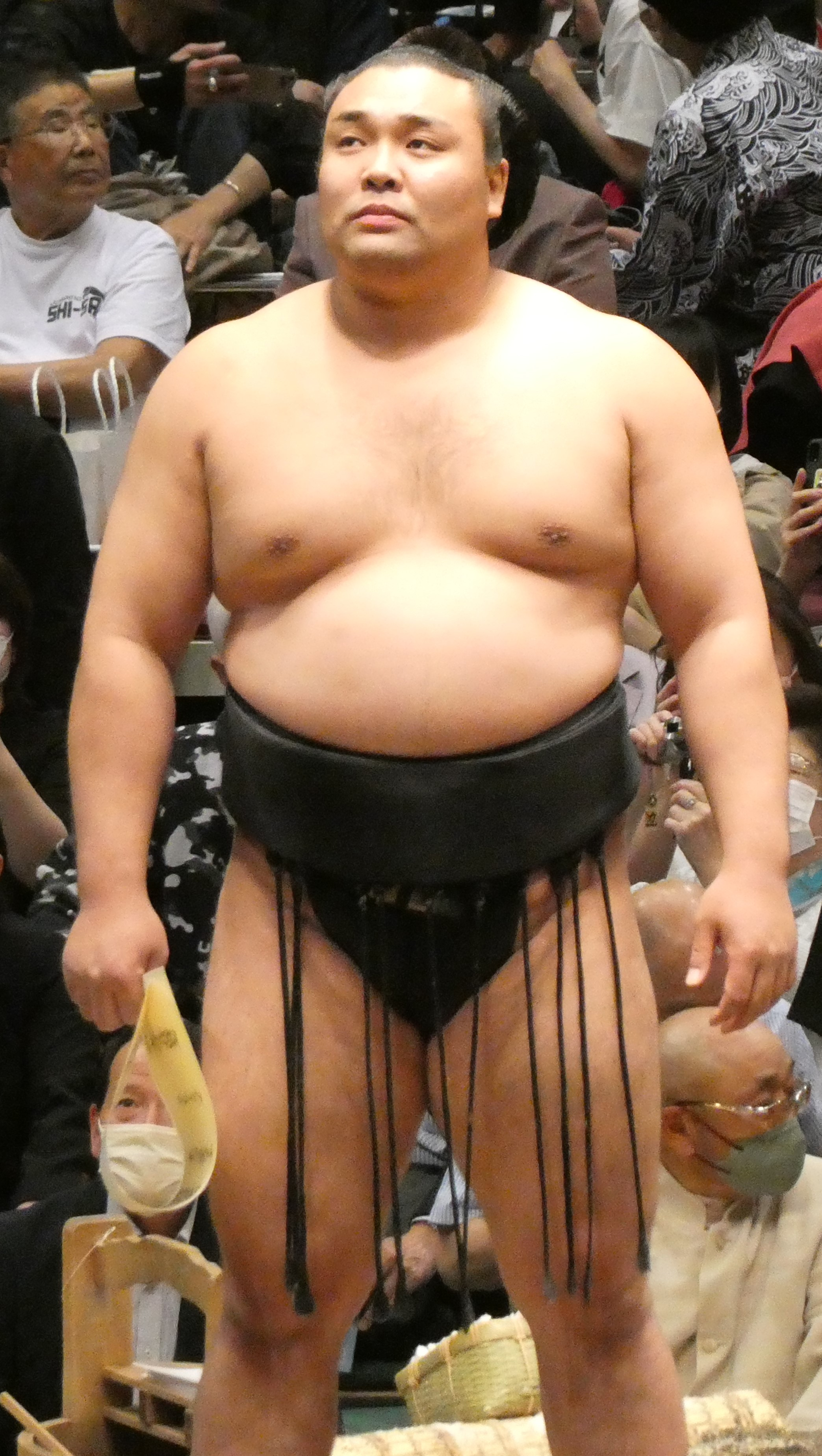
- Kirishima in 2023

Personal information
- Native name: 霧島 鐵力
- Born: Byambachuluun Lkhagvasuren; April 24, 1996 (age 30) Dornod, Mongolia
- Height: 1.86 m (6 ft 1 in)
- Weight: 150 kg (330 lb; 24 st)

Sport
- Sport: Sumo
- Rank: Ōzeki
- Heya: Michinoku → Otowayama
- Debut: May 2015
- Highest rank: Ōzeki (July 2023)
- Championships: 3 (Makuuchi); 1 (Makushita); 1 (Sandanme)
- Special Prizes: 4 (Fighting Spirit); 1 (Outstanding Performance); 4 (Technique)
- Updated on March 25, 2026

Kirishima Tetsuo (Japanese: 霧島 鐵力; born April 24, 1996, as Byambachuluun Lkhagvasuren (Mongolian: Бямбачулуун Лхагвасүрэнᠪᠢᠮᠪᠠᠴᠢᠯᠠᠭᠤᠨ
ᠪ
ᡀᠠᠭᠪᠠᠰᠦᠢ‍ᠷᠦᠡᠭ᠌)) is a Mongolian professional sumo wrestler. He made his debut in March 2015 representing Michinoku stable under the name Kiribayama Tetsuo (霧馬山鐵雄), and reached the top makuuchi division in January 2020. He wrestles for Otowayama stable, where he moved to in April 2024 following the closure of Michinoku stable. His highest rank has been ōzeki, a rank he gained in July 2023, lost in July 2024, and reclaimed in March 2026. He has won the makuuchi championship three times along with two runner-up performances and nine special prizes in his career to date.

Upon his first promotion to ōzeki in May 2023, Kirishima changed his ring name from Kiribayama, adopting the ring name of his then-stablemaster Michinoku (former ōzeki Kirishima).

== Early life ==
Lkhagvasuren was born into a nomadic community in Dornod Province, near the border between China and Russia. His name is a reference to his grandfather, Yatamsuren, who was a renowned bökh wrestler. His father was in charge of a vast herd of sheep, and from a young age, Lkhagvasuren rode horses to help his father at work, which strengthened his legs and waist – an advantage for sumo. He eventually moved to Ulaanbaatar and began practicing judo and bökh in a club, where he was joined later by future Yokozuna Hōshōryū. In 2014, he was invited by an acquaintance along with four other Mongolians to Japan to try out sumo at Michinoku stable with no previous experience of the sport. At that time, he was over 1.80 m (5 ft 11 in) tall, but weighed less than 70 kg (150 lb). Michinoku stablemaster, former ōzeki Kirishima, thought Lkhagvasuren was the best of the five, but was reluctant at first to take on a foreign recruit. The stable had not had a foreigner since Hakuba was forced to retire over match-fixing allegations in 2011. He eventually relented after Lkhagvasuren committed to staying in Japan, and let him take the new recruits examination in February 2015. As he entered his stable, his slight stature drew a comment from a wakaimonogashira in his stable, who commented that he would be too thin to hold his own in sumo.

Lkhagvasuren received the shikona, or ring name, Kiribayama (霧馬山) to evoke his master, with the kanji 霧 derived from his former wrestling name, Kirishima (霧島), his nomadic past with the kanji 馬, for 'horse', and finally the kanji 山 to evoke yokozuna Futabayama, a great wrestler who belonged to the same ichimon, or clan, as his stable.

== Sumo beginnings ==
He officially began his career in May 2015. At the time, he was in the same class as Homarenishiki, the first Canadian sumo wrestler (rikishi) in 30 years. During the first years of his stable life, he had difficulty adapting, mastering very little of the language and mentioning his lack of sleep when his stablemates snored too loudly in the stable dormitory. During his debut in maezumō, he faced Chiyonoumi (then called Hamamachi), a former vice-captain of Nippon Sport Science University sumo club, with whom he shared the same debut promotion. Hamamachi handed him his only defeat in four matches to determine his future position in the jonokuchi division. In his first match in this division, he lost again to Hamamachi, who won the tournament that year, but finished with a score of 5–2, securing promotion to the next division. In jonidan, he was among the wrestlers competing for the championship (yūshō), but was nevertheless beaten by Sakae, who then lost in the playoff to Hamamachi, during the last day of competition. However, his 6–1 score allowed him to enter sumo's third division, sandanme, for the November 2015 tournament. There, he won the tournament with a perfect score of 7–0. Logically promoted to the makushita division for the January 2016 tournament, he nevertheless suffered the first negative record (make-koshi) of his career and was demoted back to the sandanme division. He was promoted back to makushita for the Nagoya tournament, but suffered a left knee ligament injury during a practice session and had to withdraw from the tournament (kyūjō), and was demoted back to the lower division. Following this injury, Kiribayama gradually changed his fighting style, moving from an overuse of throwing techniques and back-dropping techniques to a style based more on forward momentum. At the time of his injury, he was also suffering from severe homesickness, but thanks to his master's efforts he hung on, motivated in particular by the prospect of returning to his homeland for a visit in the event of promotion to jūryō. In November 2017, he was competing for the makushita division championship but failed after being defeated by former jūryō wrestler Tochihiryū on the final day. However, he bounced back the following year by winning the championship at the May tournament, despite injuring his elbow during a training session.

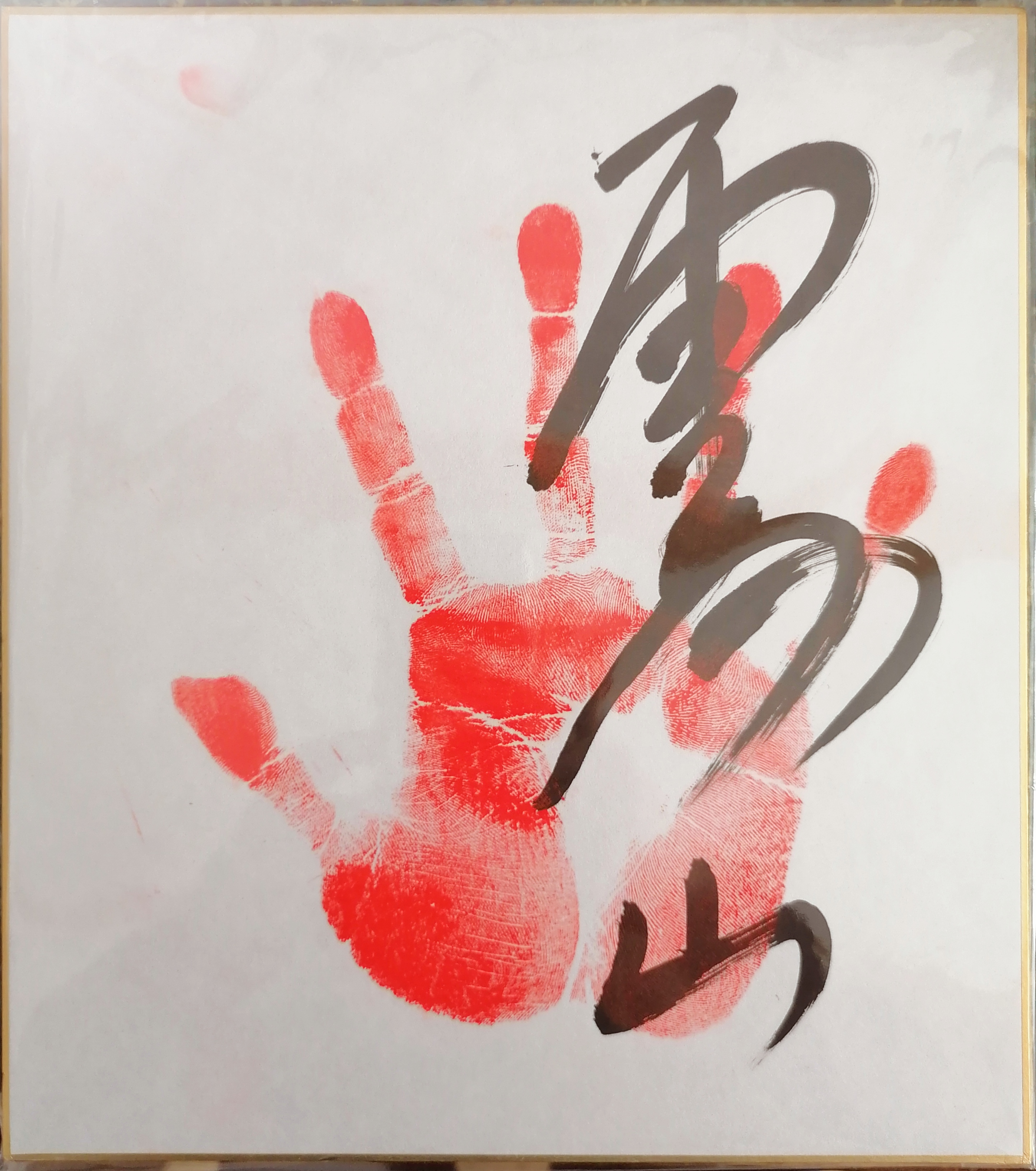
Original tegata (handprint and autograph) of Kiribayama

=== Jūryō promotion ===
In March 2019, Kiribayama was finally promoted to the jūryō division after a 4–3 record at Makushita 1. It took him four years in total to reach the sekitori ranks from his professional debut. He was the first new sekitori Michinoku stable had produced since Kirinowaka in January 2008. He shared his promotion with another future san'yaku wrestler, Wakamotoharu. During promotional interviews he spoke of his desire to fight with a black shimekomi, in order to evoke yokozuna Harumafuji. As part of his promotion, he also received a partnership with a jewellery brand that had already supported his master when he was active. The brand offered him a keshō-mawashi representing a black parrot. Kirishima moved through the jūryō division in just five tournaments. His fellow Mongolian, Yokozuna Kakuryū, became his stablemate in October 2019 when Izutsu stable closed. Kiribayama mentions this transfer as having been particularly beneficial for him because, although he was initially anxious at the idea of training with the yokozuna, he benefited from a great deal of advice from Kakuryū. He also expressed his desire to be tsuyuharai at Kakuryū's ring-entering ceremony if he managed to be promoted to makuuchi. In November of the same year, he took part in a four-way playoff for the jūryō championship along Ikioi, Kaisei and Azumaryū. Although he lost to Kaisei, his 11–4 record secured his promotion to sumo's top division, making him the first to be promoted to the rank of maegashira in his stable since Hakuba in May 2008.

== Makuuchi ==
=== Promotion and early career ===
In preparation for his tournament, he showed encouraging signs in training, having defeated 4-year makuuchi-veteran Shōdai, and revealed that he would indeed serve as an assistant to Kakuryū's ring-entering ceremony. Before the tournament, he also received a keshō-mawashi from Nestlé Japan as part of a partnership with his stable. In his debut top makuuchi division tournament in January 2020, he began the tournament with mixed results, having won his first match against Kaisei, but failed against Kotonowaka, who was still in jūryō, on the following day. From Day 8 onwards, he won against Kotoekō and went on to win his 7 last matches in a row; finishing the tournament with 11 wins to 4 losses and being awarded the Fighting Spirit special prize for his performance. In March, he stood at only four wins against six losses after Day 10, but won his last five matches to secure a 9–6 record and promotion to a new highest rank of Maegashira 3 for the next tournament, which was originally scheduled for May but actually took place in July. He withdrew on Day 10 of the September 2020 tournament with a shoulder injury, but returned from Day 13 to secure a winning record of 9–4–2. In September of the following year, Kiribayama set a personal record by scoring 4 consecutive victories for the first time in makuuchi, beating Komusubi Ichinojō in an unusually long match.

Kiribayama was promoted to komusubi for the November 2021 tournament, the first Mongolian to debut in san'yaku since Tamawashi and Terunofuji in March 2015. He managed only six wins against nine losses in this tournament, and returned to the maegashira ranks. He was promoted to komusubi again following the July 2022 tournament, and maintained his rank for the next three tournaments. In January 2023 he was runner-up with an 11–4 record and was awarded his first Technique Prize. He would be promoted to sekiwake for the next tournament in March.

In March 2022, Kiribayama had a good tournament, beating the newly promoted Ōzeki Mitakeumi on the fifth day, inflicting his first defeat since his promotion. In July of the same year, former yokozuna Kitanofuji published a letter to the editor in Chunichi Sports in which he congratulated Wakatakakage and Kiribayama on their match, which took place on Day 6. Although Wakatakakage won the match by yoritaoshi, Kitanofuji praised their stamina and power, even comparing the match to the legendary clashes between Yokozuna Tochinishiki and Wakanohana I.

In March 2023, he entered the final day of the tournament one win behind the leader and his next opponent, Komusubi Daieishō. Kiribayama was also competing on one day's rest after his Day 14 opponent, Wakatakakage, defaulted due to injury. In their scheduled contest, Kiribayama was able to repel Daieishō's charge and score the win by tsukitaoshi ('thrust down'). With their records equalized at 12–3, the two had to face off again to determine the makuuchi champion. In the playoff, Kiribayama used the same thrust down technique to defeat Daieishō. Kiribayama's first top-division championship was confirmed after the ringside judges agreed in a mono-ii that Daieishō touched the ground before Kiribayama stepped out of the dohyō. After receiving the Emperor's Cup, Kiribayama said that he didn't understand anything that was going on when he entered sumo in 2015, but "somehow, eight years later, I've made it this far." He was awarded his second Technique prize for his efforts. The following day Kiribayama, who became the ninth top-division champion from Mongolia, said that winning the yūshō was the best feeling, but that he would start focusing on the next tournament. Having won 23 contests in his last two tournaments, Kiribayama would likely be considered for promotion to sumo's second-highest rank of ōzeki by winning at least 10 matches in the May 2023 tournament.

=== Ōzeki promotion and name change ===
In the May 2023 tournament, Kiribayama secured the required tenth win with a victory over then-current ōzeki Takakeishō. He stayed in the makuuchi championship race until suffering his third loss against yokozuna Terunofuji on Day 14, finishing the tournament with 11 wins and his third straight Technique prize.

On 31 May 2023, Kiribayama's promotion to ōzeki was unanimously approved by the Sumo Association, and he made his formal acceptance speech when informed of the news at Michinoku stable. His parents from Mongolia flew in to Japan for the ceremony. With the promotion, Kiribayama became the sixth Mongolian ōzeki.

Following the promotion ceremony, it was announced that Kiribayama had changed his shikona (ring name) to Kirishima, inheriting the shikona used by his stablemaster Michinoku (former ōzeki Kirishima Kazuhiro). The stablemaster revealed that on Day 14 of the May 2023 tournament, with promotion appearing to be certain, he asked Kiribayama to adopt his old ring name. The former Kirishima told reporters that he wanted the new Kirishima to climb higher with his new name, and surpass him to reach the rank of yokozuna. Kirishima Tetsuo said that he would work harder than ever to live up to the rank of ōzeki.

In the run-up to the tournament, however, Kirishima had to stop training for the last two days of the preparation period because of an elbow injury. His series of injuries did not cease, however, and on the first day of the July tournament, it was revealed that Kirishima had complained of severe back pain, due to an inflammation in the back of the shoulder blade which had been going on for over a year. The issues forced Kirishima to declare himself kyūjō for his scheduled match against Nishikigi. The medical report stated that Kirishima had bruised his right ribs and would need about three weeks of rest and treatment, but his stablemaster said at the time that he could return during the tournament. Kirishima's absence was the first time since Musōyama at the May 2000 tournament that a newly promoted ōzeki had to withdraw on the first day of a tournament, and the fifth time in total since the start of the Shōwa era. A few days later, it was announced that Kirishima would participate on Day 4 of the tournament against Kotonowaka. The new ōzeki stated at the time that he desired to compete, saying that his health got a little better and that it would not be good to sit on the sidelines for too long. In their Day 4 contest, Kirishima pushed Kotonowaka out of the dohyō from behind to secure his first win at the ōzeki rank. Despite his comeback, Kirishima nevertheless reached a negative score (make-koshi) when he suffered a sixth defeat to the former ōzeki Asanoyama on Day 14 of the tournament.

During the 2023 September tournament, Kirishima entered as a competitor under kadoban status, having to record at least eight victories to save his ōzeki rank. On the thirteenth day, he scored a victory over newly promoted-ōzeki Hōshōryū, logically saving his status for the November tournament. He concluded this basho with a 9–6 score.

In October 2023, Kirishima won for the first time the All Japan Rikishi Championship, a Meiji Shrine-sponsored charity tournament.

=== First yokozuna attempt and demotion ===
During the November 2023 tournament, Kirishima was part of the group of wrestlers leading the championship race. On Day 13, he defeated Daieishō to take the lead for most wins by a top-division wrestler in the year. Having only been equaled in score by Atamifuji on Day 13, Kirishima's title hopes and a potential championship were at stake when he faced Atamifuji on Day 14. Kirishima won the match by yorikiri, securing a one-win lead in the championship race into the final day. Kirishima locked up his second title when Atamifuji was defeated by Kotonowaka. In the final bout, Kirishima defeated fellow ōzeki Takakeishō to finish with a 13–2 record for the tournament and 62 wins for the year. Kirishima dedicated his victory in the tournament–held in Kyushu–to his stablemaster Michinoku, who was born in Kagoshima Prefecture. The Sumo Association indicated that Kirishima would likely be considered for promotion to yokozuna with another championship in January, or an equivalent performance.

Kirishima made a good start to the tournament, although he also suffered two defeats on Day 4 against Midorifuji and on Day 8 against Tobizaru. On Day 13, he defeated the other remaining ōzeki, Hōshōryū, by nimaigeri ('ankle kicking twist down'), a technique not seen in makuuchi for ten years. This victory, his fifth in a row, ensured him a place in the group of three wrestlers tied for the title (with Terunofuji and Kotonowaka). However, Kirishima was beaten by Kotonowaka on Day 14, forcing him to beat the yokozuna on the final day to secure a place in a playoff. Kirishima failed to beat Terunofuji, ending his chances of winning the tournament. After the tournament, the head of the Judging Department, Sadogatake, commented that had Kirishima won a twelfth victory by defeating Terunofuji, he would have submitted a recommendation for promotion to yokozuna.

In anticipation of his master's 65th birthday in April 2024, it was announced that Michinoku stable would close after the March 2024 tournament, with its wrestlers to be distributed within the Tokitsukaze ichimon. According to sources inside the Sumo Association, Kirishima asked to be transferred to the care of former yokozuna Kakuryū in Otowayama stable. During this same March tournament, Kirishima performed poorly, suffering an eighth defeat on Day 11 against Wakamotoharu, with the certainty of being relegated to kadoban status for the May tournament. In total, he recorded just five victories in the tournament, including a notable last one against fellow-ōzeki Kotonowaka. Disappointed by his performance, he nevertheless confirmed that he was looking forward to being trained by Otowayama, declaring that he intended to prepare as quickly as possible for the May tournament. Later that same month, he withdrew from regional tours for medical reasons, citing a neck contusion, doubled by a contusion of both elbows and a right triceps tendonitis.

Kirishima's performances were impacted by his injuries and at the May 2024 tournament, during which Kirishima wrestled under the status of kadoban-ōzeki, he recorded a series of consecutive defeats. He withdrew on Day 7 after scoring just one win. Kirishima would not return to the tournament, with his new stablemaster Otowayama commenting that he had neck pain and would be hospitalized for a few days. Kirishima was demoted to sekiwake for the July tournament, where he needed to win ten matches in order to return to sumo's second-highest rank. His bid to do so came to an end when he lost his sixth match on Day 13 of the July tournament. He did, however, finish with eight wins, to retain the sekiwake rank going into the September tournament.

=== Third Emperor's Cup and return to ōzeki ===
On the occasion of the pre-tournament training in September, during which he competed against former ōzeki Shōdai and Mitakeumi, Kirishima reassured the press by mentioning his desire to win a double-digit record in the hope of regaining his former rank, and by communicating on the recovery of his injuries. Kirishima managed to finish the September 2024 tournament with twelve wins, which was his second runner-up performance. At the January 2025 tournament, Kirishima, fighting as a maegashira for the first time since July 2022, recorded 11 wins and won his second Fighting Spirit Prize. Ranked as a komusubi in March 2025, Kirishima won eight matches and was repromoted to sekiwake. At the May 2025 tournament, Kirishima resumed a long winning streak that could enable him to regain his former ōzeki rank by scoring 11 victories, which also earned him a fourth Technique prize. However, Kirishima struggled with consistency during this time, being unable to earn double-digit victories in consecutive tournaments.

At the November 2025 tournament, fighting as maegashira 2, Kirishima won 11 matches and was awarded his third Fighting Spirit Prize. He repeated the feat in January 2026, when he won 11 more matches and received his fourth Fighting Spirit Prize by defeating Abi on the final day. Going into the March 2026 tournament, Kirishima had won 22 matches in the past 2 tournaments, making a return to ōzeki a possibility by the end of the tournament. Kirishima would need 11 more wins to reach the 33 wins over 3 tournaments benchmark used for ōzeki promotion. Kirishima started out the tournament in excellent fashion, losing only to Churanoumi on Day 2. Following this, he would record eight consecutive victories to be tied for the lead in the title race at 9–1. On Day 10, Kirishima faced co-leader Gonoyama. Kirishima thrust Gonoyama down to obtain his 10th victory and take the sole lead of the March title race. He continued his bid for the title with a victory against yokozuna Hōshōryū the next day, and he moved even closer to the title with his defeat of Ōhō on Day 13. On Day 14, Kirishima was 12–1 and held a two-win lead in the title race, meaning a win here would secure the title. However, he was defeated by ōzeki Aonishiki, though the other title contenders, Hōshōryū and Kotoshōhō, were also defeated, dropping them both to 10–4. Because of this, Kirishima was able to secure the championship. He was also defeated on Day 15 by ōzeki Kotozakura, meaning he finished with a 12–3 record. Kirishima also took home the Outstanding Performance Prize, which was his first time winning that award and his ninth sanshō overall. His championship also meant that he had won 34 matches over the past 3 tournaments, making a return to Ōzeki highly likely.

Kirishima's return to ōzeki was formalized at a board meeting on 25 March. This made Kirishima only the third wrestler since the introduction of the kadoban system in 1969 to go through the full process of being promoted to ōzeki twice, after Kaiketsu and Terunofuji. In his acceptance speech, Kirishima vowed to "reach even greater heights".

=== Second and third yokozuna bid ===
Given that his record had earned him a spot in the championship playoff, it was widely believed that the July tournament would represent a second chance for Kirishima to claim the top rank in sumo hierarchy. Since the standard for such a promotion is to win two consecutive tournaments as an ōzeki or achieve a similar performance, it was also widely accepted that Kirishima would have to win the championship to become a yokozuna.

During the tournament, Kirishima performed well, recording ten wins and two losses on the twelfth day, and also defeating yokozuna Ōnosato in his final bout. On the thirteenth day, however, Kirishima’s chances of promotion dimmed when he lost to sekiwake Aonishiki, who was also among the wrestlers in contention for the championship, suffering his third loss and falling out of the leading group. On the fourteenth day, Hōshōryū, one of the two yokozuna, withdrew from the tournament, handing Kirishima a default victory and keeping him in the title race among the wrestlers who are one loss behind the leader, Aonishiki. Kirishima entered the final day of the tournament by defeating fellow ōzeki Kotozakura, thereby qualifying for a playoff for the championship against Atamifuji and Aonishiki—a first in nine tournaments. Kirishima lost both of his bouts, first to Atamifuji and then to Aonishiki, who went on to win the tournament this month. Although he fell short in his quest for the top title, Kirishima received congratulations from Asakayama (the former Kaiō), who commended him on his 12 wins and added that the Judging Department would review his promotion to the rank of yokozuna—subject to certain conditions—if he managed to win the September tournament.

Kirishima's run was far from ideal, as he had already suffered two losses by the sixth day; nevertheless, he managed to stay in the group chasing the tournament leaders. On the eighth day, he suffered a third loss to Churanoumi, which meant he could virtually no longer afford to make any mistakes. His two consecutive losses on the ninth and tenth days—against Daieishō and Fujiryōga, respectively—also ended his run for the top title. During the November 2026 tournament, Kirishima remained among the top wrestlers in the tournament. On the eleventh day, he secured the title of wrestler with the most wins that year after his direct rival, Atamifuji, suffered a loss that day. This marked the second time in three years that Kirishima had achieved this feat.

== Fighting style ==
According to his Japan Sumo Association profile, Kirishima's preferred grip on his opponent's mawashi is hidari-yotsu, a right arm outside and left hand inside position. His favourite techniques are listed as yori-kiri (force out) and nage (throws), both underarm and overarm. In the run-up to his top division promotion he increased his weight to 140 kg (310 lb), giving him a more powerful attack, but he is still able to outmaneuver his opponents by his speed and footwork. During the early years of his career, he aimed to emulate the style of his master and the Mongolian yokozuna Harumafuji and Asashōryū.

== Personal life ==
Kirishima maintains a decade-long friendship with judoka Ryunosuke Haga.

== Career record ==
Kirishima Tetsuo
Year	January Hatsu basho, Tokyo	March Haru basho, Osaka	May Natsu basho, Tokyo	July Nagoya basho, Nagoya	September Aki basho, Tokyo	November Kyūshū basho, Fukuoka
2015	x	x	(Maezumō)	West Jonokuchi #20; 5–2	West Jonidan #67; 6–1	West Sandanme #96; 7–0; Champion
2016	West Makushita #59; 3–4	East Sandanme #12; 4–3	East Sandanme #3; 6–1	East Makushita #30; Sat out due to injury 0–0–7	East Sandanme #11; 6–1	East Makushita #35; 5–2
2017	East Makushita #20; 5–2	West Makushita #12; 3–4	East Makushita #18; 6–1	East Makushita #10; 3–4	West Makushita #14; 0–1–6	West Makushita #49; 6–1
2018	West Makushita #21; 4–3	Makushita #16; 2–5	West Makushita #35; 7–0; Champion	West Makushita #3; 3–4	East Makushita #6; 3–4	West Makushita #12; 6–1
2019	West Makushita #1; 4–3	West Jūryō #14; 9–6	West Jūryō #11; 8–7	West Jūryō #9; 10–5	West Jūryō #4; 7–8	West Jūryō #5; 11–4–P
2020	East Maegashira #17; 11–4; F	West Maegashira #8; 9–6	West Maegashira #3; Tournament Cancelled; State of Emergency; 0–0–0	West Maegashira #3; 6–9	East Maegashira #5; 9–4–2	East Maegashira #1; 3–12
2021	West Maegashira #8; 8–7	East Maegashira #4; 7–8	East Maegashira #4; 6–9	West Maegashira #6; 9–6	West Maegashira #2; 9–6	West Komusubi #1; 6–9
2022	West Maegashira #1; 6–9	East Maegashira #4; 10–5	East Maegashira #2; 10–5	East Maegashira #1; 8–7	West Komusubi #2; 9–6	West Komusubi #1; 8–7
2023	East Komusubi #1; 11–4; T	East Sekiwake #2; 12–3–P; T	East Sekiwake #1; 11–4; T	West Ōzeki #1; 6–7–2	East Ōzeki #1; 9–6	West Ōzeki #1; 13–2
2024	East Ōzeki #1; 11–4	East Ōzeki #1; 5–10	West Ōzeki #2; 1–6–8	East Sekiwake #2; 8–7	East Sekiwake #2; 12–3	East Sekiwake #1; 6–9
2025	West Maegashira #1; 11–4; F	East Komusubi #1; 8–7	West Sekiwake #1; 11–4; T	West Sekiwake #1; 8–7	West Sekiwake #1; 6–9	East Maegashira #2; 11–4; F
2026	East Sekiwake #1; 11–4; F	East Sekiwake #1; 12–3; O	East Ōzeki #2; 12–3–P	East Ōzeki #1; 12–3–PP	East Ōzeki #1; 8–7	East Ōzeki #2; 10–5
Record given as wins–losses–absences Top division champion Top division runner-up Retired Non-participation Jūryō Lower divisions Sanshō key: F=Fighting spirit; O=Outstanding performance; T=Technique Also shown: ★=Kinboshi; P=Playoff(s); Divisions: Makuuchi — Jūryō — Makushita — Sandanme — Jonidan — Jonokuchi Makuuchi ranks: Yokozuna — Ōzeki — Sekiwake — Komusubi — Maegashira

== See also ==
- Glossary of sumo terms
- List of active sumo wrestlers
- List of Mongolian sumo wrestlers
- List of non-Japanese sumo wrestlers
- List of active special prize winners
- List of sumo top division champions
- List of sumo top division runners-up
- List of ōzeki
