= Otowayama stable =

Stable of sumo wrestlers

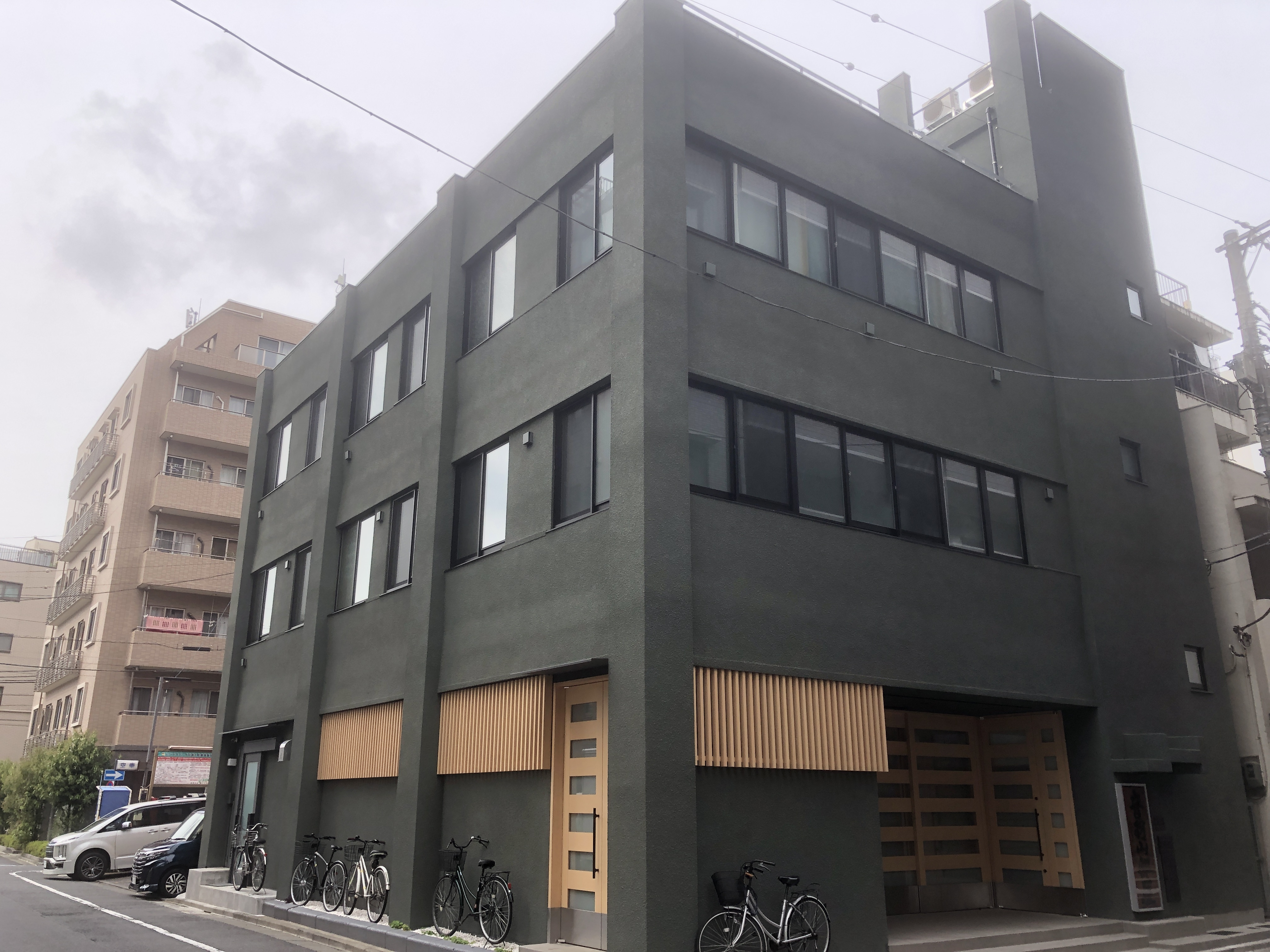

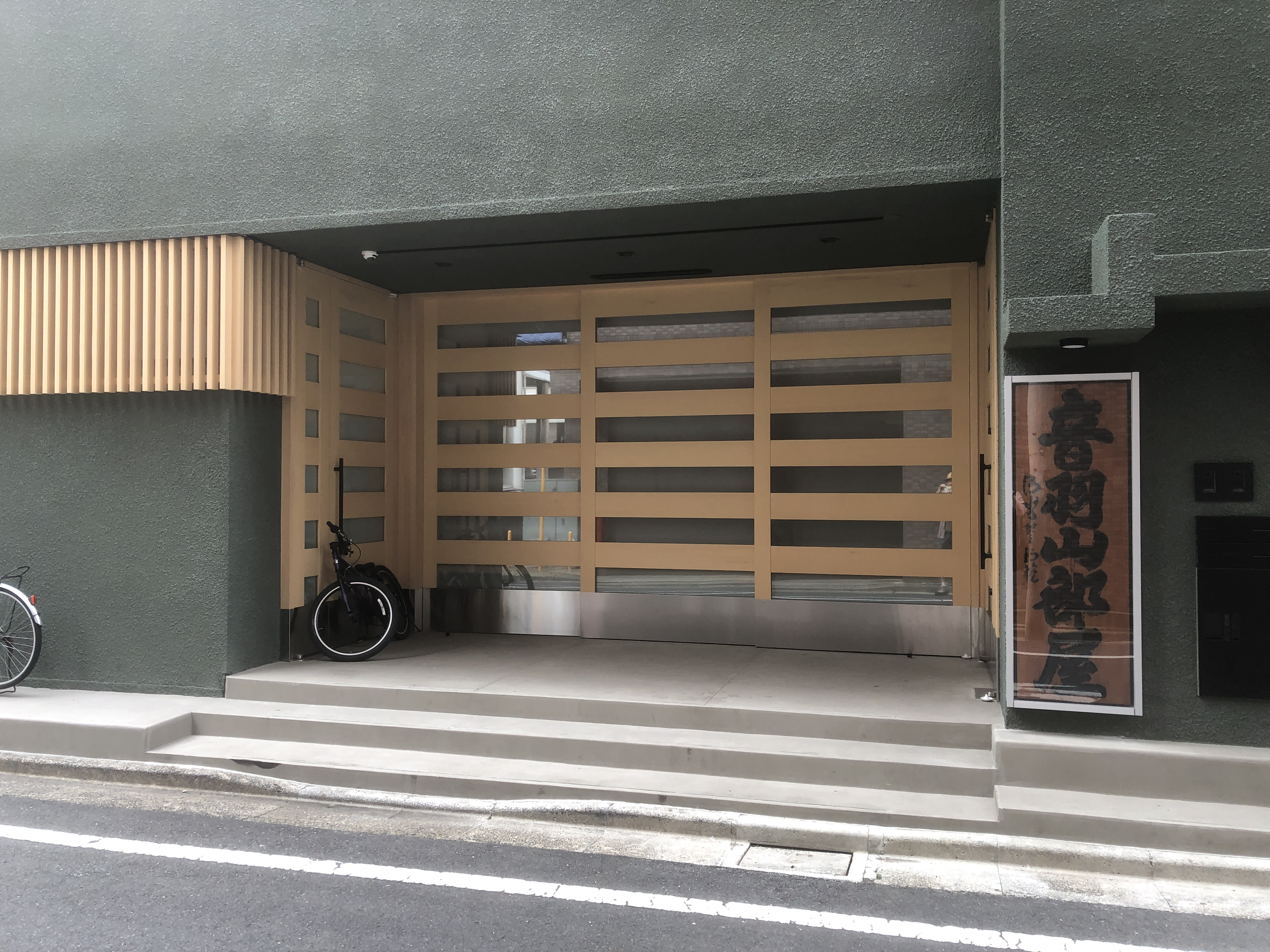

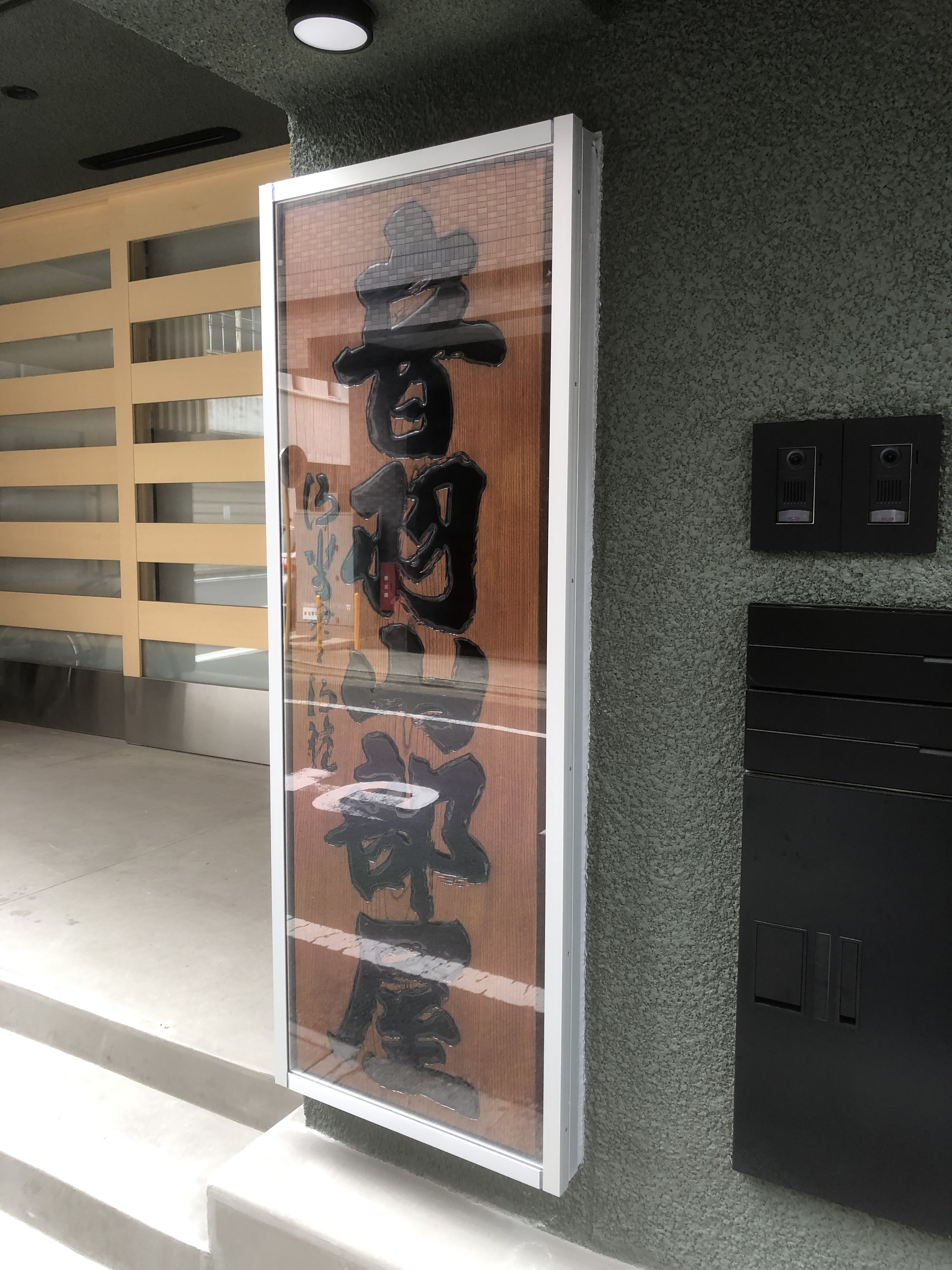

Otowayama stable (音羽山部屋, Otowayama-beya) is a stable of sumo wrestlers, part of the Tokitsukaze ichimon, or group of stables. It was formed by the 71st Yokozuna Kakuryū in December 2023 after he became independent from Michinoku stable.

As of May 2026, the stable has 11 active wrestlers.

== History ==
On 27 December 2023 the Sumo Association announced that Kakuryū would inherit the Otowayama elder stock, which had been vacated earlier in the year by former maegashira Tenkaihō. Additionally, he was given approval to branch off from Michinoku stable and form his own stable with two wrestlers and a senior tokoyama going along. Creating the first incarnation of the Otowayama stable in 78 years. The stable is located in a three-story building in Sumida, Tokyo that was previously used by the local government before being renovated for use by sumo wrestlers.

In April 2024 the stable inaugurated its nameplate featuring calligraphy by Mori Kiyonori, the head priest at Kiyomizu-dera in Kyoto who is known for writing the emblematic kanji of the year in Japan. During the same month, the stable housed the transfer of ōzeki Kirishima and the former head coach of Michinoku stable (Kirishima Kazuhiro) following the closure of the latter after Kazuhiro reached the mandatory retirement age set by the Japan Sumo Association.

== Owners ==
2023–present: 24th Otowayama Rikisaburō (iin, the 71st yokozuna Kakuryū, born 1985).

== Coaches ==
- Michinoku Kazuhiro (san'yo, ōzeki Kirishima, born 1959)

== Notable active wrestlers ==
- Kirishima (best rank ōzeki)
- Ryūhō (best rank jūryō)

== Usher ==
- Shin (makushita yobidashi, real name Shinnosuke Yamaki, born 1994)

== Location and access ==
Tokyo, Sumida Ward, Mukojima 2–17–11
13 minute walk from Honjo-azumabashi Station on Toei Asakusa Line

== See also ==
- List of sumo stables
- List of active sumo wrestlers
- List of past sumo wrestlers
- Glossary of sumo terms
