= Kotozakura Masakatsu II =

Japanese sumo wrestler

Kotozakura Masakatsu
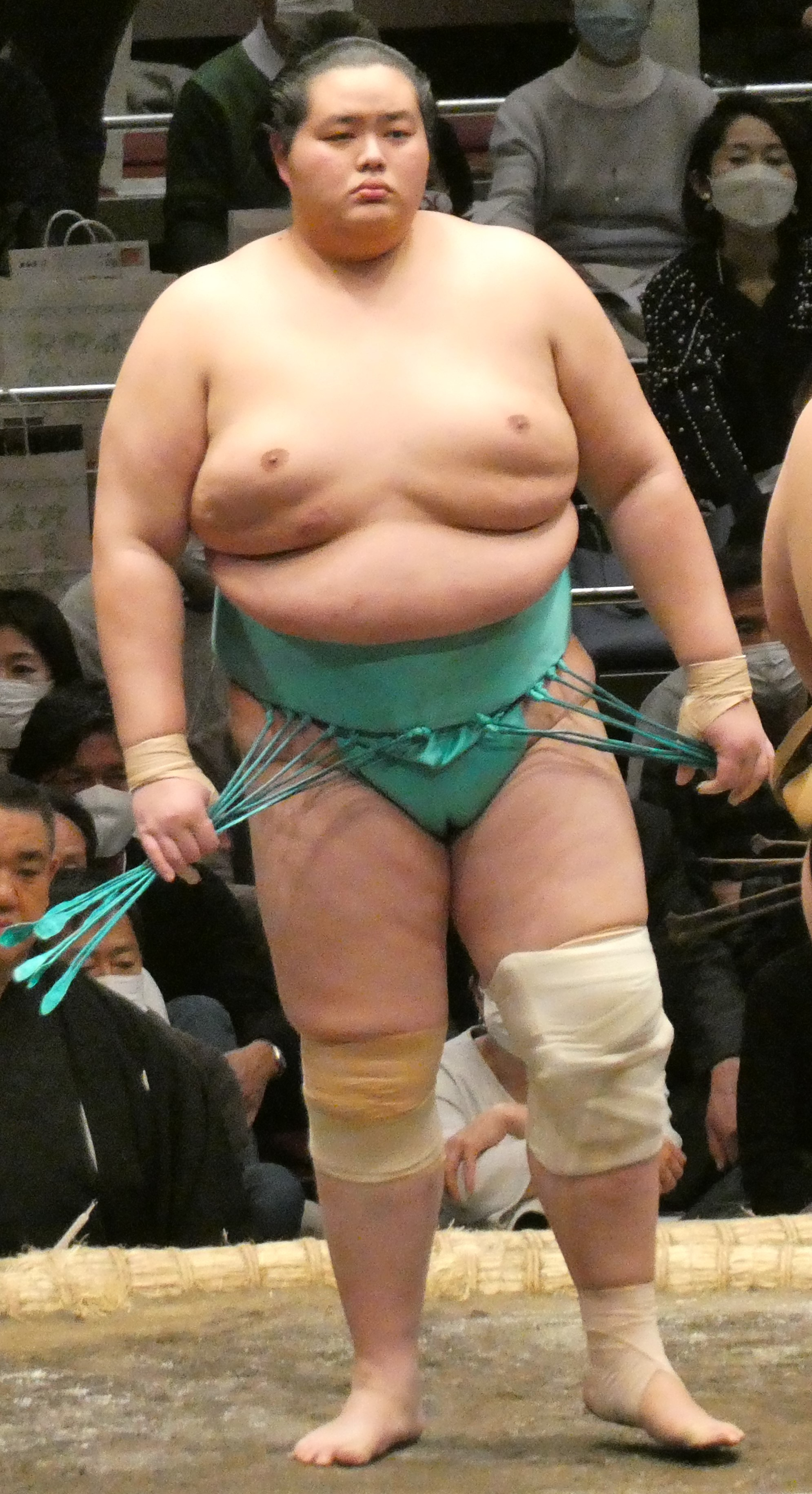
- Kotozakura in January 2022 (as Kotonowaka)

Personal information
- Native name: 琴櫻 将傑
- Born: Kamatani Masakatsu; November 19, 1997 (age 29) Matsudo, Chiba, Japan
- Height: 1.89 m (6 ft 2 1/2 in)
- Weight: 178 kg (392 lb; 28.0 st)

Sport
- Sport: Sumo
- Rank: Ōzeki
- Heya: Sadogatake
- Debut: November 2015
- Highest rank: Ōzeki (March 2024)
- Championships: 1 (Makuuchi); 1 (Jonokuchi)
- Special Prizes: 5 (Fighting Spirit); 1 (Technique)
- Updated on 1 May 2025

Kotozakura Masakatsu (Japanese: 琴櫻 将傑; born 19 November 1997 as Masakatsu Kamatani (鎌谷 将且, Kamatani Masakatsu)) is a Japanese professional sumo wrestler from Matsudo. He wrestles for Sadogatake stable, a sumo stable previously run by his grandfather, former yokozuna Kotozakura, and currently run by his father, former sekiwake Kotonowaka. He made his debut in November 2015 and reached the top makuuchi division in March 2020, reaching the san'yaku ranks in January 2023. His highest rank has been ōzeki. He has won one championship in the top division and five special prizes for Fighting Spirit, as well as one Technique prize.

Long before his professional debut, Kotozakura's goal was to follow in his grandfather's footsteps and inherit his ring name if he was ever promoted to the rank of ōzeki, something he had been repeating regularly since his promotion to sekitori status. Following his ōzeki promotion at the end of the January 2024 tournament, he said that he planned to inherit the Kotozakura name starting in May 2024. Prior to taking the Kotozakura name, he was known professionally as Kotonowaka Masahiro (琴ノ若 傑太).

== Early life ==
Kamatani was born on November 19, 1997, the only child of then-active top division wrestler Kotonowaka I and Machiko Kamatani, the eldest daughter of sumo's 53rd yokozuna Kotozakura. Kotonowaka had married the daughter of his stablemaster the previous year, an old custom in the sumo world to secure the ownership of a stable. During his youth, Kamatani made a habit of attending Sadogatake stable's training sessions every day before going to school. During his childhood he had a good relationship with Kotoyūki, the latter seeing him as a little brother. He had a good relationship with his grandfather, who taught him basic sumo elements (such as shiko or using a teppo pole) and expected him to be a sumo wrestler in order to continue his legacy. Shortly before Kotozakura died, Kamatani–who was still in third grade of elementary school–promised him that he would inherit his ring name if he was promoted to the rank of ōzeki. In November 2005 when Kamatani was in the second year of elementary school his father retired and took over the running of Sadogatake stable. Kamatani was in the Fukuoka International Center to witness his father's final bout, and his father told him to one day inherit the Kotonowaka ring name.

As a student, he decided to enter Saitama Sakae High School (well-known for its sumo club) where he also trained with future professional wrestlers Ōhō and Gōnoyama, both his juniors. In 2013, Kamatani participated to the Hakuhō Cup and came third in the junior high school individual competition. Initially, he thought about joining professional sumo after graduating from junior high school, but as he did not have the confidence to do so, he postponed his decision to become a professional wrestler until his graduation from senior high school. Despite his podium at the Hakuhō Cup, it was noted that Kamatani struggled to gain momentum during his student years, achieving little success at first. In his third year, he was named captain of the sumo club and won both the team competition at the National High School Comprehensive Athletics Sumo Tournament and the World Junior Sumo Championship heavyweight competition, held that year in Osaka.

After graduating from senior high school, he decided to become a professional sumo wrestler and logically joined the Sadogatake stable, where his mother and father announced that he would now be treated like any other wrestler, and ōzeki Kotoshōgiku announced that he would receive no special treatment.

== Early career ==
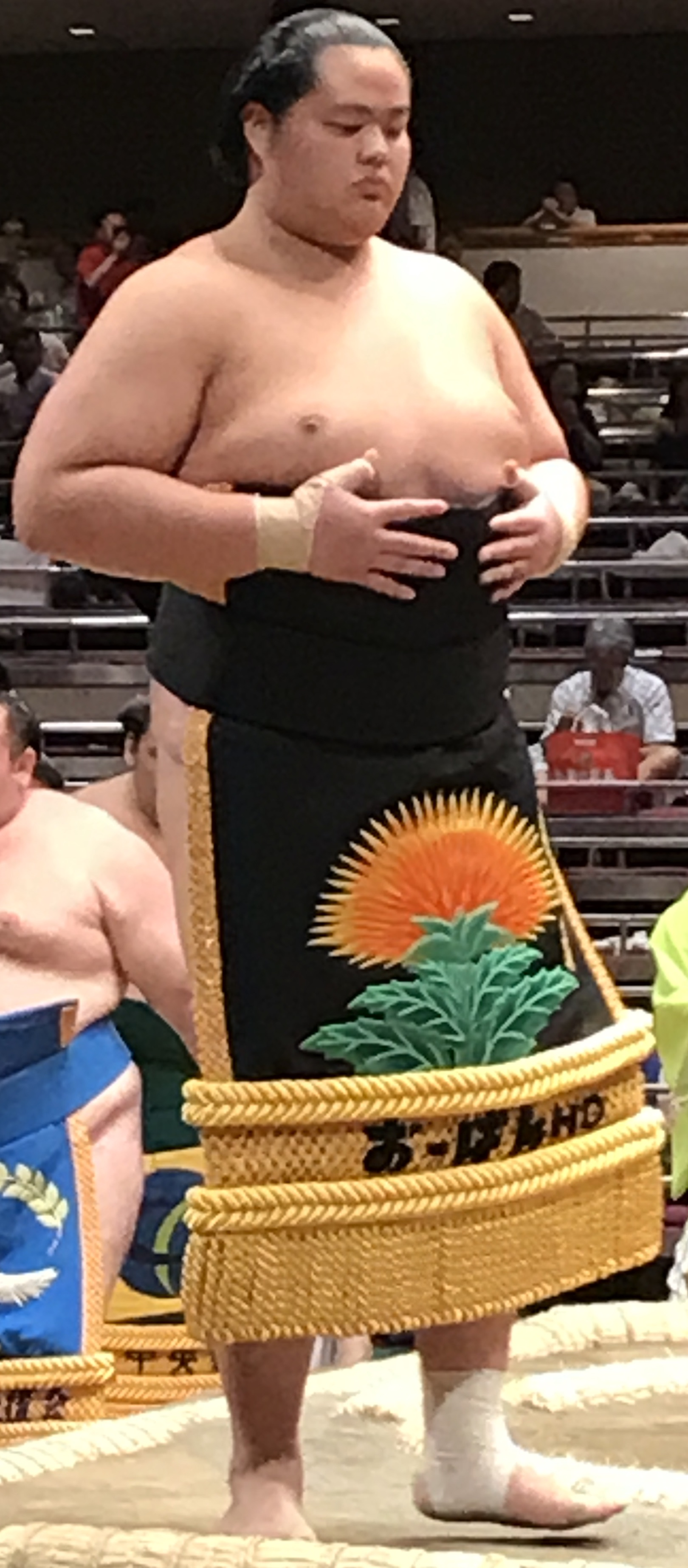
Kotonowaka in September 2019

Kamatani made his professional sumo debut in November 2015 and was given the shikona, or ring name, Kotokamatani Masakatsu (琴鎌谷 将且), taking up his original name combined with the kanji koto (琴) used by all the wrestlers in his stable and using the first name his grandfather used when he was a wrestler. During his presentation ceremony with the other new wrestlers, Kotokamatani used the keshō-mawashi that his father had used on his last day as an active wrestler.

Kotokamatani won all three of his maezumō bouts in November 2015. In the following tournament, in January 2016, he won the jonokuchi championship with a perfect 7–0 record. Moving up in the rankings, Kotokamatani made it to the makushita division in September 2016, hitting the wall of that division and stagnating for a while. In May 2019, in a position of potential promotion to the jūryō division, Kotokamatani recorded a 4–3 record at makushita 2, including a victory over Hōshōryū and narrowly completed with a win over Churanoumi, that was enough to earn promotion to the status of sekitori for the first time.

Upon promotion, he adopted his father's shikona surname of Kotonowaka (琴ノ若), with the expectation that he would eventually adopt his grandfather's shikona of Kotozakura if ever promoted to ōzeki. He also changed his shikona first name by keeping a character from his grandfather's shikona (傑, meaning 'outstanding') and adding the kanji 太 (meaning 'big' or 'thick').

With four straight kachi-koshi or winning records in the jūryō division, Kotonowaka was promoted to the top makuuchi division in March 2020. They were the ninth father-and-son pairing to both reach the top division. Kotonowaka was ranked at maegashira 18, the first time since 1959 that maegashira had extended to an 18th rank. He secured a winning record on the 14th day of the tournament, having suffered four straight losses, and finished on 9–6. The next tournament to take place in July 2020 saw him pull out with a knee injury on Day 8, which he sustained the previous day in a loss to Kaisei. He re-entered on Day 14 but was unable to add any more wins, finishing on 4–6–5 which saw him demoted back to jūryō. He earned immediate promotion back to makuuchi for the November 2020 tournament with a 9–6 record (although he lost his last four matches).

== Makuuchi ==
=== Up-and-comer ===
Upon his return to makuuchi Kotonowaka only managed a 7–8 record (this time losing his last three matches) although it was enough to keep him in the top division as he fell just one place from maegashira 14 to 15. He performed better in the January 2021 tournament, scoring 10–5. He narrowly failed to get a majority of wins in the March and May 2021 tournaments, scoring 6–9 and 7–8 respectively.

In the July 2021 tournament Kotonowaka had his best career performance to date. He scored 12–3 and was awarded his first special prize, for Fighting Spirit. He moved up to maegashira 3 for the September tournament. On the eighth day of the September tournament he defeated ōzeki Shōdai. However, he had to withdraw from the tournament with a left knee injury on Day 10. This injury, to the medial collateral ligament and medial meniscus of his left knee, could have cost him a year's absence from the ring had he opted for surgery. However, Kotonowaka decided to opt for regenerative surgery and obtained mixed results at the following tournaments as a result of his therapy.

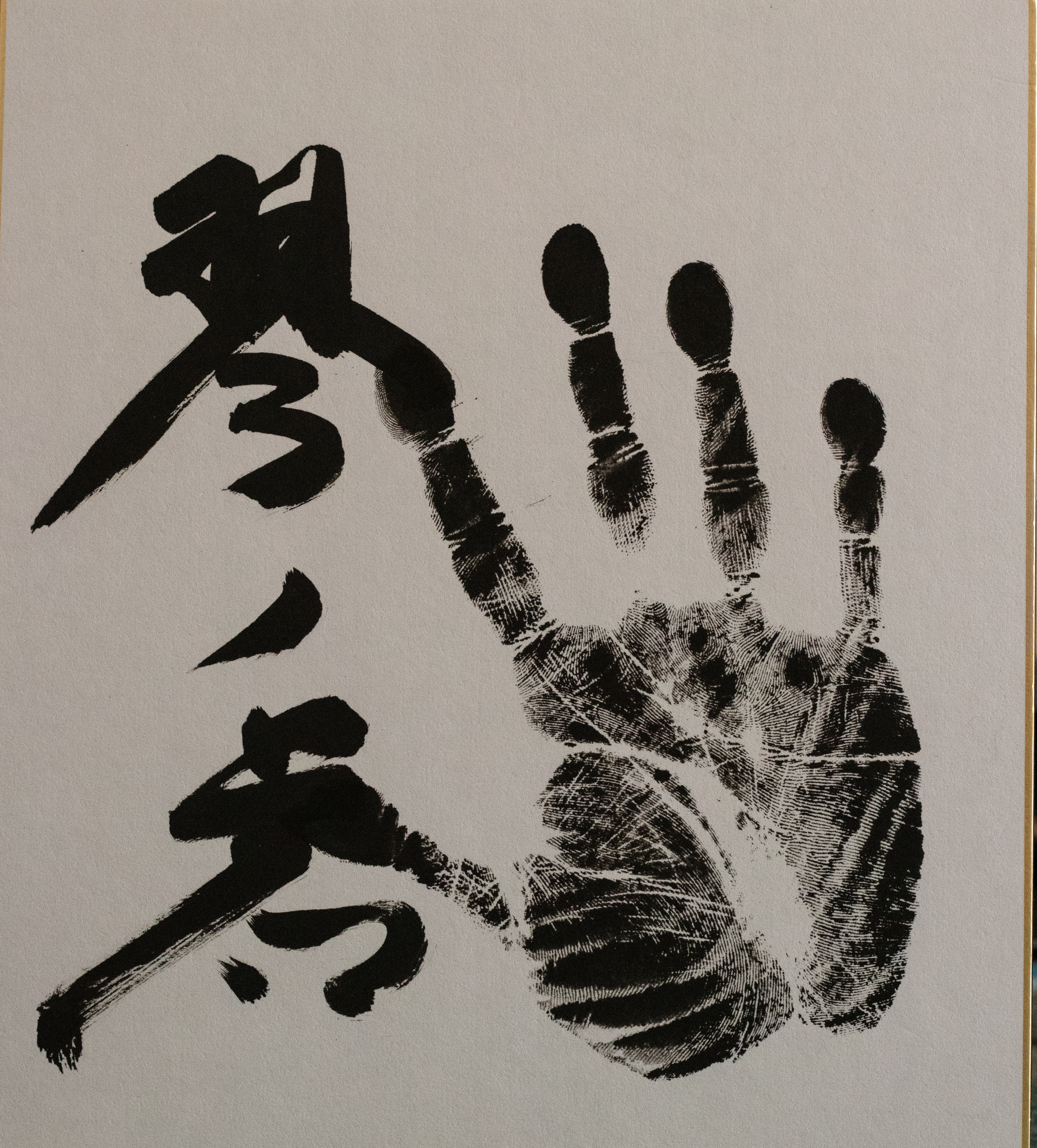
Kotonowaka tegata (handprint and signature)

In January 2022 Kotonowaka won eleven matches from maegashira 14, and was awarded the Fighting Spirit prize for the second time. In March Kotonowaka was in contention for the championship on the final day for the second straight tournament, but lost to Hōshōryū when victory would have given him a chance of a playoff with the other two contenders, Wakatakakage and Takayasu. He finished in third place with 11–4, but did receive his third Fighting Spirit prize. In the May 2022 tournament he reached maegashira 2.

=== San'yaku promotion ===
After a 9–6 winning record at his highest rank of maegashira 1, Kotonowaka was promoted to komusubi for the January 2023 tournament. This promotion makes Kotozakura, Kotonowaka, and the new Kotonowaka the first wrestling family to produce three consecutive san'yaku-ranked wrestlers in sumo history. This promotion also makes the Kotonowaka the sixth father-son pair to be promoted to san'yaku and the first since Oginohana Masaaki and Oginishiki Yasutoshi at the Nagoya tournament in 1997. At the January tournament he secured an 8–7 record on the final day with a win over Hokutofuji. Kotonowaka lost his first four bouts of the tournament, but rallied to get a winning record which included a win over eventual championship winner Ōzeki Takakeishō. He retained his komusubi rankings for the March tournament.

In the March tournament Kotonowaka secured a 9–6 record, which included a win over eventual championship winner Sekiwake Kiribayama. During the July tournament of the same year, Kotonowaka scored several significant victories, including against former ōzeki Mitakeumi and Shōdai, as well as ōzeki promotion seekers, Daieishō. On Day 7, he even defeated one of the tournament leaders, Maegashira Nishikigi, ending his streak of 14 straight wins. On the tenth day, Kotonowaka inflicted defeat on another ōzeki rank contender, Sekiwake Hōshōryū. This victory was particularly significant for Kotonowaka, who had only beaten Hōshōryū once in eleven matches since the two joined the makuuchi division. In a letter to the editor published in Sankei Sports, former ōzeki Musōyama commented with satisfaction on Kotonowaka's wrestling style, deeming it worthy of the rank of ōzeki. For his performances during the tournament, Kotonowaka was promised a fourth sanshō award for Fighting Spirit, which was nonetheless conditional on an eleventh victory. On the final day of the tournament, Kotonowaka won his match against Ryūden and was awarded the prize. Since he achieved double figures in a san'yaku rank, and was the first in this category to reach 10 wins during the July tournament, Kotonowaka commented on his satisfaction at having seriously strengthened his case for promotion to the rank of sekiwake, the highest rank held by his father and master (former sekiwake Kotonowaka Terumasa) after having stagnated at the rank of komusubi for 4 consecutive tournaments. He also commented on his ambition to be promoted to ōzeki, in order to revive and inherit the shikona, or ring name, of his maternal grandfather, former yokozuna Kotozakura, to whom he had made this promise.

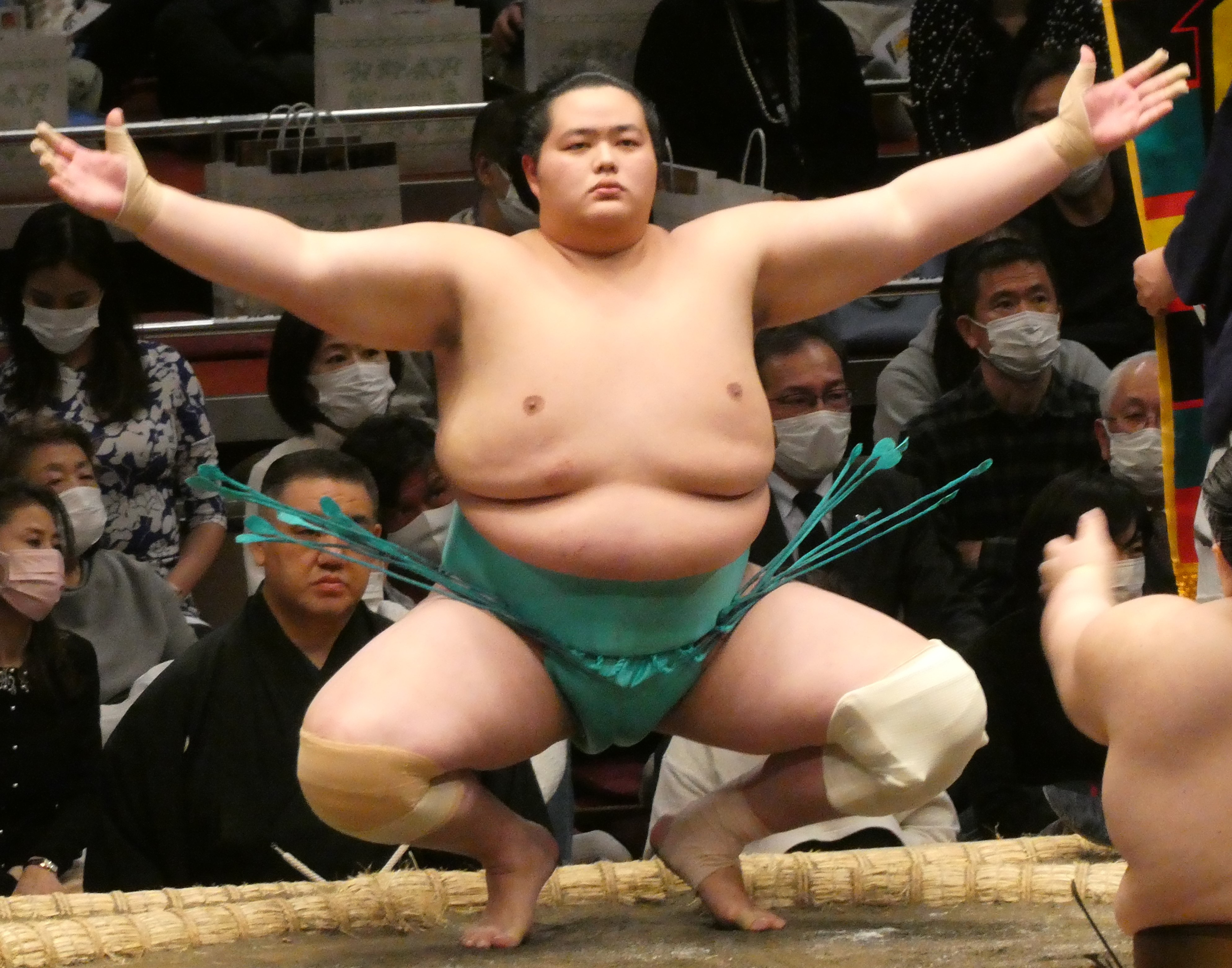
Kotonowaka during the 2022 January tournament

Kotonowaka's promotion to sekiwake was made official with the release of the September tournament rankings on 28 August 2023. He became Sadogatake stable's first sekiwake since Kotoyūki was promoted in May 2016. Upon his promotion, Kotonowaka said he was honored to be at the same ranking as his father, while his father and stablemaster said that the rank was not the end, adding his hopes that someday his son would be on par with Kotozakura. Since Kotonowaka has obtained a solid base to start a run towards the rank of ōzeki, it was announced before the September tournament that his matches would be sponsored by the management and entertainment company LDH.

During the November 2023 tournament, Kotonowaka made his mark with a third consecutive victory on the third day of the championship, using the rare kimarite ōsakate ('backward twisting overarm throw'); a technique that had not been used in the makuuchi division for 13 years. He continued his tournament with a good performance, recording a kachi-koshi winning record on Day 10 for the eighth tournament in a row. On the thirteenth day of the tournament Kotonowaka recorded a fourth defeat against Ryūden, automatically eliminating him from the title race and ended his hopes of promotion to ōzeki at the end of the tournament. Despite having been knocked out of the title race, Kotonowaka played a part in the final outcome of the tournament with a victory over Atamifuji, who needed a win to possibly trigger a playoff for the championship. As this victory was a prerequisite for the Fighting Spirit award, Kotonowaka won the prize for the fifth time in his career. Kotonowaka finished 2023 with winning records at the san'yaku ranks in all six of his tournaments. His father Sadogatake, speaking as the head of the Sumo Association's judging department, added that ōzeki promotion is at stake for Kotonowaka at the tournament in January 2024.

Kotonowaka performed well in the first half of the tournament, although he also recorded a defeat on Day 6 against Wakamotoharu. Kotonowaka maintained his position as one of the tournament's leading wrestlers (with Ōnosato and Ōnoshō) by recording a kachi-koshi on Day 9 against fellow sekiwake Daieishō, securing an eighth consecutive tournament in the ranks of san'yaku. On the tenth day, Kotonowaka faced and defeated Ōnosato by yorikiri, hence taking sole lead of the tournament. On Day 13, however, he suffered a defeat from Terunofuji, reportedly leaving him in a state of extreme frustration after the match and placing him ex-aequo with the yokozuna and Ōzeki Kirishima for the title race. However, he managed to bounce back the following day by inflicting defeat on yokozuna promotion-seeking Kirishima, with the title to be decided on the final day. On senshūraku it was announced that Kotonowaka was awarded the Technique Prize for his performances during the tournament. In addition, he won his final match against Tobizaru, claiming a thirteenth victory necessary to reach the milestone traditionally required for promotion to the rank of ōzeki (33 victories in 3 tournaments). With this victory he also qualified for a playoff against Yokozuna Terunofuji to claim both his first championship and the Outstanding Performance award. However, he lost the championship playoff against Terunofuji, thereby missing both of them. After the tournament, a disappointed and tearful Kotonowaka was nevertheless praised by Terunofuji when the latter gave the traditional post-victory public interview, saying he hoped Kotonowaka would rise to the supreme rank of yokozuna.

=== Promotion to ōzeki ===
Immediately after the end of the January 2024 tournament it was announced that the Judging Department of the Sumo Association (led by Kotonowaka's father Sadogatake) had submitted a request to Chairman Hakkaku to promote Kotonowaka to the rank of ōzeki. It was reported after the tournament that Kotonowaka was expected to keep his shikona (ring name) for a while to honor his father, whose highest rank in competition was sekiwake, before adopting the name of his late yokozuna grandfather Kotozakura.

The Sumo Association approved Kotonowaka's promotion on 31 January 2024, making him the first ōzeki from Chiba Prefecture since the promotion of Matsunobori after the Autumn tournament in 1955. Director Hanakago (former sekiwake Daijuyama) officially delivered the news to the new ōzeki along with Naruto (former ōzeki Kotoōshū), a sumo judge who had competed professionally as a member of Sadogatake stable. In his customary acceptance speech, Kotonowaka said: "With a feeling of gratitude I will devote myself to the way of sumo in order to live up to the title of ōzeki." He also confirmed that he would retain the Kotonowaka name for the next tournament in March, before changing to Kotozakura on the May 2024 banzuke. His father Sadogatake shared his expectations that his son would ultimately reach sumo's top rank of yokozuna, saying that he had "one more step to climb."

During the March tournament, Kotonowaka remained in a position of potential contention for a championship win until Day 13, when he was defeated by fellow-ōzeki Takakeishō, ending his chances of winning the tournament. On day 14, he nevertheless took away his chances of winning the tournament from fellow-ōzeki Hōshōryū by beating him by yoritaoshi (frontal crush out).

==== Kotozakura legacy ====
After the conclusion of the March tournament Kotonowaka, who secured 10 wins in his ōzeki debut, submitted his official paperwork to change his ring name to Kotozakura starting in May. The name change became official on the banzuke for the May tournament, making the new Kotozakura the first wrestler to bear this name in 50 years. Interestingly, the name change was published on the banzuke on 30 April 2024 as Kotozakura Masakatsu (琴櫻 将傑), changing the spelling of the first name borne by his grandfather (琴櫻 傑將) by reversing its kanji with the same pronunciation. The new Kotozakura explained his choice by declaring that the current form of his first name inspired good omens.

Having practiced writing his new shikona to make autographs, however, Kotozakura declared that dedicating the kanji for Kotozakura (琴櫻) was too complicated. Although he had made the choice to keep the traditional kanji for cherry blossom (櫻) in his name, he would dedicate with the simplified kanji (桜) for simplicity, which his grandfather had also chosen to do.

=== First top-division championship and yokozuna race ===
During the 2024 November tournament, Kotozakura and two other ōzeki were the top wrestlers competing with the withdrawal of yokozuna Terunofuji. Kotozakura won 13 of his first 14 matches and entered the final day of top-division competition to face fellow ōzeki Hōshōryū, who also had 13 wins. In the final and deciding match Kotozakura countered Hōshōryū's overarm throw attempt, winning by hatakikomi (slap down) to take his first career Emperor's Cup and second overall professional sumo championship. By coincidence, Kotozakura won his first top-division title in his fifth tournament as an ōzeki at 27 years of age, the same as his late grandfather Kotozakura I, who won under the exact same circumstances in July 1968. Commenting on his first Emperor's Cup, Kotozakura said: "I had experienced losses, but I was able to persevere and became convinced that I really could grab the championship," adding that he could not remember how the deciding match went because he was concentrating so much. Following the tournament, the Sumo Association stated that Kotozakura would be a candidate for yokozuna promotion at the following tournament in January 2025. Since Hōshōryū had also been designated by the Yokozuna Deliberation Council as an official candidate for the sport's supreme rank in the event of a championship victory, Kotozakura and Hōshōryū are the first two wrestlers in 55 years to be considered for promotion at the same time, since Kitanofuji and Tamanoumi in 1970. Kotozakura also finished 2024 with 66 wins, the most of any wrestler in the top division.

Kotozakura's bid for yokozuna promotion at the January 2025 tournament ended early, with the ōzeki losing five straight matches from the second day. On Day 13 he lost to then-tournament leader Kinbōzan for his eighth defeat, which meant that the former yokozuna candidate would need a winning record at the next tournament to retain his ōzeki rank.

In February Kotozakura made visits to nearby Tokitsukaze stable for training sessions, in what was reported to be a rare move for him to do prior to the release of the March tournament rankings.

Although Kotozakura was able to earn kachi-koshi records to get rid of his kadoban status, he had been unable to reproduce strong scores since winning his first makuuchi championship in 2024. He also expressed his frustration at having failed to conquer the highest rank in professional sumo earlier that year, consecutively losing the title race to Hōshōryū and Ōnosato. As member of the Nishonoseki clan, Kotozakura even took part in the ceremonies related to Ōnosato's promotion.

Near the end of the September 2025 tournament Kotozakura withdrew due to right knee ligament damage, according to his medical certificate, which stated that he would need three weeks of recovery time. Though Kotozakura had already secured a winning record in the tournament, his withdrawal was the fourth in his career, and his first at the ōzeki rank.

At the March 2026 tournament, Kotozakura stood out for defeating Yokozuna Hōshōryū on Day 14, eliminating the Yokozuna from the championship race. The next day, he defeated sekiwake Kirishima, who had secured the tournament championship the previous day. This meant that Kotozakura finished the tournament with a 10–5 record, the first time he had ended with double-digit victories since he won the championship in November 2024.

=== Rank continuity at ōzeki ===
Kotozakura had a poor start to the May 2026 tournament, suffering a losing record on Day 11 with a loss to former ōzeki Shōdai. This ensured that Kotozakura would be kadoban in the July 2026 tournament, which would be the second time in his career that he was kadoban. He withdrew from the tournament on Day 12 with just three wins, citing a lower-back injury sustained before the tournament. This meant that, of the 5 yokozuna and ōzeki, Kirishima was the only wrestler from the top two ranks left competing. This was Kotozakura's 5th withdrawal of his career and his second as an ōzeki.

In June, Kotozakura was part of the delegation of makuuchi wrestlers who traveled to Paris to participate in a two-day exhibition tournament. After winning the first part of the competition, Kotozakura also prevailed in the final on the second day by defeating yokozuna Hōshōryū, thereby winning the tournament.

Facing the second kadoban situation of his career at the July 2026 tournament, Kotozakura had a mixed start to the tournament, posting a 4–5 record by the ninth day with the situation reportedly leaving him very frustrated. Kotozakura then suffered three consecutive losses but eventually made a comeback, recording his eighth victory and securing his rank when he defeated Shishi on Day 13.

== Fighting style ==
Kotozakura prefers a migi-yotsu grip on his opponent's mawashi which is a left hand outside, right hand inside position. He also lists oshi/tsuki (pushing/thrusting) as a favourite style in his Japan Sumo Association profile. Apart from yorikiri and oshidashi (force out and push out), his most common winning kimarite include uwatenage ('overarm throw'), tsukiotoshi ('thrust over') and uwatedashinage ('pulling overarm throw'). Kotozakura seeks to emulate the style of his grandfather, the former yokozuna of the same name, and frequently watches his matches to draw inspiration from his thrusting style (tsuki/oshi) as well as his father's grip fighting style (yotsu).

Kotozakura's fighting style, which allows him to stretch to nullify his opponents' strength, has been compared by former yokozuna Hakuhō and Wakanohana III to that of a mochi, a rice cake that is elastic when fresh.

== Career record ==
Kotozakura Masakatsu
Year	January Hatsu basho, Tokyo	March Haru basho, Osaka	May Natsu basho, Tokyo	July Nagoya basho, Nagoya	September Aki basho, Tokyo	November Kyūshū basho, Fukuoka
2015	x	x	x	x	x	(Maezumō)
2016	East Jonokuchi #20; 7–0; Champion	East Jonidan #10; 6–1	East Sandanme #49; 5–2	West Sandanme #24; 5–2	West Makushita #59; 5–2	East Makushita #43; 3–4
2017	East Makushita #50; 3–4	West Sandanme #3; 5–2	East Makushita #46; 4–3	West Makushita #36; 2–5	West Makushita #53; 4–3	East Makushita #45; 5–2
2018	West Makushita #27; 3–4	West Makushita #36; 4–3	East Makushita #28; 4–3	East Makushita #19; 4–3	East Makushita #15; 4–3	East Makushita #9; 3–4
2019	East Makushita #14; 5–2	West Makushita #5; 5–2	East Makushita #2; 4–3	West Jūryō #14; 8–7	East Jūryō #11; 9–6	West Jūryō #7; 10–5
2020	East Jūryō #2; 8–7	East Maegashira #18; 9–6	West Maegashira #13; Tournament Cancelled; State of Emergency; 0–0–0	West Maegashira #13; 4–6–5	West Jūryō #2; 9–6	West Maegashira #14; 7–8
2021	West Maegashira #15; 10–5	East Maegashira #8; 6–9	East Maegashira #11; 7–8	West Maegashira #11; 12–3; F	West Maegashira #3; 3–7–5	East Maegashira #11; 6–9
2022	East Maegashira #14; 11–4; F	West Maegashira #6; 11–4; F	West Maegashira #2; 9–6	East Maegashira #2; 7–4–4	East Maegashira #2; 8–7	West Maegashira #1; 9–6
2023	West Komusubi #1; 8–7	West Komusubi #1; 9–6	East Komusubi #1; 8–7	East Komusubi #1; 11–4; F	East Sekiwake #2; 9–6	East Sekiwake #2; 11–4; F
2024	East Sekiwake #1; 13–2–P; T	West Ōzeki #2; 10–5	West Ōzeki #1; 11–4	East Ōzeki #1; 10–5	East Ōzeki #1; 8–7	East Ōzeki #1; 14–1
2025	East Ōzeki #1; 5–10	West Ōzeki #1; 8–7	West Ōzeki #1; 8–7	East Ōzeki #1; 8–7	East Ōzeki #1; 9–5–1	East Ōzeki #1; 8–7
2026	East Ōzeki #1; 8–7	West Ōzeki #1; 10–5	East Ōzeki #1; 3–9–3	West Ōzeki #1; 8–7	West Ōzeki #1; 9–6	West Ōzeki #1; 8–7
Record given as wins–losses–absences Top division champion Top division runner-up Retired Non-participation Jūryō Lower divisions Sanshō key: F=Fighting spirit; O=Outstanding performance; T=Technique Also shown: ★=Kinboshi; P=Playoff(s); Divisions: Makuuchi — Jūryō — Makushita — Sandanme — Jonidan — Jonokuchi Makuuchi ranks: Yokozuna — Ōzeki — Sekiwake — Komusubi — Maegashira

== See also ==
- Glossary of sumo terms
- List of active sumo wrestlers
- List of sumo record holders
- List of active special prize winners
- List of sumo top division champions
- List of sumo top division runners-up
- List of ōzeki
