= Gōnoyama Tōki =

Japanese sumo wrestler

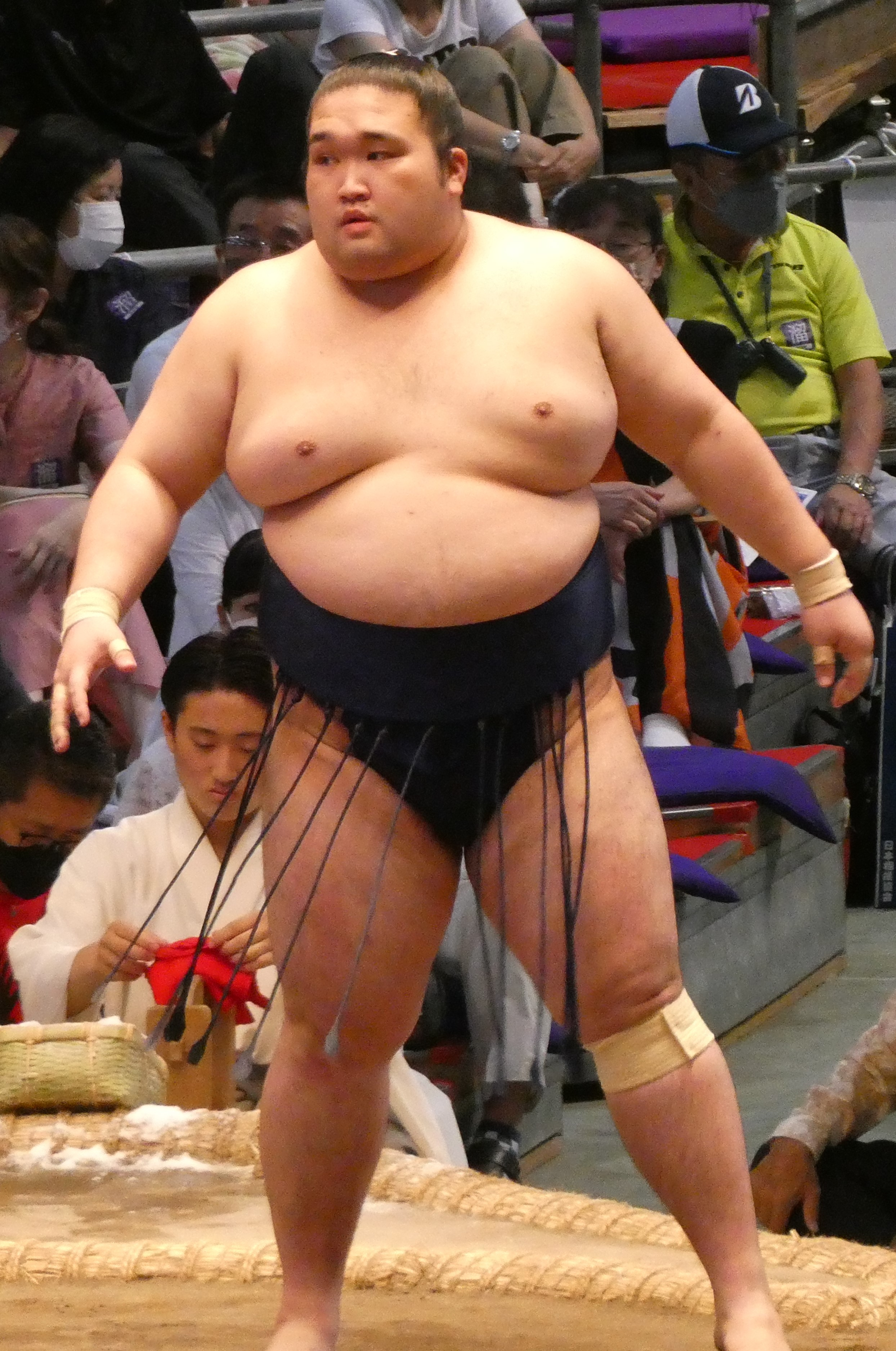

Personal information
- Native name: 豪ノ山 登輝
- Born: Tōki Nishikawa; April 7, 1998 (age 28) Neyagawa, Osaka; Japan
- Height: 1.78 m (5 ft 10 in)
- Weight: 156 kg (344 lb; 24.6 st)

Sport
- Sport: Sumo
- Rank: see below
- University team: Chuo University
- Heya: Sakaigawa → Takekuma
- Debut: March, 2021
- Highest rank: Maegashira 2 (May, 2024)
- Championships: 1 (Jūryō); 1 (Makushita)
- Special Prizes: Fighting Sprit (1)
- Gold Stars: 1 Ōnosato
- Updated on July 15, 2026

Gōnoyama Tōki (Japanese: 豪ノ山 登輝; born April 7, 1998 as Tōki Nishikawa (西川 登輝, Nishikawa Tōki)) is a Japanese professional sumo wrestler from Neyagawa, Osaka. Wrestling for Takekuma stable, he made his professional debut in March 2021. He reached the second-highest jūryō division in July 2022, and has won one championship in both makushita and jūryō. He was promoted to the top makuuchi division in July 2023. His highest rank has been maegashira 2.

== Early life and sumo background ==
Gōnoyama started sumo by chance in kindergarten because his parents wanted him to play a sport. While at Keimei Elementary School in Neyagawa, Osaka, he participated for three consecutive years in the Wanpaku Sumo Tournament and the All Japan Elementary School Sumo Championship. During that time he particularly enjoyed a visit to Sakaigawa stable. At that time, the wrestlers he admired the most were Toyohibiki and Gōeidō. Takakeishō, two years his senior, also played a big role in his ambition to one day turn professional by helping him, when they were both children, to train. When in elementary school, Gōnoyama was also trained by Ura, who was a 6th grade senior in the same prefectural sumo federation. Gōnoyama attended Neyagawa Shiritsu Daikyu Junior High School, then followed Takakeishō to Saitama Sakae High School where he also trained with future professional wrestlers Ōhō, his one-year junior, and Kotonowaka, his senior. Gōnoyama then graduated Chuo University's Faculty of Law. By his fourth year, he was captain of his university's sumo club and he also finished runner-up at the National Student Championships. After graduating from college, Gōnoyama opted to turn pro and joined Sakaigawa stable.

== Early life and career ==
=== Sumo beginnings ===
He made his professional debut in March 2021 as a deshi of fellow Neyagawa native and former ōzeki Gōeidō. Due to his amateur achievements, Gōnoyama was allowed to enter professional sumo at the rank of sandanme tsukedashi, alongside fellow collegiate standout and Chu-Dai teammate Tochimusashi. At that time he was fighting under his legal name Nishikawa Tōki. In his first tournament, Gōnoyama remained undefeated until his final match, including with a win over Tochimusashi however, he failed to claim the championship after losing to Fukushima by disqualification as he had pulled his topknot. He then followed with another strong 6-1 record and was promoted to makushita in July 2021. In November 2021, Gōnoyama withdrew from the tournament due to a neck injury and was demoted to makushita 35 in January 2022. In his return, Gōnoyama defeated former komusubi Ryūden on the final day to win the makushita championship with a perfect 7–0 record. In February 2022, he transferred to the recently opened Takekuma stable, founded by former ōzeki Gōeidō. He followed this with two 4-3 records and was promoted to jūryō in July 2022.

=== Jūryō career ===
Upon his promotion to jūryō, he was given the new shikona, or ring name, Gōnoyama (豪ノ山) inspired by the first kanji from his master's own ring name. During his first tournament, he finished with an 8-7 record. During the March 2023 tournament, Gōnoyama achieved 11 wins and inflicted his only defeat on Ichinojō, the jūryō champion. In the following tournament, Gōnoyama won the jūryō tournament championship with a score of 14–1. The championship was notably decided on the fifteenth day, when Gōnoyama and Ochiai faced each other in a playoff. Gōnoyama inflicted for the second time in the tournament a defeat on Ochiai, whom he had already beaten on Day 11, and subsequently claimed the second division title. This championship win was also the first time since 1949 that the second-division title was decided in a playoff between two wrestlers with 14 wins. In post-championship interviews, Gōnoyama confided that throughout the tournament he had been preparing to come second. He also praised maegashira Ōhō for helping him train and prepare for the makuuchi division level.

== Makuuchi ==
Gōnoyama was promoted to the top makuuchi division for the July 2023 tournament, listed at the rank of east maegashira 13. Upon his promotion, he said in a press conference that he wanted to win at least ten matches and win a special prize at the upcoming tournament. Gōnoyama made a good start to the tournament and recorded five straight wins before being defeated by Ochiai (now renamed Hakuōhō) on Day 6. Following this defeat he suffered three consecutive defeats but bounced back at the end of his tournament to achieve a positive record (kachi-koshi). Having also scored a ninth win against Takanoshō, Gōnoyama was listed as a potential recipient of the Fighting Spirit special prize, which was conditional on a tenth win. On the final day of the tournament, Gōnoyama defeated Tamawashi and won the award.

Gōnoyama finished the September 2023 tournament with nine wins. At the November 2023 tournament Gōnoyama scored back-to-back upset wins by defeating two of the then-three ōzeki competitors. On Day 6 he defeated Kirishima, and the next day he beat childhood friend and yokozuna promotion-seeker Takakeishō for the first time. On the subject of his recent victories, former yokozuna Wakanohana III commented in his daily column that Gōnoyama had put on the perfect match and that he expected the young wrestler to reach the san'yaku ranks in 2024.

During the January 2024 tournament, Gōnoyama notably scored a dominant victory over ōzeki Hōshōryū, inspiring a comment from Tatsutagawa (the former Hōmashō), who saw this victory as a revival of the style of former ōzeki Dejima, who was also known for his dominance during the tachi-ai. During the March tournament of the same year, he recorded two wins by default following the withdrawal of his Oitekaze stable opponents Tsurugishō (Day 5) and Tobizaru (Day 10). At the May 2024 tournament, Gōnoyama stood out by inflicting defeat on ōzeki Kirishima.

On the fourth day of the July 2026 tournament, Gōnoyama defeated yokozuna Ōnosato, earning the first kinboshi of his career.

== Fighting style ==
Gōnoyama is a tsuki and oshi specialist, which means he relies on thrusting and pushing techniques to defeat his opponents rather than belt-wrestling. By far the most common of his winning techniques is oshidashi which accounts for 42% of his wins. His style was compared by his master Gōeido to that of former ōzeki Dejima Takeharu.

== Personal life ==
In April 2024 Gōnoyama married a woman who was his classmate and a member of the judo club at Saitama Sakae High School after a one-year relationship.

== Career record ==
Gōnoyama Tōki
Year	January Hatsu basho, Tokyo	March Haru basho, Osaka	May Natsu basho, Tokyo	July Nagoya basho, Nagoya	September Aki basho, Tokyo	November Kyūshū basho, Fukuoka
2021	x	Sandanme tsukedashi #100; 6–1	East Sandanme #39; 6–1	West Makushita #52; 5–2	East Makushita #36; 5–2	West Makushita #21; 2–3–2
2022	East Makushita #35; 7–0; Champion	East Makushita #3; 4–3	West Makushita #1; 4–3	West Jūryō #14; 8–7	East Jūryō #12; 6–9	West Jūryō #14; 9–6
2023	East Jūryō #10; 9–6	East Jūryō #6; 11–4	East Jūryō #1; 14–1–P; Champion	East Maegashira #13; 10–5; F	East Maegashira #5; 9–6	East Maegashira #4; 8–7
2024	East Maegashira #3; 5–10	West Maegashira #6; 10–5	West Maegashira #2; 6–9	West Maegashira #3; 5–10	West Maegashira #6; 6–9	West Maegashira #8; 11–4
2025	East Maegashira #3; 8–7	East Maegashira #2; 7–8	West Maegashira #2; 4–11	West Maegashira #6; 9–6	West Maegashira #3; 1–14	East Maegashira #13; 9–6
2026	East Maegashira #9; 7–8	East Maegashira #10; 10–5	West Maegashira #4; 8–7	East Maegashira #2; 7–8 ★	East Maegashira #3; 6–9	West Maegashira #5; 8–7
Record given as wins–losses–absences Top division champion Top division runner-up Retired Non-participation Jūryō Lower divisions Sanshō key: F=Fighting spirit; O=Outstanding performance; T=Technique Also shown: ★=Kinboshi; P=Playoff(s); Divisions: Makuuchi — Jūryō — Makushita — Sandanme — Jonidan — Jonokuchi Makuuchi ranks: Yokozuna — Ōzeki — Sekiwake — Komusubi — Maegashira

== See also ==
- Glossary of sumo terms
- List of active sumo wrestlers
- List of active gold star earners
- List of active special prize winners
- List of sumo second division champions
