= 2021 in sumo =

The following are the events in professional sumo during 2021.

== Tournaments ==
=== January ===
Hatsu basho

Ryōgoku Kokugikan, Tokyo, 10 January – 24 January

2021 Hatsu basho results - Makuuchi Division
W		L		A	East			Rank	West			W		L		A
0	-	0	-	15	ø	(Mongolia)	Hakuhō	Y	ø	(Mongolia)	Kakuryū	0	-	0	-	15
2	-	8	-	5	ø	(Japan)	Takakeishō	O		(Japan)	**Shōdai**	11	-	4	-	0
11	-	4	-	0		(Japan)	**Asanoyama**	O	ø			0	-	0	-	0
11	-	4	-	0		(Mongolia)	**Terunofuji**	S		(Japan)	**Takanoshō**	9	-	6	-	0
9	-	6	-	0		(Japan)	**Takayasu**	K		(Japan)	**Mitakeumi**	9	-	6	-	0
7	-	8	-	0		(Japan)	Hokutofuji	M1		(Japan)	**Daieishō**	13	-	2	-	0
9	-	6	-	0		(Japan)	**Takarafuji**	M2	ø	(Japan)	Wakatakakage	0	-	0	-	15
2	-	13	-	0		(Japan)	Kotoshōhō	M3		(Japan)	**Ōnoshō**	9	-	6	-	0
4	-	11	-	0		(Georgia (country))	Tochinoshin	M4		(Mongolia)	Tamawashi	6	-	9	-	0
7	-	8	-	0		(Japan)	Endō	M5		(Japan)	Okinoumi	7	-	8	-	0
4	-	11	-	0		(Japan)	Ryūden	M6		(Japan)	Kagayaki	6	-	9	-	0
8	-	7	-	0		(Japan)	**Meisei**	M7		(Japan)	Tobizaru	6	-	9	-	0
3	-	12	-	0		(Japan)	Tokushōryū	M8		(Mongolia)	**Kiribayama**	8	-	7	-	0
0	-	0	-	15	ø	(Japan)	Chiyonokuni	M9		(Japan)	**Myōgiryū**	8	-	7	-	0
9	-	6	-	0		(Japan)	**Shimanoumi**	M10		(Bulgaria)	Aoiyama	6	-	9	-	0
0	-	0	-	15	ø	(Japan)	Chiyotairyū	M11		(Japan)	Kotoeko	6	-	9	-	0
9	-	6	-	0		(Mongolia)	**Ichinojō**	M12		(Japan)	Terutsuyoshi	7	-	8	-	0
5	-	10	-	0		(Japan)	Akua	M13	ø	(Mongolia)	Chiyoshōma	0	-	0	-	15
9	-	6	-	0		(Mongolia)	**Hōshōryū**	M14		(Japan)	**Midorifuji**	9	-	6	-	0
7	-	8	-	0		(Japan)	Yutakayama	M15		(Japan)	**Kotonowaka**	10	-	5	-	0
9	-	6	-	0		(Japan)	**Akiseyama**	M16	ø	(Brazil)	Kaisei	0	-	0	-	15
5	-	10	-	0		(Japan)	Sadanoumi	M17	ø			0	-	0	-	0

ø - Indicates a pull-out or absent rank
**winning record in bold**
**Yūshō Winner**

=== March ===
Haru basho

Ryōgoku Kokugikan, Tokyo, 14 March – 28 March

Originally scheduled to take place at Osaka Prefectural Gymnasium, Osaka, the tournament was moved to Tokyo due to the COVID-19 pandemic.

2021 Haru basho results - Makuuchi Division
W		L		A	East			Rank	West			W		L		A
2	-	1	-	12	ø	(Mongolia)	Hakuhō	Y	ø	(Mongolia)	Kakuryū	0	-	0	-	10
7	-	8	-	0		(Japan)	Shōdai	O		(Japan)	**Asanoyama**	10	-	5	-	0
10	-	5	-	0		(Japan)	**Takakeishō**	O	ø			0	-	0	-	0
12	-	3	-	0		(Mongolia)	**Terunofuji**	S		(Japan)	**Takanoshō**	8	-	7	-	0
10	-	5	-	0		(Japan)	**Takayasu**	K		(Japan)	**Mitakeumi**	8	-	7	-	0
0	-	0	-	0	ø			K		(Japan)	**Daieishō**	8	-	7	-	0
3	-	12	-	0		(Japan)	Takarafuji	M1		(Japan)	Ōnoshō	4	-	11	-	0
9	-	6	-	0		(Japan)	**Hokutofuji**	M2		(Japan)	**Wakatakakage**	10	-	5	-	0
10	-	5	-	0		(Japan)	**Meisei**	M3		(Japan)	Shimanoumi	4	-	11	-	0
7	-	8	-	0		(Mongolia)	Kiribayama	M4		(Japan)	Myōgiryū	7	-	8	-	0
5	-	5	-	5	ø	(Japan)	Endō	M5		(Japan)	Okinoumi	3	-	12	-	0
5	-	10	-	0		(Mongolia)	Tamawashi	M6		(Mongolia)	Ichinojō	7	-	8	-	0
7	-	8	-	0		(Georgia (country))	Tochinoshin	M7		(Japan)	Kagayaki	6	-	9	-	0
6	-	9	-	0		(Japan)	Kotonowaka	M8		(Japan)	**Tobizaru**	10	-	5	-	0
8	-	5	-	2	ø	(Japan)	**Chiyonokuni**	M9		(Mongolia)	**Hōshōryū**	8	-	7	-	0
5	-	10	-	0		(Japan)	Midorifuji	M10		(Japan)	Ryūden	6	-	9	-	0
6	-	9	-	0		(Japan)	Chiyotairyū	M11		(Japan)	Kotoshōhō	1	-	6	-	8
7	-	8	-	0		(Japan)	Akiseyama	M12		(Bulgaria)	**Aoiyama**	11	-	4	-	0
8	-	7	-	0		(Japan)	**Terutsuyoshi**	M13		(Mongolia)	**Chiyoshōma**	8	-	7	-	0
8	-	7	-	0		(Japan)	**Kotoeko**	M14		(Japan)	**Tsurugishō**	9	-	6	-	0
4	-	10	-	1	ø	(Japan)	Yutakayama	M15		(Japan)	**Hidenoumi**	10	-	5	-	0
8	-	7	-	0		(Brazil)	**Kaisei**	M16		(Japan)	**Daiamami**	9	-	6	-	0

ø - Indicates a pull-out or absent rank
**winning record in bold**
**Yūshō Winner**

=== May ===
Natsu basho

Ryōgoku Kokugikan, Tokyo, 9 May – 23 May

2021 Natsu basho results - Makuuchi Division
W		L		A	East			Rank	West			W		L		A
0	-	0	-	15	ø	(Mongolia)	Hakuhō	Y	ø			0	-	0	-	0
7	-	5	-	3	ø	(Japan)	Asanoyama	O		(Japan)	**Takakeishō**	12	-	3	-	0
9	-	6	-	0		(Japan)	**Shōdai**	O		(Mongolia)	**Terunofuji***	12	-	3	-	0
10	-	5	-	0		(Japan)	**Takayasu**	S		(Japan)	Takanoshō	5	-	10	-	0
10	-	5	-	0		(Japan)	**Mitakeumi**	K		(Japan)	Daieishō	6	-	9	-	0
9	-	6	-	0		(Japan)	**Wakatakakage**	M1		(Japan)	Hokutōfuji	6	-	9	-	0
8	-	7	-	0		(Japan)	**Meisei**	M2		(Japan)	Tobizaru	5	-	10	-	0
4	-	3	-	8		(Bulgaria)	Aoiyama	M3	ø	(Japan)	Chiyonokuni	0	-	4	-	11
6	-	9	-	0		(Mongolia)	Kiribayama	M4		(Japan)	Myōgiryū	6	-	9	-	0
7	-	8	-	0		(Mongolia)	Hōshōryū	M5		(Japan)	Ōnoshō	7	-	8	-	0
5	-	10	-	0		(Japan)	Hidenoumi	M6		(Mongolia)	**Ichinojō**	9	-	6	-	0
5	-	10	-	0		(Georgia (country))	Tochinoshin	M7		(Japan)	Takarafuji	7	-	8	-	0
4	-	11	-	0		(Japan)	Tsurugishō	M8		(Japan)	**Endō**	11	-	4	-	0
7	-	8	-	0		(Japan)	Shimanoumi	M9		(Japan)	Kagayaki	6	-	9	-	0
7	-	8	-	0		(Mongolia)	Tamawashi	M10		(Japan)	Terutsuyoshi	7	-	8	-	0
7	-	8	-	0		(Japan)	Kotonowaka	M11		(Mongolia)	**Chiyoshōma**	8	-	7	-	0
9	-	6	-	0		(Japan)	**Kotoekō**	M12		(Japan)	**Okinoumi**	9	-	6	-	0
1	-	7	-	7	ø	(Japan)	Akiseyama	M13		(Japan)	Daiamami	7	-	8	-	0
0	-	0	-	15	ø	(Japan)	Ryūden	M14		(Japan)	**Chiyotairyū**	10	-	5	-	0
9	-	6	-	0		(Brazil)	**Kaisei**	M15	ø	(Japan)	Midorifuji	0	-	0	-	15
7	-	8	-	0		(Japan)	Ishiura	M16		(Japan)	**Chiyomaru**	8	-	7	-	0
5	-	10	-	0		(Japan)	Akua	M17	ø			0	-	0	-	0

ø - Indicates a pull-out or absent rank
**winning record in bold**
**Yūshō Winner**
*Won Playoff

=== July ===
Nagoya basho

Aichi Prefectural Gymnasium, Nagoya, 4 July – 18 July

2021 Nagoya basho results - Makuuchi Division
W		L		A	East			Rank	West			W		L		A
15	-	0	-	0		(Mongolia)	**Hakuhō**	Y	ø			0	-	0	-	0
14	-	1	-	0		(Mongolia)	**Terunofuji**	O	ø	(Japan)	Takakeishō	1	-	2	-	12
8	-	7	-	0		(Japan)	**Shōdai**	O	ø	(Japan)	Asanoyama	0	-	0	-	15
7	-	6	-	2		(Japan)	Takayasu	S		(Japan)	**Mitakeumi**	8	-	7	-	0
5	-	10	-	0		(Japan)	Wakatakakage	K		(Japan)	**Meisei**	8	-	7	-	0
1	-	4	-	10	ø	(Japan)	Endō	M1		(Japan)	Daieishō	5	-	10	-	0
8	-	7	-	0		(Japan)	**Takanoshō**	M2		(Mongolia)	**Ichinojō**	10	-	5	-	0
8	-	7	-	0		(Japan)	**Hokutōfuji**	M3		(Japan)	Tobizaru	4	-	11	-	0
2	-	13	-	0		(Japan)	Kotoekō	M4		(Japan)	Chiyotairyū	4	-	11	-	0
5	-	10	-	0		(Japan)	Okinoumi	M5		(Mongolia)	**Hōshōryū**	10	-	5	-	0
7	-	8	-	0		(Japan)	Ōnoshō	M6		(Mongolia)	**Kiribayama**	9	-	6	-	0
5	-	10	-	0		(Japan)	Myōgiryū	M7		(Mongolia)	**Chiyoshōma**	8	-	7	-	0
8	-	7	-	0		(Japan)	**Takarafuji**	M8		(Bulgaria)	Aoiyama	7	-	8	-	0
7	-	8	-	0		(Japan)	Hidenoumi	M9		(Japan)	**Shimanoumi**	8	-	7	-	0
11	-	4	-	0		(Mongolia)	**Tamawashi**	M10		(Japan)	**Terutsuyoshi**	8	-	7	-	0
6	-	9	-	0		(Brazil)	Kaisei	M11		(Japan)	**Kotonowaka**	12	-	3	-	0
7	-	8	-	0		(Georgia (country))	Tochinoshin	M12		(Japan)	Kagayaki	7	-	8	-	0
6	-	9	-	0		(Japan)	Chiyomaru	M13		(Japan)	**Ura**	10	-	5	-	0
4	-	11	-	0		(Japan)	Daiamami	M14		(Japan)	Chiyonoō	7	-	8	-	0
8	-	7	-	0		(Japan)	**Tsurugishō**	M15		(Japan)	Tokushōryū	7	-	8	-	0
7	-	8	-	0		(Japan)	Chiyonokuni	M16		(Japan)	**Ishiura**	9	-	6	-	0
8	-	7	-	0		(Japan)	**Ichiyamamoto**	M17	ø			0	-	0	-	0

ø - Indicates a pull-out or absent rank
**winning record in bold**
**Yūshō Winner**

=== September ===
Aki basho

Ryōgoku Kokugikan, Tokyo, 12 September – 26 September

2021 Aki basho results - Makuuchi Division
W		L		A	East			Rank	West			W		L		A
0	-	0	-	15	ø	(Mongolia)	Hakuhō	Y		(Mongolia)	**Terunofuji**	13	-	2	-	0
8	-	7	-	0		(Japan)	**Shōdai**	O		(Japan)	**Takakeishō**	8	-	7	-	0
9	-	6	-	0		(Japan)	**Mitakeumi**	S		(Japan)	**Meisei**	8	-	7	-	0
0	-	0	-	15	ø	(Japan)	Asanoyama	S	ø			0	-	0	-	0
4	-	8	-	3	ø	(Japan)	Takayasu	K		(Mongolia)	**Ichinojō**	8	-	7	-	0
5	-	8	-	2		(Mongolia)	Hōshōryū	M1		(Japan)	Takanoshō	7	-	8	-	0
2	-	3	-	10	ø	(Japan)	Hokutofuji	M2		(Mongolia)	**Kiribayama**	9	-	6	-	0
9	-	6	-	0		(Japan)	**Wakatakakage**	M3	ø	(Japan)	Kotonowaka	3	-	7	-	5
6	-	9	-	0		(Mongolia)	Tamawashi	M4		(Japan)	**Daieishō**	10	-	5	-	0
5	-	10	-	0		(Mongolia)	Chiyoshōma	M5		(Japan)	**Takarafuji**	8	-	7	-	0
7	-	8	-	0		(Japan)	Ura	M6		(Japan)	**Ōnoshō**	10	-	5	-	0
8	-	7	-	0		(Japan)	**Shimanoumi**	M7		(Japan)	Terutsuyoshi	5	-	10	-	0
10	-	5	-	0		(Japan)	**Okinoumi**	M8		(Japan)	Tobizaru	7	-	8	-	0
7	-	8	-	0		(Bulgaria)	Aoiyama	M9		(Japan)	Hidenoumi	7	-	8	-	0
7	-	8	-	0		(Japan)	Chiyotairyū	M10		(Japan)	**Myōgiryū**	11	-	4	-	0
11	-	4	-	0		(Japan)	**Endō**	M11		(Japan)	**Kotoeko**	8	-	7	-	0
0	-	0	-	15	ø	(Japan)	Ishiura	M12		(Georgia (country))	Tochinoshin	7	-	8	-	0
7	-	8	-	0		(Japan)	Kagayaki	M13		(Japan)	Tsurugishō	5	-	10	-	0
6	-	9	-	0		(Brazil)	Kaisei	M14		(Japan)	**Yutakayama**	8	-	7	-	0
4	-	11	-	0		(Japan)	Ichiyamamoto	M15		(Japan)	Chiyonoō	4	-	11	-	0
8	-	7	-	0		(Japan)	**Chiyomaru**	M16		(Japan)	Tokushōryū	4	-	11	-	0
9	-	6	-	0		(Japan)	**Chiyonokuni**	M17	ø			0	-	0	-	0

ø - Indicates a pull-out or absent rank
**winning record in bold**
**Yusho Winner**

=== November ===
Kyushu basho

Fukuoka Kokusai Center, Kyushu, 14 November – 28 November

2021 Kyushu basho results - Makuuchi Division
W		L		A	East		Rank	West			W		L		A
15	-	0	-	0	(Mongolia)	**Terunofuji**	Y	ø			0	-	0	-	0
9	-	6	-	0	(Japan)	**Shōdai**	O		(Japan)	**Takakeishō**	12	-	3	-	0
11	-	4	-	0	(Japan)	**Mitakeumi**	S		(Japan)	Meisei	7	-	8	-	0
5	-	10	-	0	(Mongolia)	Ichinojō	K		(Mongolia)	Kiribayama	6	-	9	-	0
8	-	7	-	0	(Japan)	**Daieishō**	M1		(Japan)	**Wakatakakage**	8	-	7	-	0
5	-	10	-	0	(Japan)	Ōnoshō	M2		(Japan)	**Takanoshō**	11	-	4	-	0
7	-	8	-	0	(Japan)	Okinoumi	M3		(Japan)	Myōgiryū	2	-	13	-	0
5	-	10	-	0	(Japan)	Takarafuji	M4		(Japan)	**Endō**	8	-	7	-	0
6	-	9	-	0	(Japan)	Takayasu	M5		(Mongolia)	Hōshōryū	7	-	8	-	0
5	-	10	-	0	(Japan)	Shimanoumi	M6		(Mongolia)	**Tamawashi**	9	-	6	-	0
10	-	5	-	0	(Japan)	**Ura**	M7		(Mongolia)	**Chiyoshōma**	8	-	7	-	0
3	-	12	-	0	(Japan)	Kotoekō	M8		(Japan)	Tobizaru	7	-	8	-	0
4	-	11	-	0	(Bulgaria)	Aoiyama	M9		(Japan)	**Hidenoumi**	8	-	7	-	0
6	-	9	-	0	(Japan)	Chiyotairyū	M10	ø	(Japan)	Asanoyama	0	-	0	-	15
6	-	9	-	0	(Japan)	Kotonowaka	M11		(Japan)	Terutsuyoshi	7	-	8	-	0
7	-	8	-	0	(Japan)	Ishiura	M12		(Japan)	**Hokutofuji**	11	-	4	-	0
7	-	8	-	0	(Japan)	Yutakayama	M13		(Georgia (country))	Tochinoshin	6	-	6	-	3
5	-	10	-	0	(Japan)	Kagayaki	M14		(Japan)	**Chiyonokuni**	9	-	6	-	0
8	-	7	-	0	(Japan)	**Chiyomaru**	M15		(Japan)	**Abi**	12	-	3	-	0
9	-	6	-	0	(Japan)	**Akua**	M16		(Japan)	**Sadanoumi**	9	-	6	-	0
7	-	8	-	0	(Brazil)	Kaisei	M17		(Japan)	Shōhōzan	4	-	11	-	0

ø - Indicates a pull-out or absent rank
**winning record in bold**
**Yūshō Winner**

== News ==
=== January ===
- 1: The Japan Sumo Association announces that eleven additional members of Arashio stable have tested positive for COVID-19, including its stablemaster Arashio Oyakata (the former maegashira Sōkokurai), a hairdresser, jūryō wrestler Wakamotoharu and eight wrestlers from the lower divisions. It had been announced the previous day that top division wrestler Wakatakakage tested positive for the virus. It is unclear whether the wrestlers in the stable will be able to compete in the upcoming January 2021 tournament. The Sumo Association said it would issue another warning to association members concerning the virus.
- 5: The Sumo Association announces that yokozuna Hakuhō has tested positive for COVID-19, making it unlikely that he will appear in the January 2021 tournament. He had reported a loss of the sense of smell the day before. The Sumo Association said it would test other members of Miyagino stable that were in close contact with him. It is also announced that because of rising coronavirus infections, ticket sales for the January basho would be stopped on the afternoon of 6 January and there would be no sales of same-day tickets during the tournament.
- 6: It is announced that the COVID test results of the other members of Miyagino stable that were screened have come back negative, but Sumo Association communications director Shibatayama said it was not certain whether those in close contact with Hakuhō would still be permitted to compete in the January 2021 tournament. Shibatayama also said that the Sumo Association was waiting to discuss how they would respond to a new state of emergency expected to be declared for Tokyo and three surrounding prefectures due to rising coronavirus infections.
- 7: The Sumo Association announces it will require COVID testing of all of wrestlers and stablemasters prior to the start of the January 2021 tournament. Shibatayama said the association would decide on the course of action once all of the test results are known. While a state of emergency has been made official for Tokyo and surrounding prefectures, the January basho is expected to proceed with spectators as the new emergency guidelines call for a cap of 5,000 people or 50% capacity at events - limits similar to what had already been in place at the Ryōgoku Kokugikan.
- 8: Yokozuna Kakuryū officially withdraws from the January 2021 tournament due to lower back issues. He had previously been warned by the Yokozuna Deliberation Council over his recent lack of performances as a yokozuna. This was the third consecutive tournament both yokozuna were absent.
- 9: The Sumo Association announces that five wrestlers have tested positive for COVID-19 from the tests mandated on 7 January. The positives include maegashira wrestler Chiyoshōma, jūryō wrestler Chiyoōtori and two lower-ranked wrestlers from Kokonoe stable, as well as one lower-division wrestler from Tomozuna stable. These stables, along with Miyagino stable and Arashio stable, will all withdraw from the January 2021 tournament due to COVID-19 infections. Tournament organizer Oguruma suggested that the basho could be cancelled if there are additional virus infections. Lower division wrestler Kotokantetsu, who had previously undergone heart surgery, retires from sumo after being told by the Sumo Association that fear of getting infected while competing was not sufficient grounds for withdrawal from the tournament.
- 10: The January 2021 tournament opens with 65 wrestlers withdrawn due to either testing positive for COVID-19 or for being in close contact with those who did. The 16 sekitori missing from the first day (15 for COVID-19 reasons, plus Kakuryū) is a postwar record. In his opening speech, Sumo Association chairman Hakkaku apologized for concerns caused by the infection of the wrestlers and said that preventative measures have been implemented.
- 22: Following an incident during the January tournament in which makushita division wrestler Shōnannoumi was allowed to continue with his match despite a clash of heads during a false start that appeared to leave him concussed, the Sumo Association announces that in future there will be no rematch in such circumstances. Previously it had been up to the wrestler to decide if he wanted to continue.
- 24: Maegashira 1 Daieishō claims his first yūshō after defeating Okinoumi on the final day of the January tournament. He defeated all of the san'yaku wrestlers ranked above him in the first week, finishing with a 13-2 record. This marks the sixth straight year that the Emperor's Cup of the January tournament is won by a first-time champion. Asanoyama, Shōdai and Terunofuji share the runner-up position at 11-4. Daieishō receives two of the sanshō prizes: the Outstanding Performance Award and Technique Prize. Technique Prizes are also awarded to Terunofuji and makuuchi newcomer Midorifuji. This is the first tournament ever to see three wrestlers share the Technique Prize. No Fighting Spirit Prize is awarded for the first time since September 2018, after Akiseyama (9-6) and Kotonowaka (10-5) both failed to win. Takakeishō is unsuccessful in his bid for promotion to yokozuna, posting a 2-7 record before withdrawing from the tournament on day 10. He will go into the March tournament as a kadoban ōzeki and will have to achieve a winning record to maintain his rank. Tsurugishō wins his second jūryō championship with a 12-3 record. This is the first time since 2005 that the top two divisions have been won by wrestlers from the same stable.
- 27: The Sumo Association announces the promotions to jūryō for March. Promoted for the first time are Takakento, whose senior classmate in high school was Ichinojō, and Bushōzan, who began to learn sumo at a dojo in Mito City run by the father of former ōzeki Musōyama. Nishikifuji returns to jūryō after falling to makushita for the January 2021 basho, as does Ichiyamamoto, who returns after six tournaments.
- 28: It is announced that the March 2021 tournament has been relocated from Osaka Prefectural Gymnasium to the Ryōgoku Kokugikan in Tokyo, in order to limit the travel of wrestlers and staff amid the ongoing COVID-19 pandemic. It will be the fifth straight basho held in Tokyo after the relocation of last year's July and November tournaments from Nagoya and Fukuoka, respectively. The previous tournament in Osaka was held without spectators in March 2020 at the onset of the pandemic. A Sumo Association official was quoted as saying that holding tournaments in other cities would be "...difficult until the infection is under control."

=== February ===
- 22: Stablemaster Tokitsukaze (former maegashira Tokitsuumi) accepts the Sumo Association's recommendation to retire for violating COVID-19 safety protocols a second time, after it was discovered that he attended a mahjong parlor during the January 2021 tournament. He had previously been demoted two ranks in sumo's hierarchy after he was caught golfing in September 2020. It is decided that coach Magaki (former maegashira Tosayutaka) will take over the Tokitsukaze stable.

=== March ===
- 1: The Sumo Association releases the banzuke for the March 2021 tournament. January makuuchi champion Daieishō is elevated to komusubi, returning to the san'yaku ranks after two tournaments. The March 2021 basho will be the first since November 2019 to have more than two wrestlers at the komusubi rank. Yokozuna Hakuhō will start in his 100th career makuuchi tournament. Hidenoumi, Daiamami and Tsurugishō return to the maegashira ranks. Hidenoumi joins his brother Tobizaru in the top division, the ninth time that two brothers have been ranked in makuuchi at the same time.
- 5: The Sumo Association announces it will test members for COVID-19 between 7 and 10 March, in a similar fashion to what was done before the start of the January tournament. It is also announced that the March maezumō for 35 new wrestlers will be cancelled due to COVID-related concerns, and that the refereeing department will determine the rankings for new jonokuchi wrestlers before the May basho.
- 11: Yokozuna Kakuryū withdraws from the March 2021 tournament, citing a left leg injury. It will be the fourth straight tournament that he has completely pulled out of after his withdrawal following Day 2 of the July 2020 basho. Kakuryū said that he does not plan to retire, despite receiving a warning in November from the Yokozuna Deliberation Committee about his performance. His stablemaster Michinoku told reporters he expects sterner words from the committee after the tournament. Hakuhō, who also received a warning in November, announced that he is ready to compete in the March basho. The Sumo Association announces it has concluded its pre-tournament PCR testing, with one coach from Yamahibiki stable and one coach from Onoe stable testing positive for COVID-19.
- 12: The Sumo Association announces that Azumazeki stable, the first stable to be founded by a foreign-born wrestler, will close on 1 April. Former komusubi Takamisakari had been running the stable on an interim basis following the death of the previous head coach (ex-Ushiomaru) in December 2019 but did not want the job permanently, and will move with the rest of the personnel to Hakkaku stable.
- 13: A total of 28 lower-ranking wrestlers from the Onoe and Yamahibiki stables are to miss the upcoming tournament due to coaches Otowayama and Onogawa testing positive for COVID-19. No sekitori are affected.
- 16: After winning his first two bouts of the March tournament, yokozuna Hakuhō withdraws after doctors inform him that he will need surgery on his right kneecap, according to his stablemaster Miyagino. The surgery will require approximately two months of rehabilitation, meaning that Hakuhō will miss the May 2021 basho. Miyagino said that Hakuhō will decide whether or not to continue competing based on his results in the July tournament.
- 24: The Sumo Association announces the retirement of yokozuna Kakuryū. After earlier indicating that he intended to keep on fighting, Kakuryū had been facing the possibility of further condemnation by the Yokozuna Deliberation Committee after he was issued a warning about his performances in November 2020. He retires with six Emperor's Cups and a makuuchi record of 645 wins and 394 losses. He will retain his wrestler name upon becoming a sumo elder.
- 26: Sandanme wrestler Hibikiryu is taken to the hospital after striking his head on the floor of the dohyō during his Day 13 bout. He died one month after the incident occurred.
- 28: Mongolian sekiwake Terunofuji secures his third career yūshō, defeating Takakeishō on the final day of the March tournament to finish with a 12-3 record. Having posted winning records in every basho since dropping down to the second-lowest jonidan rank in March 2019 - along with two top-division championships - Terunofuji is now expected to be promoted to the ōzeki rank for the second time in his career. The runner-up in the top division is Bulgarian Aoiyama, who defeated earlier tournament leader Takayasu on the final day to finish at 11-4. Four wrestlers are awarded with special prizes: Terunofuji is awarded the Shukun-shō (Outstanding Performance Prize), Aoiyama and Meisei are awarded the Kantō-shō (Fighting Spirit Prize), and Wakatakakage is awarded the Ginō-shō (Technique Prize). Hakuyōzan secures his first championship in jūryō with a record of 11-4. As well as Kakuryū, others to retire after this tournament include former jūryō Kaōnishiki and the only Hungarian in sumo, Masutōō.
- 29: The Yokozuna Deliberation Council repeats the warning it gave Hakuhō last November over his continued absence from competition due to injuries, and will revisit the matter after the July 2021 tournament, which Hakuhō has indicated will be make-or-break for him. The warning also applies to Kakuryū, who had already retired.
- 31: Terunofuji's second promotion to the ōzeki rank is unanimously approved by the Sumo Association. He accepted "with great humility" when informed by JSA representatives at Isegahama stable. He later reiterated his gratitude to his stablemaster, adding that he would devote himself to training and aim higher.
  Two promotions to jūryō are announced, both returning wrestlers: Ōhō, who made his jūryo debut in January with a 5–10 record, and Daishōhō, who returns after three tournaments in makushita.

=== April ===
- 1: The Sumo Association announces its plans for the July 2021 tournament, to be held at the Aichi Prefectural Gymnasium in Nagoya. Seating in the arena will be limited to 50% capacity, or about 3,800 spectators per day. It will be the first sumo tournament held outside of Tokyo since March 2020, when the Haru basho was held in Osaka behind closed doors. The Ryōgoku Kokugikan has hosted all sumo tournaments since then due to the COVID-19 pandemic, but it will not be available in July 2021 as it will be used for boxing matches at the 2020 Summer Olympics. The wrestlers will travel to Nagoya separately stable by stable, instead of en masse by train as in previous years, and will all be vaccinated against COVID-19 at the Kokugikan before leaving.
- 13: The autumn and winter regional sumo tours for 2021 are cancelled by the Sumo Association due to the coronavirus. The last time a regional tour was held - which allow people across Japan to experience live sumo without traveling to an official tournament - was after the November 2019 basho.
- 14: Former sekiwake Kotoyūki announces his retirement. The 30-year-old from Shōdoshima, Shikoku will take the name of Kimigahama Oyakata and become a coach at Sadogatake stable.
- 19: A committee within the Sumo Association submits a proposal that yokozuna Hakuhō not receive honorary elder stock (一代年寄, ichidai-toshiyori; "one-generation elder") and that the Association should formally end the practice of awarding such stocks; four such non-transferable awards were previously given to yokozuna with 20 or more makuuchi championships to allow them to remain part of the Association after retirement under their shikona they held as wrestlers and apply it to a future stable name if they become a stablemaster, rather than adopting and using an existing transferable elder name. Hakuhō has reportedly already begun attempts to acquire a normal elder share under the name of Magaki in March 2021.
- 23: The Sumo Association announces it will hold a meeting on 26 April to discuss how to conduct the May 2021 Tournament in light of a new state of emergency announced for Tokyo from 25 April until 11 May due to rising COVID-19 infections. Japanese media outlets later quoted a source from the association who said that the first three days of the basho (9-11 May) will be closed to the public, in line with the emergency declaration.
- 26: The banzuke is released for the May 2021 tournament. For the first time since the Natsu basho in 1966, there are no rikishi newly promoted to a rank in either the makuuchi or jūryō divisions. It will also be the first basho since September 2012 to have a single yokozuna (Hakuhō) on the banzuke, after the retirement of Kakuryū. Terunofuji is listed as west ōzeki 2, returning to sumo's second-highest rank for the first time since September 2017. Discounting those who were returned to the ōzeki rank with a 10–5 score or better at sekiwake in the tournament immediately following their demotion, he is the first since Kaiketsu in 1977 to win promotion a second time. Takayasu is elevated to sekiwake, while Ishiura, Chiyomaru and Akua all return to the makuuchi division from jūryō. Confirming earlier reports, the Sumo Association also announces that the first three days of the May basho will be closed to spectators due to the COVID-19 emergency declaration in Tokyo.
- 30: The Sumo Association announces it will hold first-aid training for ringside judges, security guards and other personnel, to help with future medical emergencies. The announcement comes shortly after the death of Hibikiryu, who was injured during the March tournament, although Shibatayama Oyakata later clarifies that it was set up in response to the earlier concussion of Shonannoumi in January.

=== May ===
- 7: The Sumo Association confirms that spectators will be permitted at the May 2021 Tournament starting from the fourth day (12 May). While the COVID-19 emergency declaration in Tokyo was extended to the end of the month, restrictions on public attendance at sports events have been partially eased. The Kokugikan will return to similar capacity limits that have been in place since last November.
- 19: Ōzeki Asanoyama withdraws from the May tournament after it emerged that he had broken COVID-19 protocols by dining out with others prior to the tournament. The Sumo Association's director of communications, Shibatayama, said Asanoyama had initially denied the story, which was first reported by the Shūkan Bunshun magazine, but later admitted to violating the COVID protocols. The Sumo Association will continue the investigation before deciding how it will handle the matter.
- 21: Asanoyama submits his resignation to the Sumo Association, which is held pending the outcome of the compliance committee's investigation into the violation of COVID protocols.
  Former komusubi Abi, who had been suspended for three tournaments in August 2020 — also for violating COVID protocols — clinches his second straight championship in the makushita division, ensuring his return to sekitori for the July 2021 basho.
- 23: Ōzeki Terunofuji wins his second consecutive Emperor's Cup, and fourth overall. Fellow ōzeki Takakeishō defeated Terunofuji in their scheduled Day 15 match, resulting in a 12–3 record for both wrestlers. The two faced off again in a playoff, which Terunofuji won by hatakikomi (slap down). After becoming the first person since the kadoban system was introduced in July 1969 to win the Emperor's Cup immediately after returning to the ōzeki rank, Terunofuji will look to become the sport's 73rd yokozuna with a strong performance in the July basho. Endō, who was awarded a win over Terunofuji on Day 14 when the gyōji's decision was reversed and had been in yūshō contention before being defeated by Shōdai, is awarded his fourth Ginō-shō (Technique Prize). Fellow maegashira Wakatakakage is also awarded the Technique Prize for the second straight tournament. Ura takes the jūryō championship with a 12–3 record. Former maegashira Masunoyama and former jūryo Takaryū retire.
- 26: Four promotions to jūryō are announced by the Sumo Association. The newcomer to the sekitori ranks is 27-year-old Kōtokuzan, a Filipino-Japanese wrestler who has been competing in sumo for over eleven years. He finished the May 2021 tournament with a 5–2 record at the top makushita rank. Back-to-back makushita champion Abi returns to jūryō as expected, along with Yago and Kaishō.
- 27: Former komusubi Ryūden, who had withdrawn from the May 2021 tournament for violating COVID protocols, is suspended for three tournaments by the Sumo Association. The suspension is retroactive to the May basho, meaning that Ryūden will be eligible to return to competition in November. His stablemaster Takadagawa (former sekiwake Akinoshima) is issued a 20% salary cut for six months. A decision regarding ōzeki Asanoyama, who had also violated COVID protocols, is postponed while the Sumo Association's compliance committee continues their investigation. Coach Araiso, the former yokozuna Kisenosato, leaves Tagonoura stable to start his own stable, Araiso, which will officially open in August 2021 but the physical stable's construction will not be complete until Summer 2022; the stable will train at University of Tsukuba in the interim.

=== June ===
- 10: Nishikijima (former ōzeki Asashio IV) submits his resignation when the Sumo Association's compliance committee, during their investigation into Asanoyama for violation of COVID protocols, found that Nishikijima himself violated those protocols by inviting Asanoyama for dinner and drinks with his family and acquaintances at a time when wrestlers were prohibited from making non-essential outings.
- 11: Asanoyama is handed a one-year (six tournament) suspension from sumo and a 50% salary cut for six months for violating COVID protocols and initially denying the allegations during the investigation. As a result, he will lose his ōzeki title and fall out of the sekitori ranks completely — possibly dropping to the fourth-tier sandanme division by the time he is eligible to return in July 2022. Asanoyama's retirement papers, which were submitted on 21 May, are held by the Sumo Association in the event he causes any further trouble. His stablemaster Takasago (former sekiwake Asasekiryū) is issued a 20% salary cut for three months.
  Former maegashira and 16-year sumo veteran Asahishō retires and takes the elder name Kiriyama.
- 21: The Sumo Association releases the banzuke for the July tournament in Nagoya. It will mark the return of yokozuna Hakuhō, who will need a strong performance to uphold the dignity of his rank after missing some or all of the last six tournaments. His compatriot Terunofuji sits at east ōzeki 1 for his attempt to climb up to sumo's highest rank. Wakatakakage and Meisei are newly promoted to the san'yaku ranks at komusubi, while Mitakeumi returns to sekiwake after three tournaments. Hokkaido native Ichiyamamoto is promoted to makuuchi for the first time in his career. Returning to the makuuchi division from jūryō are Ura and Chiyonoō, both of whom were last ranked at maegashira four years ago, and January 2020 makuuchi champion Tokushōryū.
  Former sekiwake Ikioi, who has missed the last two tournaments and fallen to sandanme 21, announces his retirement. He becomes Kasugayama Oyakata.

=== July ===
- 4: The first grand sumo tournament held outside of Tokyo since March 2020 — and the first such tournament with spectators since November 2019 — begins in Nagoya. 31-year-old sekiwake Takayasu begins the basho on the sidelines with lower back pain, likely ending any chance of re-promotion to the ōzeki rank. He returned to competition on Day 3.
- 16: Ōzeki Terunofuji stays perfect after Day 13 of the July tournament along with yokozuna Hakuhō. Terunofuji has satisfied the win requirements for promotion to the yokozuna rank, according to his stablemaster and judging department chairman Isegahama (the 63rd yokozuna Asahifuji). Both Mongolians are the only two left in contention for the Emperor's Cup.
- 18: In his first complete basho since March 2020, Hakuhō clinches his record 45th Emperor's Cup by defeating fellow Mongolian Terunofuji in the tournament's final match. Hakuhō's sixteenth perfect tournament (15–0) marks a successful return to the dohyō after knee surgery four months ago, and comes after warnings from the Yokozuna Deliberation Council about his repeated absences. The 36-year-old Hakuhō expressed relief following the match, saying that he did not expect to win the basho with a perfect record at his age. Despite finishing as the runner-up, Terunofuji (14–1) completes a historic comeback after injuries dropped him from the second-highest ōzeki rank to the second-lowest jonidan division, winning three championships and finishing second three other times since returning to makuuchi last July. After the tournament, the judging department officially requested that Sumo Association chairman Hakkaku (the 61st yokozuna Hokutoumi) convene an extraordinary meeting to discuss the promotion of Terunofuji to become the sport's 73rd yokozuna. Special prizes are awarded to two rank-and-filers for the first time, with Kotonowaka receiving the Kantō-shō (Fighting Spirit prize) and Hōshōryū receiving the Ginō-shō (Technique prize). Another Mongolian, Mitoryū, takes the jūryō championship with a 12–3 record.
- 19: The Yokozuna Deliberation Council recommends Terunofuji's promotion to the rank of yokozuna. The Sumo Association is expected to accept the council's recommendation and formalize the promotion on July 21.
- 21: The Sumo Association finalizes Terunofuji's promotion to the rank of yokozuna. In his acceptance speech, he said he would hold on to his "...unshakeable spirit and aim to foster greater dignity and power as a yokozuna." Later, he told reporters that he wanted to have a more determined mindset in sumo, adding that he wanted to understand what it means to be a yokozuna and be a role model to others.
  The Sumo Association announces promotions to the jūryō ranks. New to sumo's second-highest division are Mongolian Hokuseihō, the winner of the July makushita championship, along with Murata, who will adopt the new shikona of Asashiyū in the next basho. Returning to jūryō after one tournament is Churanoumi.
  Kagamiyama stable closes and its personnel move to Isenoumi stable.
- 27: Asanoyama, who is serving a six-tournament suspension for violating COVID-19 protocols, tests positive for the virus along with his stablemaster and five lower-ranked rikishi in Takasago stable, according to the Sumo Association. It is later announced that an eighth member of Takasago stable tests positive.
- 30: The Sumo Association approves the recommendation of the compliance committee that juryo wrestler Takagenji be dismissed from sumo after he was found to have smoked cannabis on at least eight occasions. His stablemaster Tokiwayama is demoted.

=== August ===
- 4: Terunofuji becomes the fifth foreign yokozuna to acquire Japanese citizenship, allowing him to remain with the sport of sumo as a toshiyori when he retires.
- 11: Former maegashira Sagatsukasa retires, ending a 17 year career in professional sumo.
- 24: After a one-month delay due to the coronavirus pandemic, Terunofuji takes part in his first dohyō-iri as a yokozuna at Meiji Shrine. The ceremony was closed to the public, but the Sumo Association streamed the event on YouTube.
- 30: The Sumo Association releases the banzuke for the September tournament. Terunofuji appears at west yokozuna opposite fellow Mongolian Hakuhō, while Meisei is elevated to sekiwake for the first time in his career. Ichinojō returns to the san'yaku ranks for the first time in two years. Asanoyama is demoted to sekiwake as he continues to serve his six-tournament suspension. Yutakayama is the only wrestler promoted from jūryō to maegashira, returning after two tournaments.

=== September ===
- 1: With less than two weeks until the start of the September basho, the Sumo Association announces that new jūryō wrestler Hokuseihō tests positive for COVID-19, and that all wrestlers in Miyagino stable would be tested for the virus. The next day, the Sumo Association announced that the other wrestlers in Miyagino stable tested negative, but that their participation in the tournament would be determined after further testing and consultations are carried out.
- 6: The Sumo Association announces that Miyagino stable will be withdrawn from the September tournament after a second wrestler in the stable tests positive for COVID-19. It is the second time this year that the stable — which includes yokozuna Hakuhō and sekitori Ishiura and Enhō — has had to withdraw from a basho because of a coronavirus outbreak. The Sumo Association also confirms that the Ryōgoku Kokugikan will again be kept to a maximum of 5,000 daily spectators throughout the September tournament.
- 26: New yokozuna Terunofuji wins his fifth career Emperor's Cup, finishing the Autumn tournament with a record of 13–2. His first yūshō at the sport's highest rank was assured when the only other contender going into the last day, Myōgiryū, was pulled down in his match against sekiwake Meisei. Two special prizes are awarded, with runner-up Myōgiryū (11–4) receiving his sixth Ginō-shō (Technique prize) and Daieishō (10–5) receiving the Shukun-shō (Outstanding Performance prize). Abi continues his comeback from suspension by winning the jūryō division championship with a 13–2 record. It is Abi's third sumo championship of the year, having won the makushita championship twice in March and May.
- 27: News outlets report that yokozuna Hakuhō intends to retire from professional sumo, having decided that his continuing knee problems mean he can no longer get through the rigors of a 15-day tournament. Although an official announcement has yet to be made, Yokozuna Deliberation Council chairman Hironori Yano told Kyodo News that Sumo Association chairman Hakkaku conveyed Hakuhō's intentions at a meeting of the association. Sumo Association spokesperson Shibatayama confirmed that Hakuhō's retirement papers had been submitted, and that a meeting would be held to formally approve his acquisition of the Magaki elder stock. The Sumo Association's Board of Directors is expected to finalize his retirement on 30 September.
- 29: The Sumo Association announces the promotions to the jūryō ranks. New to sumo's second-highest division are two wrestlers, Terasawa and Hiradoumi. Terasawa has won three lower-division championships in jonidan, sandanme and makushita since starting professional sumo in 2018, and will adopt the new shikona of Asanowaka in the next basho. Kōtokuzan, who had slipped to makushita following his jūryō debut in July, will return to jūryō once again.
  Among the retirements officially listed by the Sumo Association is jonokuchi wrestler Shōnanzakura. Having retired in July, he is noted for having a record 104 consecutive losses in professional sumo.
  Mongolian komusubi Ichinojō acquires Japanese citizenship, allowing him to remain with the Sumo Association as a coach following his retirement.
- 30: The Sumo Association formally approves the retirement of Hakuhō and his acquisition of the Magaki elder stock.
  It is announced that the January 2022 tournament in Tokyo will once again be limited to 5,000 daily spectators with the same COVID-19 protocols that have been in place with previous tournaments, and that the Spring 2022 tour has been cancelled.

=== October ===
- 1: At a press conference, Hakuhō told reporters that he was filled with relief following his retirement. He said that he had made the decision to retire after achieving double-digit wins at the July tournament in Nagoya, and waited for the right time because of several factors, including Terunofuji's promotion to yokozuna, the Tokyo Olympic and Paralympic Games, and the COVID-19 outbreak that prevented his stable from competing in the September basho.
- 3: The kanreki dohyō-iri of Isegahama (the 63rd yokozuna Asahifuji) is held at Ryōgoku Kokugikan. Two of Isegahama stable's retired wrestlers, Ajigawa (former sekiwake Aminishiki) and yokozuna Harumafuji, served as his tsuyuharai and tachimochi, respectively. The ceremony had been delayed for over a year due to the COVID-19 pandemic.

=== November ===
- 1: The Sumo Association releases the banzuke for the November tournament in Fukuoka. Terunofuji stands all alone at the yokozuna rank following the retirement of Hakuhō. Mongolian Kiribayama is elevated to san'yaku for the first time in his career, sitting in the west komusubi position opposite fellow Mongolian Ichinojō. Takayasu falls back to maegashira after six tournaments at the san'yaku ranks, while Asanoyama is also demoted to maegashira as he continues to serve his suspension. There are no first-time promotions to the makuuchi ranks, meaning the 2021 season will finish with just two such promotions — the lowest number since the six-tournament format was adopted in 1958. Four wrestlers will return to the maegashira ranks for the November basho: Abi, Akua, Sadanoumi and Shōhōzan.
- 14: The November Grand Sumo Tournament begins in Fukuoka. It is the first sumo tournament held in Kyushu in two years, after the November 2020 basho was moved to Tokyo due to the COVID pandemic. Capacity restrictions limit the Fukuoka Kokusai Center to approximately 3,700 daily spectators. Tochinoshin withdraws at the start of the tournament with a back injury, but his stablemaster indicated he could return later in the tournament. A make-koshi could result in Tochinoshin's demotion out of the makuuchi ranks after seven years.
  Magaki (recently retired yokozuna Hakuhō) is seen working at the Fukuoka Kokusai Center in the Sumo Association's blue security uniform. It is the sumo custom for new oyakata to start out as a tournament security guard.
- 27: Terunofuji's sixth career championship in makuuchi is assured on Day 14 of the November tournament after he defeats Abi, who had been the only other wrestler in contention for the Emperor's Cup at the time.
  Former komusubi Chiyoōtori announces his retirement.
- 28: Terunofuji (15–0) collects the Emperor's Cup after securing his first perfect record in makuuchi. He becomes the first sumo wrestler to win his first two tournaments at the yokozuna rank since Taihō, who accomplished the feat in January 1962. Terunofuji was humble during his public interview, appreciating the support of fans in Kyushu who did not see last year's November basho because of COVID-19 and saying that he was "not such a talented wrestler capable of doing many things." Ōzeki Takakeishō and maegashira 15 Abi tie for the runner-up position at 12–3. For Abi, who was in the running for the yūshō until Day 14, it is his fifth consecutive winning record and his first in makuuchi since returning from a COVID-related suspension in March. Abi receives the Kantō-shō (Fighting Spirit prize) for his efforts, along with Takanoshō (11–4), who defeated Abi on the final day. Ura (10–5) is awarded his first sanshō prize, receiving the Ginō-shō (Technique prize) for displaying a variety of winning sumo techniques. Ichiyamamoto (12–3) secures his first jūryō championship, while Ryūden—who, like Abi, was suspended for violating COVID protocols—returns to the dohyō with a perfect 7–0 record and the makushita division championship.
  The Sumo Association displays the full thanks (満員御礼, manin onrei) banner from the ceiling of the Fukuoka Kokusai Center for the final day of the November basho in appreciation of support for sumo wrestling in 2021 during the COVID-19 pandemic. It is the first time that the banner has been hung since the January 2020 tournament.
  The head coach of Kise stable, former maegashira Higonoumi, confirms that ex-jūryō wrestler Higonojō is retiring.

=== December ===
- 1: The Sumo Association announces four promotions to the second-highest jūryō division for the January 2022 tournament. 30-year-old Chiyoarashi returns to jūryō for the first time in eight and a half years. Newly promoted to sekitori are Kotoyūshō, Kitanowaka and Shiba, who will adopt the new shikona of Shiden.
- 2: It is announced that the March 2022 sumo tournament at the Osaka Prefectural Gymnasium will be open to 75% capacity (approximately 5,000-5,500 daily spectators) with COVID prevention measures in place.
- 3: Guinness World Records recognizes coach Magaki (recently retired yokozuna Hakuhō) with a total of five world records. The records are for his 45 career tournament championships, 16 tournament victories without a loss, 1,187 career wins, 1,093 wins in makuuchi, and 84 tournaments at the sports highest’s rank. He had previously been recognized by Guinness World Records in 2015, when he surpassed Taihō’s 33 tournament championships.
- 4: The 70th All-Japan Sumo Championships take place at the Ryōgoku Kokugikan, with Daiki Nakamura, a third year student at Nippon Sport Science University, winning the title of "Amateur Yokozuna" and the right to make his professional debut at the rank of makushita 15.
- 22: Kise stable's Hidenoumi and newly promoted jūryō wrestler Shiden are withdrawn by their stablemaster Kise Oyakata (the former Higonoumi) from the January 2022 tournament for suspected involvement in illegal gambling, pending an investigation.
- 24: The Sumo Association releases the banzuke for the January 2022 Grand Sumo tournament in Tokyo. Takanoshō returns to sekiwake after three tournaments following his 11-win performance in November. Meisei falls from sekiwake to komusubi where he is joined by Daieishō, who returns to san'yaku after three tournaments at maegashira. The makuuchi division sees two new promotions in Wakamotoharu and Ōhō, both of whom finished with 11 wins in the November basho at jūryō. Wakamotoharu is the older brother and stablemate of top maegashira Wakatakakage. Ōhō is the grandson of the late 48th yokozuna Taihō and the son of former sekiwake Takatōriki. Ichiyamamoto, who fell to jūryō in November and won that division's championship, returns to maegashira along with Tsurugishō, who had also been demoted to jūryō in November.
  With former ōzeki Wakashimazu retiring, the Sumo Association formally approves the handover of Nishonoseki stable to Hanaregoma (former sekiwake Tamanoshima); the stable will be known as Hanaregoma stable from January 2022. Kisenosato (the 72nd yokozuna) will change his toshiyori from Araiso to Nishonoseki, and his stable will be renamed Nishonoseki stable. The Araiso elder name will be taken over by Wakashimazu.
- 25: Oguruma (former ōzeki Kotokaze) announces that he will close his stable following the January 2022 sumo tournament.

== Deaths ==
- 29 January: The 49th Yokozuna Tochinoumi, also former Kasugano Oyakata, aged 82, of aspiration pneumonia.
- 8 February: Former sekiwake Haguroyama, also former Tatsunami Oyakata, aged 86.
- 1 March: Former sekiwake Kirinji, also former Kitajin Oyakata, aged 67, of multiple organ failure.
- 11 March: Former ōzeki Maenoyama, also former Takadagawa Oyakata, aged 76, of multiple organ failure.
- 26 March: Kototsurugi, a former sandanme wrestler who achieved greater fame as a sumo manga artist, aged 60.
- 28 April: Sandanme 79 Hibikiryu, aged 28, of acute respiratory failure following an injury after hitting his head on the dohyō during a match in the March 2021 tournament.
- 21 June: Former sekiwake Tamanofuji, also former Kataonami Oyakata, aged 71, of liver cancer.
- 2 July: Former maegashira Kōbō, formerly Otowayama Oyakata, aged 47, of COVID-19.
- 20 November: Former maegashira Toyonoumi, also former Yamahibiki Oyakata, aged 56.

== See also ==
- Glossary of sumo terms
- List of active sumo wrestlers
- List of years in sumo
