= Akua Shōma =

Japanese sumo wrestler

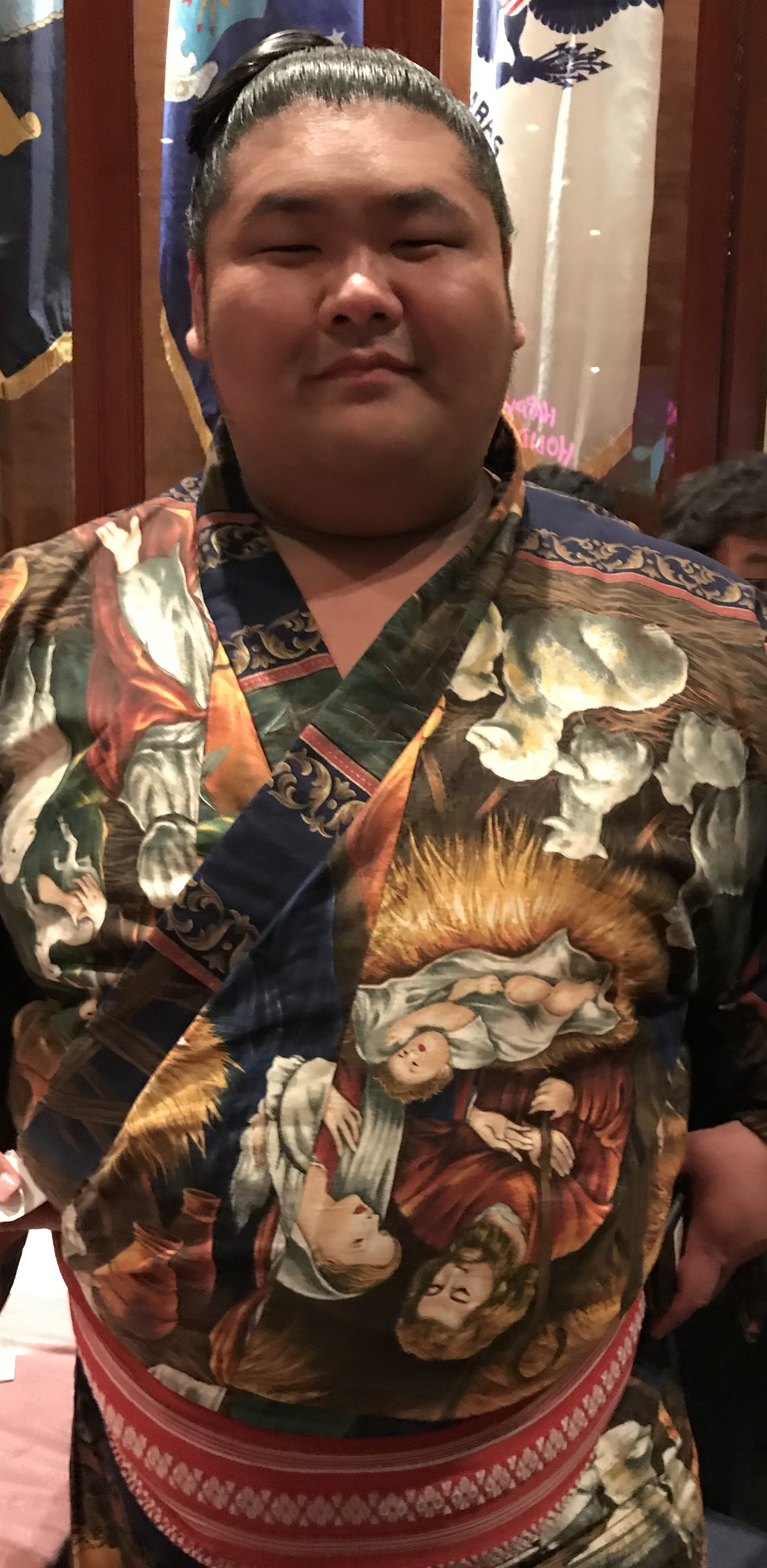
- Akua in December 2018

Personal information
- Native name: 天空海 翔馬
- Born: Yuki Takahata; November 6, 1990 (age 36) Ōarai, Ibaraki
- Height: 1.82 m (5 ft 11 1/2 in)
- Weight: 164 kg (362 lb)

Sport
- Sport: Sumo
- Rank: see below
- Heya: Tatsunami
- Debut: November 2010
- Highest rank: Maegashira 10 (Jan 2022)
- Updated on 26 November 2023

Akua Shōma (天空海 翔馬; born November 6, 1990 as Yuki Takahata (高畠 祐貴, Takahata Yuki)) is a Japanese professional sumo wrestler from Ibaraki Prefecture. He made his debut in November 2010 and reached the top makuuchi division in November 2020, just after turning 30 years of age. He wrestles for Tatsunami stable. His highest rank is maegashira 10. His shikona is a reference to the Aqua World aquarium in his home town.

== Career ==
Akua comes from a family of car dealers, and he took exams at a vocational school to become a certified auto mechanic. Joining Tatsunami stable in November 2010, just a few months later his hometown of Ōarai, Ibaraki was badly hit by the 2011 Tōhoku earthquake and tsunami. He considered quitting sumo and returning home to help out, but was persuaded by his father (who had won a national wrestling competition at junior high school) to continue. Originally known as Toyononami, he changed his shikona to Akua in March 2014, after the Aqua World aquarium in his hometown.

Akua made his makuuchi debut in November 2020, shortly after turning 30 years of age. He secured a winning record in his top division debut by winning his eighth bout on the fourteenth day, defeating Kotoekō.

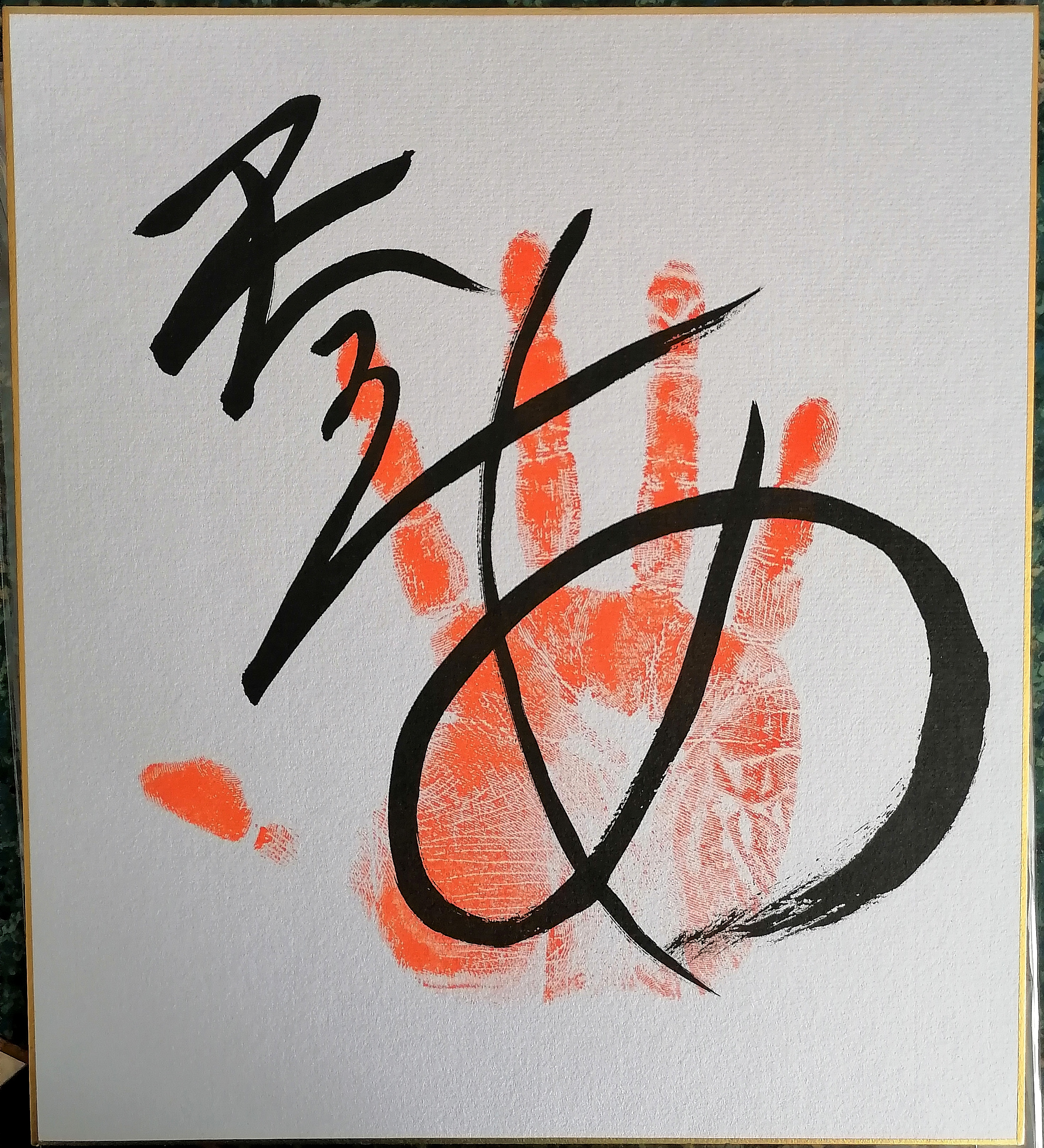
Original tegata (signature and handprint) of Akua

In December 2020, he was one of several members of his stable to test positive for COVID-19. He took part in the following January 2021 tournament but could only score 5–10 and was demoted back to jūryō. He returned to makuuchi in May 2021 but again only scored 5–10 and was demoted. In November 2021 Akua was promoted to the top division for the third time, and on this occasion managed a winning record, securing his eighth victory on Day 13. In January 2022 he was promoted to his highest rank to date of maegashira 10, but scored only four wins against eleven losses. In March he scored 4–11 again and faces demotion to jūryō.

He has twice been involved in car accidents while a passenger travelling to the Ryōgoku Kokugikan, being rear-ended on the fifth day of the November 2020 tournament and suffering whiplash, and being hit by an uninsured car while leaving a toll booth on the expressway during the March 2021 tournament, resulting in a sprain of his cervical spine.

At the May 2025 tournament Akua, then ranked at the top of makushita, began performing the yumitori-shiki (bow-twirling ceremony) following each day's final top division match.

In May 2026, Akua participated a rare seven-way playoff for the third-division championship, losing the final bout to Ikarigata, the younger brother of makuuchi wrestler Fujinokawa.

== Fighting style ==
Akua is an oshi-sumo specialist, who prefers pushing and thrusting techniques. He also has experience in judo, and is fond of kakenage, or "hooking inner thigh throw." In the September 2021 tournament, four of his seven wins through Day 8 were by this technique. He admitted after the tournament that he may have overused the move and that his opponents were beginning to read him.

== Career record ==
Akua Shōma
Year	January Hatsu basho, Tokyo	March Haru basho, Osaka	May Natsu basho, Tokyo	July Nagoya basho, Nagoya	September Aki basho, Tokyo	November Kyūshū basho, Fukuoka
2010	x	x	x	x	x	(Maezumō)
2011	East Jonokuchi #25; 6–1	East Jonidan #52; Tournament Cancelled; Match fixing investigation 0–0–0	East Jonidan #52; 4–3	West Jonidan #18; 5–2	West Sandanme #77; 3–4	East Sandanme #93; 4–3
2012	East Sandanme #76; 6–1	West Sandanme #19; 3–4	East Sandanme #39; 3–4	East Sandanme #55; 4–3	East Sandanme #38; 3–4	East Sandanme #53; 6–1
2013	East Sandanme #3; 3–4	East Sandanme #12; 6–1	East Makushita #34; 2–5	West Makushita #51; 5–2	West Makushita #34; 3–4	West Makushita #41; 4–3
2014	West Makushita #34; 4–3	West Makushita #28; 2–5	East Makushita #48; 6–1	West Makushita #20; 4–3	West Makushita #17; 5–2	East Makushita #12; 4–3
2015	East Makushita #8; 3–4	West Makushita #13; 5–2	East Makushita #8; 4–3	East Makushita #6; 2–5	East Makushita #17; 5–2	East Makushita #8; 4–3
2016	East Makushita #7; 4–3	East Makushita #5; 4–3	East Makushita #2; 1–6	West Makushita #18; 5–2	West Makushita #10; 3–4	West Makushita #16; 5–2
2017	West Makushita #8; 4–3	West Makushita #6; 2–5	West Makushita #15; 4–3	West Makushita #12; 4–3	West Makushita #10; 5–2	West Makushita #4; 5–2
2018	East Jūryō #14; 4–11	West Makushita #5; 4–3	West Makushita #3; 3–4	West Makushita #5; 4–3	West Jūryō #14; 3–9–3	East Makushita #8; 4–3
2019	West Makushita #4; 2–5	East Makushita #11; 3–4	West Makushita #14; 5–2	East Makushita #7; 6–1	East Makushita #2; 6–1	East Jūryō #12; 8–7
2020	West Jūryō #9; 9–6	West Jūryō #6; 4–11	West Jūryō #13; Tournament Cancelled; State of Emergency; 0–0–0	West Jūryō #13; 10–5–PP	West Jūryō #6; 10–5	West Maegashira #16; 9–6
2021	East Maegashira #13; 5–10	West Jūryō #1; 8–7	East Maegashira #17; 5–10	West Jūryō #2; 8–7	West Jūryō #1; 9–6	East Maegashira #16; 9–6
2022	West Maegashira #10; 4–11	East Maegashira #15; 4–11	East Jūryō #4; 5–10	East Jūryō #7; 8–7	East Jūryō #6; 8–7	East Jūryō #5; 10–5
2023	East Jūryō #1; 3–12	East Jūryō #7; 8–7	West Jūryō #5; 5–10	West Jūryō #8; 7–8	West Jūryō #9; 6–9	East Jūryō #10; 5–10
2024	East Jūryō #11; 6–9	East Jūryō #13; 6–9	East Makushita #1; 3–4	East Makushita #5; 4–3	East Makushita #2; 3–4	East Makushita #5; 4–3
2025	West Makushita #2; 3–4	West Makushita #6; 6–1	West Makushita #1; 2–5	West Makushita #9; 3–4	West Makushita #13; 1–6	East Makushita #36; 5–2
2026	East Makushita #22; 2–5	East Makushita #39; 5–2	West Makushita #22; 6–1–PPP	West Makushita #7; 3–4	East Makushita #14; 2–5	West Makushita #25; 3–4
Record given as wins–losses–absences Top division champion Top division runner-up Retired Non-participation Jūryō Lower divisions Sanshō key: F=Fighting spirit; O=Outstanding performance; T=Technique Also shown: ★=Kinboshi; P=Playoff(s); Divisions: Makuuchi — Jūryō — Makushita — Sandanme — Jonidan — Jonokuchi Makuuchi ranks: Yokozuna — Ōzeki — Sekiwake — Komusubi — Maegashira

== See also ==
- Glossary of sumo terms
- List of active sumo wrestlers
