= Shōdai Naoya =

Japanese sumo wrestler

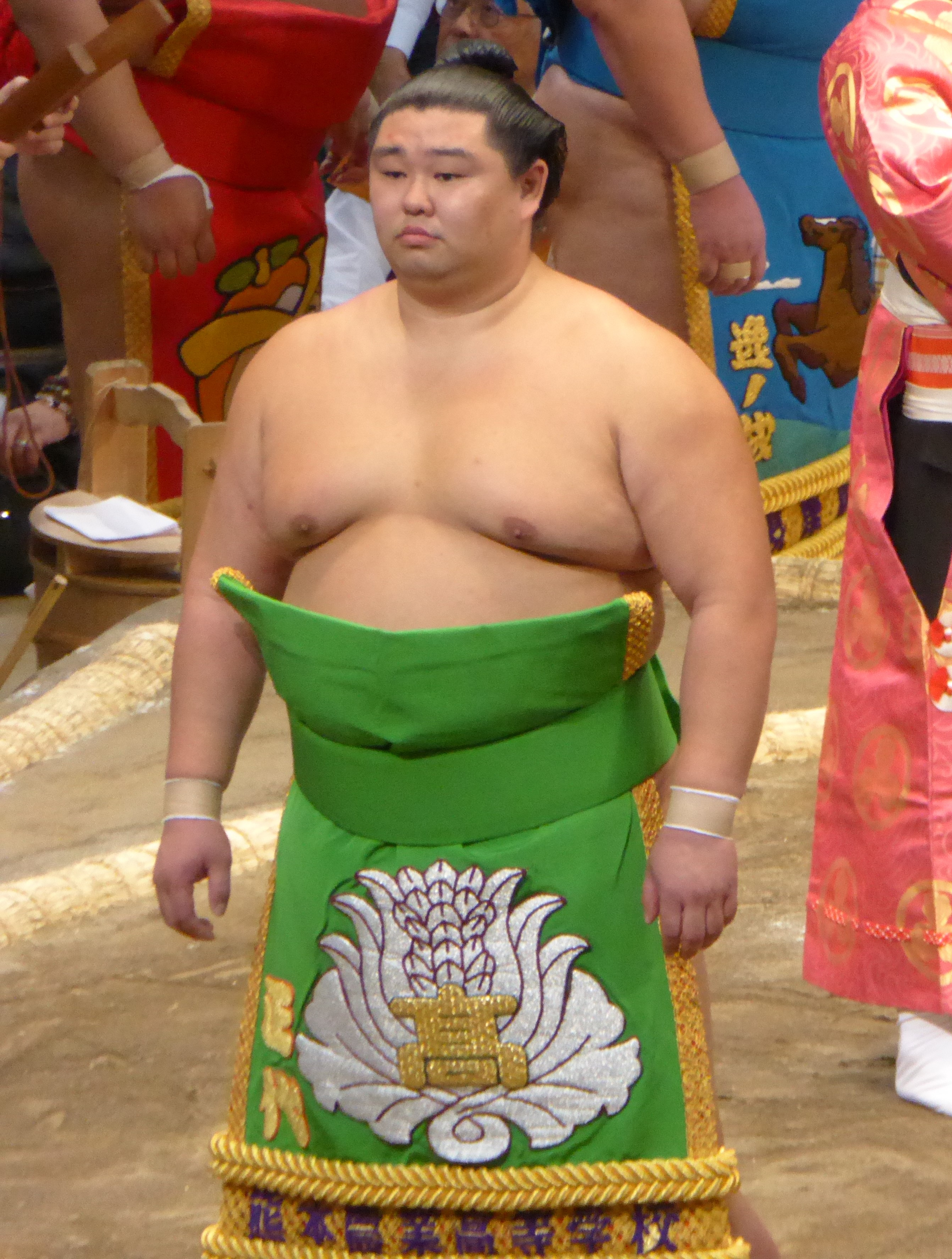
- Shodai in 2017

Personal information
- Native name: 正代 直也
- Born: Naoya Shōdai; November 5, 1991 (age 35) Uto, Kumamoto, Japan
- Height: 1.84 m (6 ft 1/2 in)
- Weight: 168 kg (370 lb; 26.5 st)

Sport
- Sport: Sumo
- Rank: see below
- University team: Tokyo University of Agriculture
- Heya: Tokitsukaze
- Debut: March 2014
- Highest rank: Ōzeki (November 2020)
- Championships: 1 Makuuchi; 1 Jūryo; 1 Makushita; 1 Jonokuchi
- Special Prizes: Fighting Spirit (6), Outstanding Performance (1)
- Gold Stars: 2 Harumafuji; Terunofuji
- Updated on 20 January 2024

Shōdai Naoya (正代 直也; born November 5, 1991) is a Japanese professional sumo wrestler from Uto, Kumamoto. He is in the Tokitsukaze stable. He is a right hand inside-type wrestler. His highest rank is ōzeki. He has two gold stars for defeating a yokozuna and seven special prizes, six for Fighting Spirit and one for Outstanding Performance. He was runner-up in two tournaments before winning his first top-division championship in September 2020.

== Early life and sumo background ==
Shōdai Naoya's talents were first noticed by the coach of the Uto Boys Sumo Club while he was playing sumo in the park at Uto Elementary School. In 5th grade he competed in the national sumo competition, and while at Kakujō Middle School he was an alternate member of the winning team at the All-Middle School sumo championship. In his final year at Kumamoto agricultural high school he won the youth national sumo championship.

Shōdai went on to university at Tokyo University of Agriculture, where he studied international food information sciences in the international agricultural development department. He became a university yokozuna in his second year, and met the qualifications to join professional sumo at the makushita 15 rank as a tsukedashi, however he gave preference to finishing school and missed the one year time limit to accept this opportunity. In his third year at university he advanced to the All-Japan sumo championship, however he lost to Endō and therefore did not attain the amateur yokozuna title that year. He also did not qualify for tsukedashi in his 4th year at university.

== Career ==
After graduating from university, he joined the Tokitsukaze stable and entered his first tournament in March 2014. Because he missed his opportunity to start in the makushita ranks as a tsukedashi, he began in maezumō in this tournament. He lost on the 5th day to Shiba, however finishing with a 2–1 record allowed him to continue to the professional ranks. In May when ranked in jonokuchi (the beginning level of professional sumo), he faced Shiba on day 5 and beat him for the first time. He went on to finish with a 7–0 record and take the jonokuchi championship. This propelled him into the next higher level of sumo, jonidan, in the July tournament, where he finished with a 6–1 record, and advanced to the next higher level, sandanme in the September tournament. He faced Shiba again on day 9 and lost, however his 6–1 record was good enough to advance him to the next higher level, makushita in the November tournament. He lost his third and fourth matches in this tournament to Higoarashi and Asatenmai, however still finished with a promising 5–2 record which allowed him to advance higher up the makushita ranks. In the January 2015 tournament he was concerned that diarrhea and a bacterial infection would affect his performance, however he was able to win the tournament with a perfect 7–0 record when he beat Ishiura, who was promoted to jūryō, on the last day. In the next three tournaments in makushita he attained winning records and was promoted to jūryō in the September 2015 tournament. He kept his family name, Shōdai, rather than change his name as most sumo wrestlers do. His stable master commented that, "It's a good name. Not bad at all".

Later in a press conference, he made comments that were interpreted as pessimistic, and he was dubbed as a "very negative sumo wrestler". However, he finished his first tournament in jūryō with a strong 11–4 record. In the following tournament he improved his previous performance to 13–2, took the jūryō championship, and was promoted to the highest level of sumo, makuuchi.

In the January tournament he became the 20th wrestler from Kumamoto prefecture to attain the highest rank of sumo since the end of World War II. He also became tied for third fastest wrestler to reach the highest level of sumo since 1958 (excluding tsukedashi) at only 11 tournaments. As opposed to another wrestler, Kagayaki, who also was making his top level debut and earned only a 4–11 record, Shōdai earned an impressive 10–5 record, continued his streak of no losing tournaments, and also took the Fighting Spirit prize. He became number two on the all-time list for fastest attainment of a special prize at 12 tournaments since entering sumo, second only to former yokozuna Wakanohana, who took the Fighting Spirit prize in his 9th tournament in January 1950.

In November 2016 he scored eleven wins against four losses from the rank of maegashira 3, sharing the Fighting Spirit prize with Ishiura. He defeated ōzeki Kisenosato in this tournament and was promoted to a career-high rank of sekiwake for the January tournament. It took him only 17 tournaments from his professional debut to reach sekiwake, which is the second fastest (after Konishiki's 14) since the introduction of the six tournaments a year system in 1958 for those starting from maezumō. He narrowly missed out on a winning record in his sekiwake debut, and remained in the junior san'yaku ranks for the following tournament at komusubi. However, he won only four bouts and was demoted back to the maegashira ranks for the May 2017 tournament. In July, ranked at maegashira 1, he earned his first kinboshi or gold star by defeating yokozuna Harumafuji on Day 2. He remained near the top of the maegashira ranks in his next few tournaments. In November 2019 he was a runner-up to Hakuhō with an 11–4 record and earned the Fighting Spirit Prize by defeating Asanoyama on the final day. In January 2020 he was in contention for the championship until the final day, finishing one win behind surprise champion Tokushōryū on 13–2. He also received the Fighting Spirit prize. He returned to the sekiwake rank in March 2020 for the first time since January 2017, and to san'yaku for the first time since March 2017. He was one of only two men to defeat the tournament winner Hakuhō in March and maintained his sekiwake rank with an 8–7 record. In the July 2020 tournament he won his fifth Fighting Spirit prize after a 11-4 performance in which he was one of only two wrestlers to defeat the tournament winner Terunofuji.

In the September 2020 tournament Shōdai won his first championship with a 13–2 record, defeating Tobizaru on the final day to avoid the need for a play-off. His only defeats were to the previous tournament winner Terunofuji on Day 4 and komusubi Okinoumi on Day 7. Shōdai said "I was only in the sole lead on the final day, so until then I wasn't worrying about the championship race and I felt comfortable". He also earned his first Outstanding Performance Prize and sixth Fighting Spirit Prize. He is the first Kumamoto Prefecture native to win a top division championship.

=== Promotion to ōzeki ===
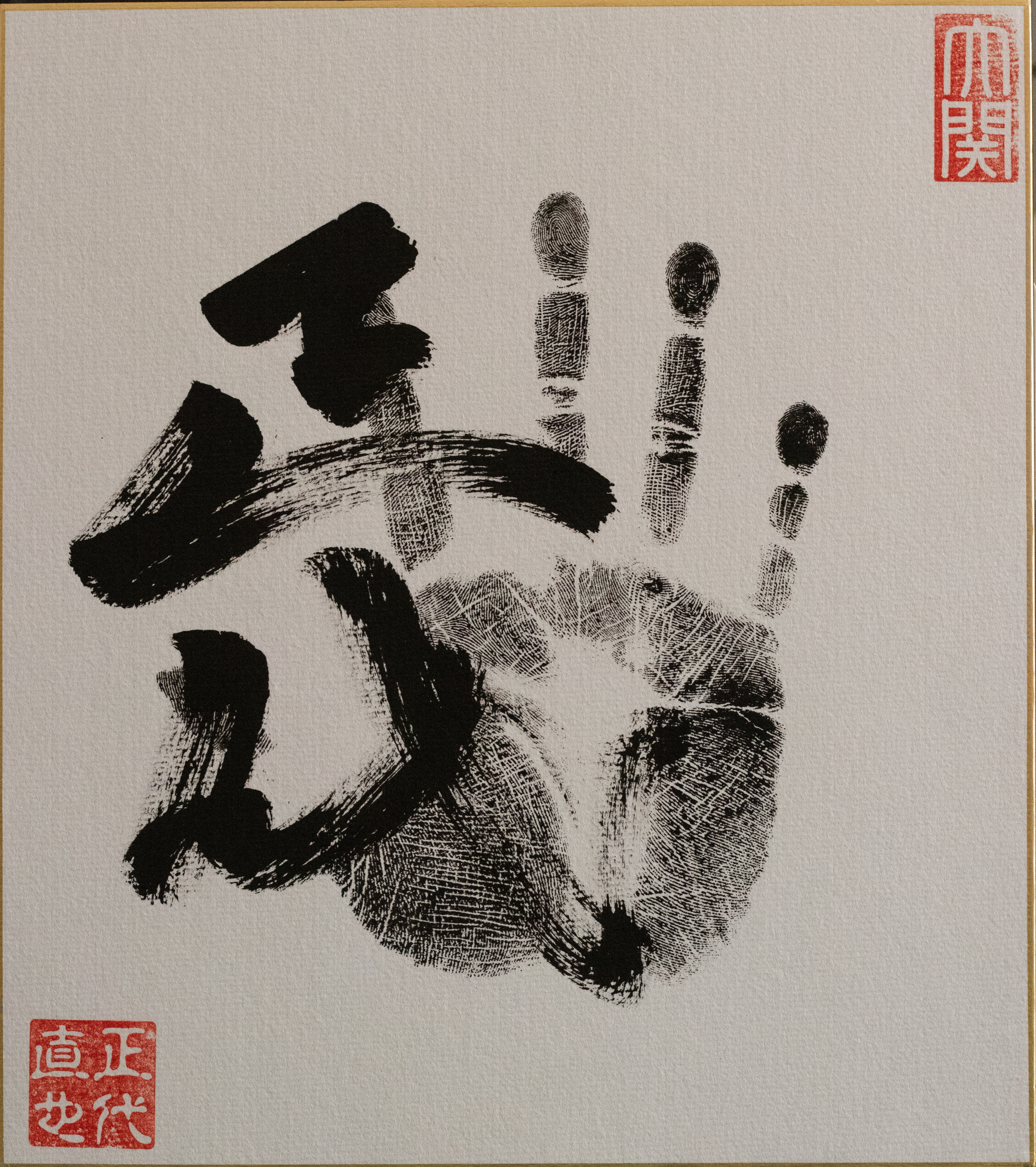
Original Shōdai tegata (handprint and signature)

The Japan Sumo Association announced after the September 2020 tournament or basho that they would convene an extraordinary meeting to discuss Shōdai's promotion to the second-highest rank of ōzeki. Even though he finished with 32 wins over the previous three tournaments - one short of the conventional guideline - it was decided that Shōdai's consistent performances since the November 2019 tournament were enough for him to be considered for ōzeki promotion. The promotion was unanimously approved on 30 September 2020. In his acceptance speech, Shōdai said that he would devote himself to the way of sumo "with the spirit of utmost sincerity so as not to disgrace the name of ōzeki". He later told reporters that he was "relieved" and that he was "in a position where you are expected not to lose". He is the first ōzeki from Kumamoto Prefecture since Tochihikari was promoted in 1962.

Shōdai had a 3–1 start in his ōzeki debut in the November 2020 tournament, but was forced to withdraw on Day 5 with an injury to his left ankle. This was the first withdrawal of his career. He completed his first full tournament as an ōzeki at the subsequent January 2021 basho and achieved a winning record to retain his rank, finishing as joint runners-up with fellow ōzeki Asanoyama and sekiwake Terunofuji. He went back to kadoban status, or in danger of demotion from ōzeki, following his 7-8 finish in the March 2021 tournament. He preserved his ōzeki rank with a 9–6 record in May, his Day 15 win over Endō knocking the maegashira out of contention for the championship.

After finishing the January 2022 tournament with a 6–9 record, Shōdai was once again in danger of demotion from his rank. He contracted COVID-19 in early February and said shortly before the start of the March 2022 tournament that it had delayed his training. Despite these drawbacks, as well as starting the tournament with a 1–5 record, Shōdai won 8 of his remaining 9 bouts, including wins over runner-up Takayasu and champion Wakatakakage to successfully avoid demotion. After a losing 5–10 record in May, Shōdai staged another comeback in July, recovering from losing four of his first five matches to go 9–1 for the rest of the tournament, including a win over Terunofuji on Day 14.

In September 2022 Shōdai went back into kadoban status after falling to a 4–11 record. He suffered his eighth defeat toward the end of the following tournament, resulting in his demotion to sekiwake for the January 2023 tournament. He could have regained his ōzeki rank with a 10-win performance in January, but won only six bouts.

=== Career since demotion ===
Shōdai completed the January 2023 tournament with a make-koshi 6–9 record. As a result, he was demoted in March to maegashira 1. This was the first time he had been listed outside the san'yaku ranks since January 2020.

On the seventh day of the January 2024 tournament, Shōdai at maegashira 4 earned his second kinboshi by defeating yokozuna Terunofuji. Shōdai later said that it had felt like a long time since he was on the offensive throughout a match and that his victory did not seem real to him until he saw the audience throwing cushions. He tied with Jingaku for seventh longest consecutive tournaments between kinboshi.

Shōdai continued to drop in the rankings until he reached the rank of West maegashira 11 at the September 2026 tournament. During that tournament, he performed very poorly, suffering six consecutive losses for a final record of 3–12. As a result of his performance, the likelihood of his demotion to the jūryō division for the November tournament became increasingly certain.

== Fighting style ==
Shōdai is a yotsu-sumo wrestler who prefers grappling techniques to pushing his opponents. His favoured grip on the mawashi or belt is migi-yotsu, a left hand outside, right hand inside position. His most common winning kimarite is a straightforward yori-kiri or force out.

== Personal life ==
In February 2025, Shōdai revealed that he had been married for three years and was the father of a son born in January 2022. By his own admission, he had chosen not to reveal it so that his fans wouldn't associate his underperformance in the ring with his recent marriage. Having organized his wedding reception after the 2025 NHK charity tournament in February, he also disclosed that his wife would be wearing the equivalent of 3 billion yen in jewelry.

== Career record ==
Shōdai Naoya
Year	January Hatsu basho, Tokyo	March Haru basho, Osaka	May Natsu basho, Tokyo	July Nagoya basho, Nagoya	September Aki basho, Tokyo	November Kyūshū basho, Fukuoka
2014	x	(Maezumō)	West Jonokuchi #12; 7–0; Champion	East Jonidan #10; 6–1	East Sandanme #48; 6–1	East Makushita #59; 5–2
2015	West Makushita #37; 7–0; Champion	West Makushita #3; 4–3	West Makushita #2; 4–3	East Makushita #1; 5–2	West Jūryō #12; 11–4	West Jūryō #5; 13–2; Champion
2016	West Maegashira #12; 10–5; F	West Maegashira #6; 9–6	East Maegashira #2; 6–9	East Maegashira #5; 9–6	West Maegashira #2; 7–8	West Maegashira #3; 11–4; F
2017	West Sekiwake #1; 7–8	West Komusubi #1; 4–11	West Maegashira #5; 10–5	East Maegashira #1; 5–10 ★	East Maegashira #5; 6–9	West Maegashira #7; 9–6
2018	East Maegashira #4; 7–8	West Maegashira #4; 7–8	West Maegashira #4; 9–6	East Maegashira #1; 6–9	East Maegashira #3; 6–9	East Maegashira #4; 8–7
2019	East Maegashira #3; 7–8	West Maegashira #3; 5–10	East Maegashira #7; 10–5	East Maegashira #3; 7–8	West Maegashira #4; 3–12	West Maegashira #10; 11–4; F
2020	West Maegashira #4; 13–2; F	West Sekiwake #1; 8–7	East Sekiwake #1; Tournament Cancelled; State of Emergency; 0–0–0	East Sekiwake #1; 11–4; F	East Sekiwake #1; 13–2; FO	East Ōzeki #2; 3–2–10
2021	West Ōzeki #1; 11–4	East Ōzeki #1; 7–8	East Ōzeki #2; 9–6	East Ōzeki #2; 8–7	East Ōzeki #1; 8–7	East Ōzeki #1; 9–6
2022	West Ōzeki #1; 6–9	East Ōzeki #1; 9–6	West Ōzeki #1; 5–10	West Ōzeki #2; 10–5	West Ōzeki #1; 4–11	West Ōzeki #1; 6–9
2023	West Sekiwake #2; 6–9	West Maegashira #1; 10–5	East Komusubi #2; 6–9	East Maegashira #2; 6–9	East Maegashira #3; 8–7	East Maegashira #2; 6–9
2024	West Maegashira #4; 4–11 ★	East Maegashira #10; 8–7	West Maegashira #9; 7–8	East Maegashira #10; 10–5	East Maegashira #4; 10–5	West Komusubi #1; 4–11
2025	East Maegashira #4; 6–9	East Maegashira #7; 6–9	West Maegashira #10; 6–9	West Maegashira #13; 9–6	East Maegashira #11; 10–5	West Maegashira #5; 4–11
2026	East Maegashira #8; 7–8	West Maegashira #8; 8–7	West Maegashira #5; 6–9	East Maegashira #6; 5–10	West Maegashira #11; 3–12	West Jūryō #3; 5–10
Record given as wins–losses–absences Top division champion Top division runner-up Retired Non-participation Jūryō Lower divisions Sanshō key: F=Fighting spirit; O=Outstanding performance; T=Technique Also shown: ★=Kinboshi; P=Playoff(s); Divisions: Makuuchi — Jūryō — Makushita — Sandanme — Jonidan — Jonokuchi Makuuchi ranks: Yokozuna — Ōzeki — Sekiwake — Komusubi — Maegashira

== See also ==
- Glossary of sumo terms
- List of active sumo wrestlers
- List of active gold star earners
- List of active special prize winners
- List of sumo record holders
- List of sumo top division champions
- List of sumo top division runners-up
- List of sumo second division champions
- List of ōzeki
