= Endō Shōta =

Japanese sumo wrestler

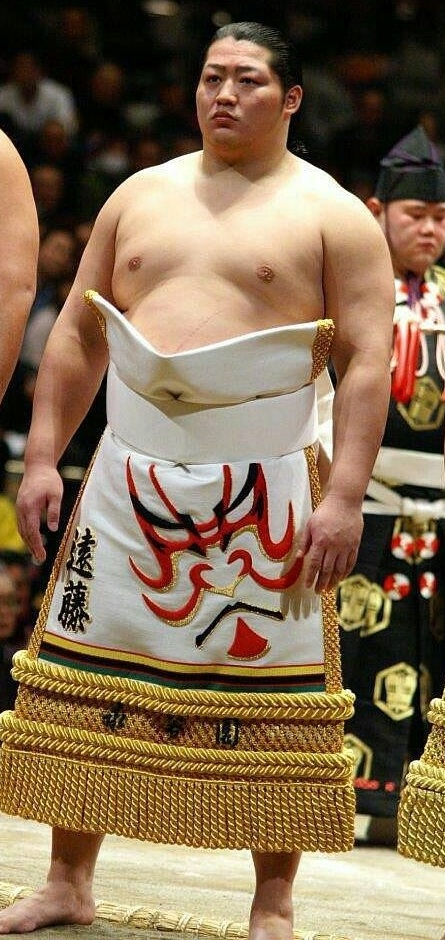
- Endō in 2014

Personal information
- Native name: 遠藤 聖大
- Born: Shōta Endō; October 19, 1990 (age 35) Anamizu, Ishikawa, Japan
- Height: 1.84 m (6 ft 1/2 in)
- Weight: 144 kg (317 lb; 22.7 st)

Sport
- Sport: Sumo
- University team: Nihon University
- Retired: November 2025
- Heya: Oitekaze
- Record: 527-494-88
- Debut: March 2013
- Highest rank: Komusubi (May 2018)
- Elder name: Kitajin
- Championships: 1 (Jūryō)
- Special Prizes: Fighting Spirit (1); Technique (4); Outstanding Performance (1)
- Gold Stars: (7); Kakuryū (4); Hakuhō (2); Kisenosato (1)
- Updated on November 1, 2025

Endō Shōta (Japanese: 遠藤 聖大; born October 19, 1990) is a Japanese former professional sumo wrestler from Anamizu, Ishikawa. After a successful amateur career, he turned professional in March 2013, making the top makuuchi division that September. His highest rank has been komusubi. He has been awarded one special prize for Fighting Spirit, one for Outstanding Performance and four for Technique, as well as seven gold stars for defeating yokozuna. He was runner-up in the September 2016 and September 2021 tournaments. He wrestled for the Oitekaze stable. He is extremely popular with sumo fans and was regarded as one of the most promising home-grown wrestlers in sumo.

Endō retired in November 2025, and is now a coach at Oitekaze stable under the elder name Kitajin.

== Early life and sumo background ==
Endō first began trying out sumo in his primary school years largely to please his father. He did not like sumo at first, but as time went on he became inspired by the spirit and technique of then yokozuna Asashōryū. He began trying out more techniques and came to love sumo. In his second year of junior high school, he participated in a Kanazawa area sumo competition, where he won the team championship as well as beating the future Tochinosato in a playoff to take the individual championship. In high school, he participated in several team and individual competitions, taking two separate championships. Upon graduation he entered Nihon University as an economics major. From his fourth year, he was captain of the sumo team. That year he also took two major national championship titles becoming both the amateur sumo yokozuna as well as the National Athletic Championship yokozuna. Despite his great success at sumo thus far, it was a difficult decision for Endō whether or not to go professional, because he had a dream of becoming a teacher.

== Career ==
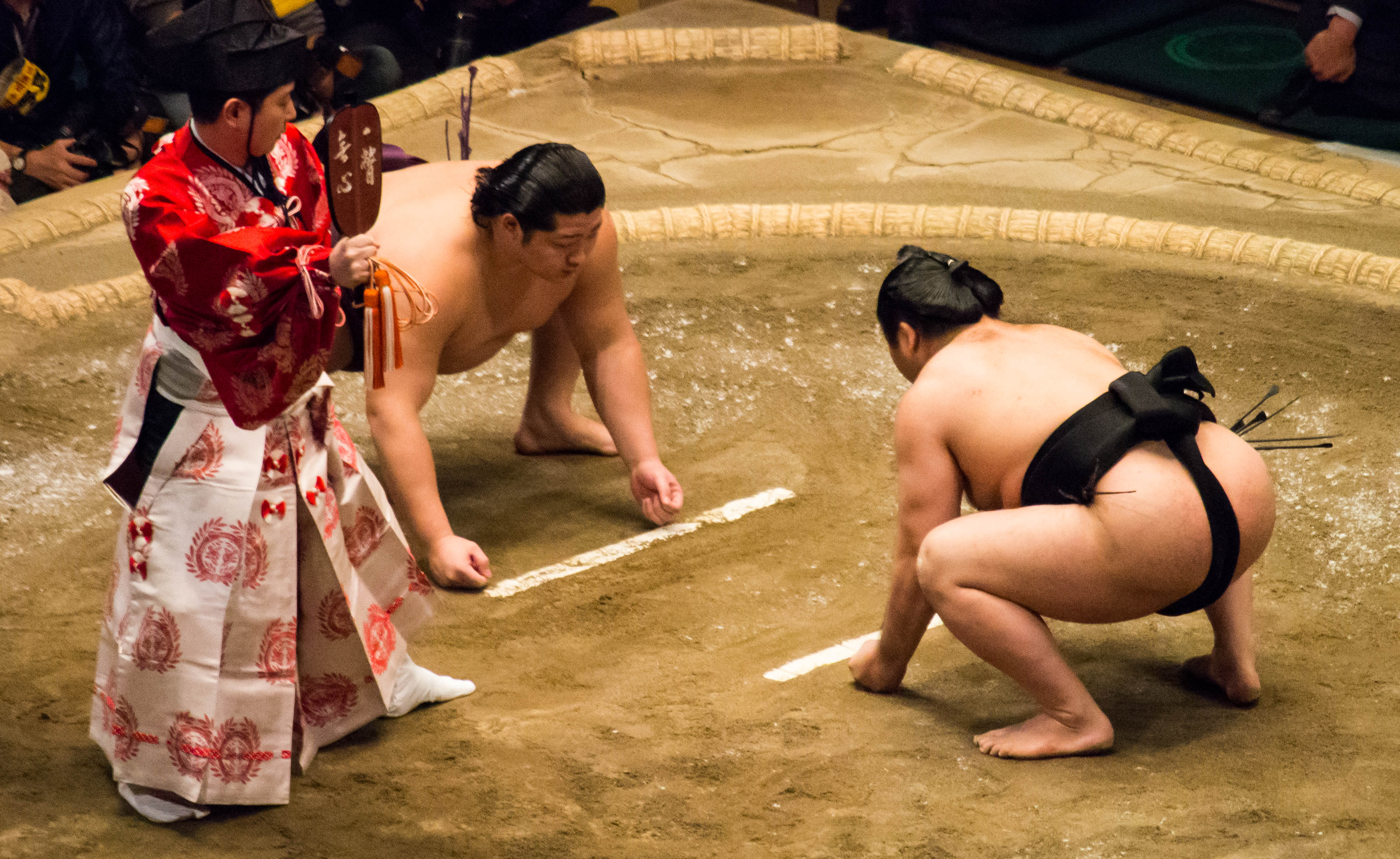
Endō (left) vs. Satoyama January 2014

After taking some time to reflect he decided to join professional sumo as a wrestler for Oitekaze stable, the stable where Daishōyama, who was from the same hometown as him, was the founder and head coach. Upon entering professional sumo, he was allowed to debut as a makushita tsukedashi instead of starting at the bottom of the ranks, to reflect his amateur success. Moreover, because of his two national championships he was allowed to debut at an even higher rank than other amateur champions. This debut at makushita 10, was only the second time this has had been allowed, following his Nihon University predecessor Ichihara. He entered the professional ring in the March 2013 tournament, choosing to keep his surname of Endō as his shikona. He was not quite as successful as was expected, managing two consecutive tournaments with strong, but less than ideal, 5–2 records. They were enough, however, to allow him to join the salaried ranks of jūryō for the July 2013 tournament. He did so without a top-knot as his hair was still not long enough for one. Debuting at the rank of jūryō 13, he came into his own, finally giving the kind of performance that had been expected of him. He beat several wrestlers with top makuuchi division experience as well as other up and comers, including the closely watched Egyptian wrestler Ōsunaarashi. His only loss was to jūryō regular Tokushinhō. His 14–1 record was at least a four win berth over any other wrestler in the division and his championship was already decided by the 13th day of the tournament. His previous amateur success, his technique and his seemingly effortless championship fueled speculation that Endō could be the next big Japanese hope in professional sumo in a sport largely dominated by foreigners in the higher ranks.

His success continued into his makuuchi debut in September 2013, where he scored a majority of wins, although he damaged his left ankle and dropped out of the tournament on Day 14. After making a respectable comeback in November with a score of 6–9 from the rank of maegashira 7, he had his best result in the top division to date in January 2014, winning eleven bouts and the Fighting Spirit Prize. He was even matched with an ōzeki, Kotoshōgiku, on Day 12, although he lost this bout. Promoted to the top of the maegashira ranks for the March 2014 tournament, he faced three ōzeki and two yokozuna in his first five matches. He lost the first four but defeated Kisenosato on Day 5, his first win over an ōzeki, and the fact that he was still without a top-knot was also noted. He finished the tournament with a 6–9. The following May 2014 tournament, while only managing a 7–8, he got his first kinboshi or gold star win against yokozuna Kakuryū.

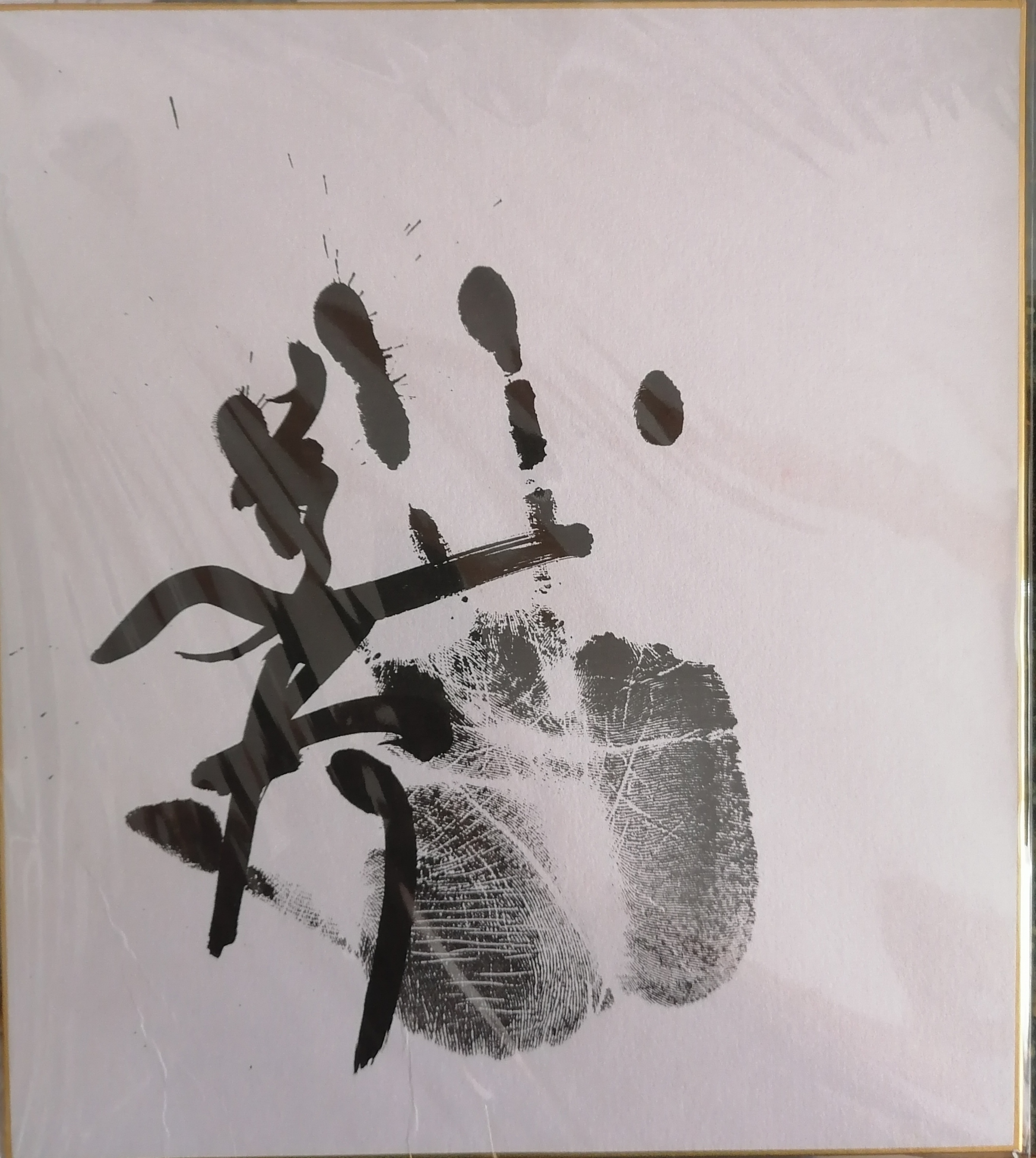
Endo's tegata (handprint and signature)

Endō suffered a serious injury to his left knee after a bout against Shōhōzan on the fifth day of the March 2015 tournament, rupturing anterior cruciate ligaments and damaging the lateral meniscus. He opted not to have surgery and competed in the following tournament in May, knowing he would be demoted to jūryō if he failed to take part. Although he only scored six wins against nine losses, it was enough to keep him in the top division. In the Nagoya tournament in July, he came through with a solid 10–5 record and recorded 8 wins in September. A disappointing 4–11 in November however, was followed by a sprain to his right ankle in the January 2016 tournament (attributed to over-compensating for his previous left knee injury) and Endō was demoted to the second division (jūryō) for March. He returned to the top division in May 2016 and scored 11–4, although a defeat on the final day meant he missed out on a share of the Fighting Spirit prize. In September 2016, fighting from the low rank of maegashira 14, he finished runner-up to Gōeidō on 13–2 and won his first Technique Prize. In November he defeated three ozeki and yokozuna Hakuho but lost four of his last five matches to finish with a make-koshi 7–8 record, which cost him the Outstanding Performance Award. Fighting at the rank of maegashira 1 in May 2017 (his highest rank since September 2014), on Day 4 he was the first to earn a kinboshi against new yokozuna Kisenosato, giving Endo the third of his career. He withdrew from the July tournament on the fifth day due to an injury to his left ankle. He underwent surgery on the ankle in late July.

Endō picked up his fourth kinboshi in the January 2018 tournament with a defeat of Kakuryū, and won his second Technique Prize in March. His consecutive kachi-koshi performances in the tournaments following his injury earned him a sanyaku rank for the first time for the May 2018 tournament, at komusubi.

Prior to his san'yaku debut in May 2018, Endō purchased the Kitajin elder stock from the former Kirinji, indicating he intended to stay in sumo as a coach upon his retirement. At the May tournament, he injured his right arm in his Day 6 match against fellow komusubi Mitakeumi and had to withdraw. Although he returned on Day 10 he was unable to win any of his remaining matches and finished with a 3–10–2 record.

Endō earned his fifth and sixth kinboshi with back-to-back victories over Kakuryū and Hakuho on Day 1 and Day 2 of the January 2020 Hatsu basho. He came the third wrestler post WWII to win back-to-back kinboshi on the opening two days of a tournament, and the first since Tochiazuma in September 1999. He returned to komusubi in March, but after a 7–8 record was demoted to maegashira 1. In July he earned another kinboshi, defeating Kakuryū on opening day. Back at komusubi in September 2020, he withdrew on Day 11 with only three wins, after a build-up of fluid in his right knee related to his previous injury. He withdrew from the March 2021 tournament on Day 10, due to a calf injury that he suffered in training before the tournament and aggravated on Day 9. Ranked at maegashira 8 in May 2021, He stood at 9–3 after twelve days, and was then matched against two ōzeki, defeating Takakeishō on Day 13, and then tournament leader Terunofuji on Day 14, a close bout that went to a judges' conference after the gyōji had originally called Terunofuji the winner. This put him just one win off the lead going into the final day, and had he won his final bout he could have been involved in a three-way playoff for the yūshō with Takakeishō and Terunofuji. However, he lost to Shōdai in his last match, finishing on 11–4 and missing out on the Outstanding Performance Prize. He did receive his fourth career Technique Prize. He was forced to withdraw from the July 2021 basho after reinjuring his left leg, which required about three weeks of recovery. Fighting from the rank of maegashira 11 in September, he produced an 11–4 record and shared runner-up honours with Myōgiryū.

Endo withdrew on Day 7 of the May 2023 tournament after suffering six straight losses. His medical certificate stated that he had sprained both of his knee joints and would require about three weeks of rest.

Endo has been extremely popular among fans, some of whom praise his face and deep voice and tie his success to the overall popularity of sumo. The Japan Sumo Association has capitalized on this popularity by marketing a pillow depicting Endo readying for a charge.

After a series of make-koshi, Endō found himself relegated to a position of potential demotion to the jūryō division. The risk of losing his makuuchi status was further increased when, on Day 10 of the March 2024 tournament, he suffered an eighth defeat at the hands of Kinbōzan. Endō was effectively demoted to the jūryō division for the May tournament but during that tournament he won ten in a row from day one, a first for eight years, putting him alone in the lead for the championship. However, he lost his lead in the title race after suffering defeats from jūryō debutant Ōnokatsu and from the eventual jūryō winner, former sekiwake Wakatakakage. Despite missing out on the championship, his twelve wins were enough to see him return to the top division for the July 2024 tournament.

=== Demotion and retirement ===
After remaining in the middle of the maegashira rankings, it was announced ahead of the July 2025 tournament that Endō underwent knee surgery and would miss about 1-2 months of training. This resulted in Endō's demotion once again to jūryō for the following tournament. Endō formally withdrew at the start of the September 2025 tournament, with his medical certificate stating that he would be undergoing surgery for arthroscopic ACL reconstruction requiring an additional two months of recovery.

Endō was demoted to the rank of makushita on the November 2025 banzuke, dropping out of sekitori status for the first time since his 2013 professional debut. Shortly after the rankings were released, multiple news outlets in Japan reported that Endō had decided to retire from competition, adding that a formal announcement was pending from the Japan Sumo Association. At the same time, it was officially announced that former maegashira Tenkaihō had departed the Sumo Association as a coach, which would allow Endō to take over the Kitajin elder name that he already possessed. The Sumo Association made Endō's retirement official about a week later, on 1 November 2025.

On the first day of the November 2025 tournament in Fukuoka, Endō held his retirement press conference. He told reporters that he had intended to return to competition after undergoing the surgeries earlier in the year, but his thoughts changed while undergoing rehabilitation. He said that during what would end up being his final match in the May 2025 tournament against Asakōryū, he thought that "this might be it" in regard to his career. Endō said that he had truly given it his all and had no regrets, adding that he wanted to train "strong sumo wrestlers."

== Personal life ==
In October 2019, Endo announced that he had been married since May and was no longer living at his stable. He declined to answer any questions about his bride saying "She's an ordinary member of the public, so I think it's not necessary to answer to that".

Considered a local hero in his hometown of Anamizu, Endō gave his name to the municipality's stadium and his sanshō trophies are displayed there.

Since his family still lived in Ishikawa Prefecture, Endō was part of a delegation of wrestlers from the prefecture (along with Ōnosato, Kagayaki and the former Tochinonada) sent on 6 February after the 2024 Noto earthquake; charged with symbolically presenting Governor Hiroshi Hase with the sums raised during the January tournament and donations from the Sumo Association. During the visit, he expressed his concern that his parents were having difficulty accessing water due to cut-offs.

== Fighting style ==
Endō was a yotsu-sumo wrestler, preferring grappling techniques to pushing and thrusting. He used a hidari-yotsu grip on the mawashi, with his right hand outside and left hand inside his opponent's arms. He had a flexible offense, and was good at catching his opponents off-guard. He was also known for his tsuparri technique, which involved thrusting at his opponents rapidly with open palms.

Endō's most common winning kimarite was a straightforward yorikiri, or frontal force out, which was responsible for one-third of his total career victories. Other common winning techniques for Endō were oshidashi (frontal push out) and hatakikomi (slap down).

== Career record ==
Endō Shōta
Year	January Hatsu basho, Tokyo	March Haru basho, Osaka	May Natsu basho, Tokyo	July Nagoya basho, Nagoya	September Aki basho, Tokyo	November Kyūshū basho, Fukuoka
2013	x	Makushita tsukedashi #10; 5–2	East Makushita #3; 5–2	West Jūryō #13; 14–1; Champion	East Maegashira #13; 9–5–1	West Maegashira #7; 6–9
2014	West Maegashira #10; 11–4; F	East Maegashira #1; 6–9	East Maegashira #4; 7–8 ★	West Maegashira #5; 8–7	West Maegashira #1; 3–12	West Maegashira #8; 10–5
2015	East Maegashira #3; 6–9	West Maegashira #5; 4–1–10	West Maegashira #9; 6–9	East Maegashira #12; 10–5	East Maegashira #7; 8–7	West Maegashira #4; 4–11
2016	East Maegashira #11; 1–6–8	East Jūryō #6; 11–4	West Maegashira #15; 11–4	West Maegashira #6; 3–12	East Maegashira #14; 13–2; T	East Maegashira #3; 7–8 ★
2017	West Maegashira #4; 7–8	East Maegashira #5; 8–7	West Maegashira #1; 6–9 ★	West Maegashira #3; 2–3–10	East Maegashira #14; 10–5	East Maegashira #9; 9–6
2018	West Maegashira #5; 9–6 ★	East Maegashira #1; 9–6; T	West Komusubi #1; 3–10–2	East Maegashira #6; 8–7	West Maegashira #3; 3–12	West Maegashira #12; 9–6
2019	West Maegashira #9; 10–5	West Maegashira #1; 7–8	East Maegashira #2; 7–8	West Maegashira #2; 10–5; T	West Komusubi #1; 8–7	West Komusubi #1; 7–8
2020	East Maegashira #1; 9–6; O★★	West Komusubi #1; 7–8	East Maegashira #1; Tournament Cancelled; State of Emergency; 0–0–0	East Maegashira #1; 8–7 ★	West Komusubi #1; 3–9–3	West Maegashira #7; 8–7
2021	East Maegashira #5; 7–8	East Maegashira #5; 5–5–5	West Maegashira #8; 11–4; T	East Maegashira #1; 1–4–10	East Maegashira #11; 11–4	West Maegashira #4; 8–7
2022	West Maegashira #3; 7–8	West Maegashira #4; 8–7	East Maegashira #4; 7–8	East Maegashira #5; 3–10–2	West Maegashira #6; 7–8	East Maegashira #7; 6–9
2023	West Maegashira #9; 9–6	East Maegashira #6; 9–6	West Maegashira #2; 0–7–8	East Maegashira #16; 10–5	West Maegashira #10; 9–6	East Maegashira #8; 5–10
2024	East Maegashira #13; 5–10	East Maegashira #16; 5–10	East Jūryō #3; 12–3	West Maegashira #14; 10–5	East Maegashira #8; 8–7	East Maegashira #7; 7–8
2025	East Maegashira #7; 6–9	West Maegashira #9; 7–8	East Maegashira #11; 9–6	West Maegashira #7; Sat out due to injury 0–0–15	East Jūryō #3; Sat out due to injury 0–0–15	East Makushita #3; Retired –
Record given as wins–losses–absences Top division champion Top division runner-up Retired Lower divisions Non-participation Sanshō key: F=Fighting spirit; O=Outstanding performance; T=Technique Also shown: ★=Kinboshi; P=Playoff(s); Divisions: Makuuchi — Jūryō — Makushita — Sandanme — Jonidan — Jonokuchi Makuuchi ranks: Yokozuna — Ōzeki — Sekiwake — Komusubi — Maegashira

== See also ==
- List of sumo tournament top division runners-up
- List of sumo tournament second division champions
- List of active gold star earners
- Glossary of sumo terms
- List of past sumo wrestlers
- List of komusubi
