= Tokushōryū Makoto =

Japanese sumo wrestler (born 1986)

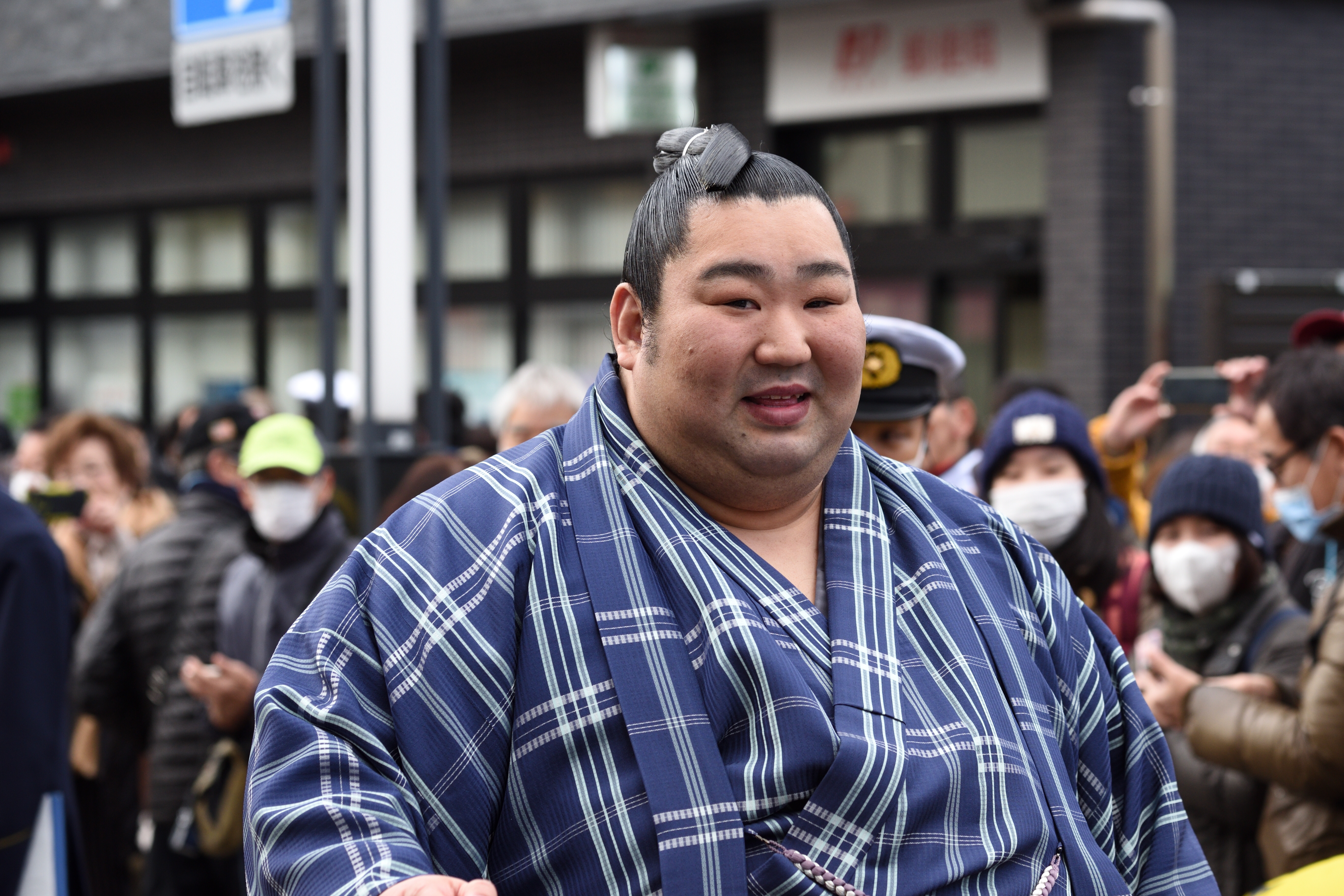
- Tokushōryū in February 2020

Personal information
- Native name: 德勝龍 誠
- Born: Makoto Aoki; August 22, 1986 (age 40) Nara, Nara, Japan
- Height: 1.83 m (6 ft 0 in)
- Weight: 192 kg (423 lb)

Sport
- Sport: Sumo
- University team: Kindai University
- Retired: September 2023
- Heya: Kise → Kitanoumi → Kise
- Record: 553-570-1
- Debut: January 2009
- Highest rank: Maegashira 2 (March 2020)
- Elder name: Sendagawa
- Championships: 1 Makuuchi; 1 Jūryō; 1 Sandanme; 1 Jonokuchi
- Special Prizes: 1 Outstanding Performance; 1 Fighting Spirit
- Gold Stars: 1 (Kakuryū)
- Updated on 11 September 2023

Tokushōryū Makoto (Japanese: 德勝龍 誠; born August 22, 1986 as Makoto Aoki (青木 誠, Aoki Makoto)) is a Japanese former professional sumo wrestler from Nara. An amateur sumo competitor while studying at Kinki University, he joined Kise stable and made his professional debut in January 2009. He won championships in the jonokuchi, sandanme and jūryō divisions, and first reached the top makuuchi division in July 2013. After spending most of 2018 and 2019 in the second tier, Tokushōryū returned to makuuchi in January 2020 and recorded 14 wins to take an upset top-division championship victory at the age of 33. He retired from competition in September 2023 and is now coaching, first at Kise stable and then at Nishikido stable, as an elder. His highest rank was maegashira 2, and he earned one kinboshi and two special prizes in his career.

== Early life and sumo background ==
Makoto Aoki first tried out sumo at a dojo outside his school when he was a fourth grader in elementary school. He continued into junior high school at another dojo then transferred to Meitoku Gijuku High School, which was well known for its sumo program. In his second year there, he took an inter-high school championship, and in his third year he was in the top eight group of high school wrestlers. He entered a management program at Kindai University and also continued amateur sumo. He was not able to attain university yokozuna status, but did manage to win some regional championships.

As he was involved in sumo much of his school life, many current and former wrestlers were his teammates during his amateur sumo years at school. At his high school, Tochiōzan was from his year, and Chiyozakura and Dewaōtori were his upper classmen. In university Homarefuji was an upperclassman, and Takarafuji, in his year, was in the same management course as he was.

== Career ==
=== Early career ===
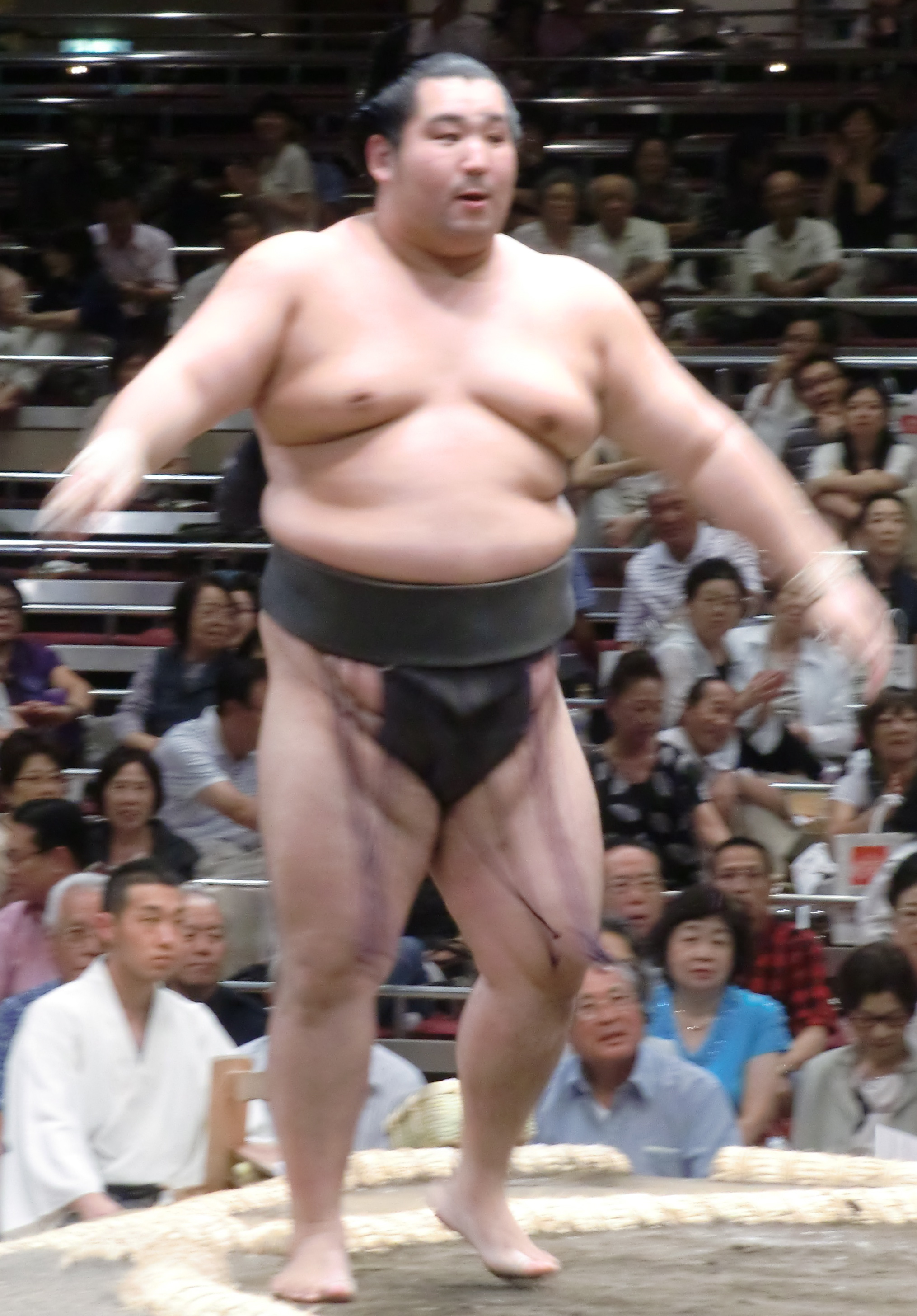
Tokushōryū at the September 2011 tournament

In his fourth year in university he made the decision to join Kise stable and first stepped into the ring for the January 2009 tournament, along with other contemporaries such as Takarafuji, Kimikaze and Takanoiwa. Despite his successes in amateur sumo, he never achieved student yokozuna status so was not allowed to enter professional sumo at an elevated rank (see makushita tsukedashi) and had to start at the bottom of the ranks.

His skill and experience gave him a string of winning tournaments from his entry into sumo, and he also took the bottom division jonokuchi championship in his debut tournament, with a 6-1 score without a playoff (which is very rare in sumo), followed by a perfect 7–0 sandanme championship in September of that same year. He was promoted to the makushita division in the November tournament following his championship. He spent all of 2010 in makushita and had only two losing tournaments until reaching makushita 2 in November of that year. Though on the cusp of being promoted to the salaried ranks of jūryō, he only managed a 1–6 record. He changed his ring name from his surname to Tokushōryū in January 2011. He spent most of 2011 working his way through makushita much as he had in 2010. On reaching makushita 1 in the September tournament he put in an impressive 5–2 record and achieve promotion to jūryō on his second chance.

In his first jūryō tournament in November 2011 he garnered a lot of attention by winning his first seven bouts, however he lost four in a row after that, ending with a 10–5. This was followed by a disastrous 2–13 record for the January 2012 tournament, largely due to a knee injury, which dropped him back to makushita. He fought back with a 4–3 record in the following March tournament and earned re-promotion to jūryō. From this point on he managed to work his way through jūryō posting mostly winning records. This continued up until the May 2013 tournament, where he achieved a strong 12–3 record and almost took the jūryō championship, only losing it to Kotoyūki on the last day of the tournament. This was still enough to earn him promotion to the top-tier makuuchi division for the July 2013 tournament.

=== Makuuchi and later career ===
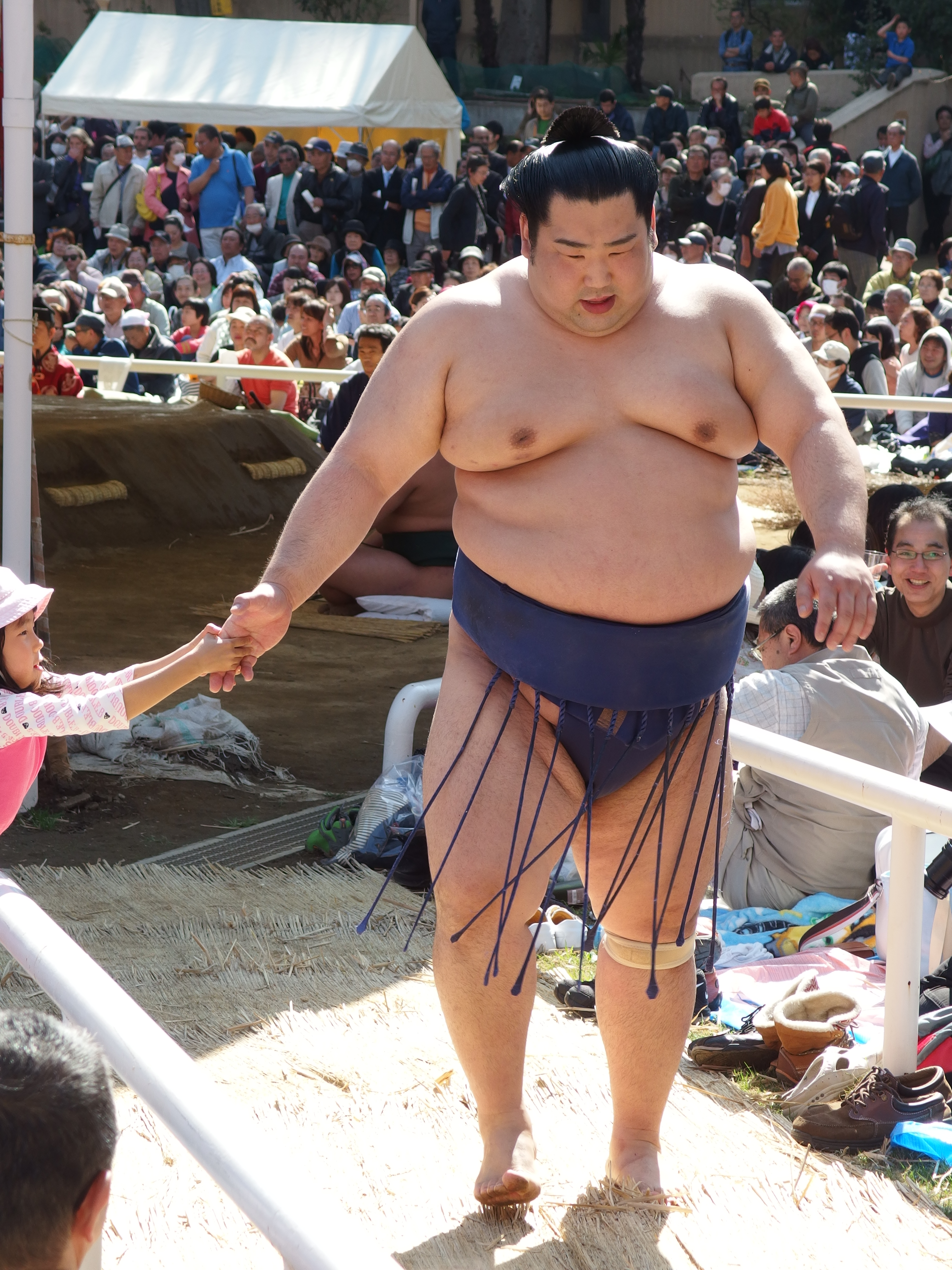
Tokushōryū at Yasukuni Shrine, April 2014

In his first top-tier tournament Tokushōryū managed a 9–6 record, making him the first makuuchi debut wrestler in 2013 to achieve a winning record. In the following two tournaments however, he would get two consecutive losing records, just barely managing to avoid demotion. He dropped to the second division in 2014 but was immediately promoted back to makuuchi after posting a 12–3 record. Fighting from the low rank of maegashira 16 in the January 2015 tournament he scored 11–4 and was runner-up to Hakuhō, who won a record-breaking 33rd yūshō. He remained in the top division for the next two years, reaching maegashira 4 in May 2015. He then dropped down the banzuke and was relegated again after the September 2016 tournament. Tokushōryū returned to makuuchi in March 2017, but a record of only 4–11 in consecutive tournaments in July and September saw him demoted to jūryō once again. In September 2018 he won his first jūryō division championship after a playoff win over Daiamami. He returned to the top division in May 2019 but only for one tournament as he recorded four wins against eleven losses, a failure he later attributed to a "lack of appetite for victory" because he was content simply to be in makuuchi again.

After recording eight wins in November 2019 he earned his sixth promotion to the top division and started the January 2020 tournament at west maegashira 17, making him the lowest-ranked of the 42 entrants. He defeated Chiyoshōma in his first bout before losing to Kaisei on the second day but then recorded eleven straight wins to enter the penultimate day in a tie for the lead with Shōdai. He was then matched against Shōdai and won by tsukiotoshi to take the sole lead. The final match on the last day of the tournament saw Tokushōryū pitted against ōzeki Takakeishō and needing to win to take the title: if he lost he would have to face Shōdai again in a play-off. Tokushōryū secured a right hand outside grip on Takakeishō's belt and forced his opponent out of the ring to win by yorikiri. He became the first wrestler from Nara Prefecture to win a top division championship in 98 years and the first to do so from the bottom rank in the division since Takatōriki in March 2000. In addition to the yūshō, Tokushōryū also received his first ever sanshō or special prizes, for Outstanding Performance and Fighting Spirit.

When asked if his good results in the early part of the tournament had led him to focus on the championship, Tokushōryū said: "I didn't think about it... OK, That's a lie. I was actually absorbed by the idea... Since the start, I'd been thinking if I give it all I have, that will be plenty. If I do my best on the opening charge, I can live with the results that follow. I'd done it my way all along, and the final day was the same. Rather than say I'm already 33, I prefer to think of myself as being only 33." Referring to his visible display of emotion upon clinching victory, rarely seen on the dohyō, he said, "I might have cried too much, but at that moment I felt relieved from all the pressure." Araiso-oyakata (former yokozuna Kisenosato) commented, "People are always telling him to lose weight. But the weight that had been a shortcoming is now an asset." Tokushōryū also paid tribute to his mentor at Kindai University's sumo club, Katsuhito Ito, who had died suddenly at the age of 55 on the seventh day of the tournament. Tokushōryū's shikona was based on Ito's name, as the two share the kanji character for "win."

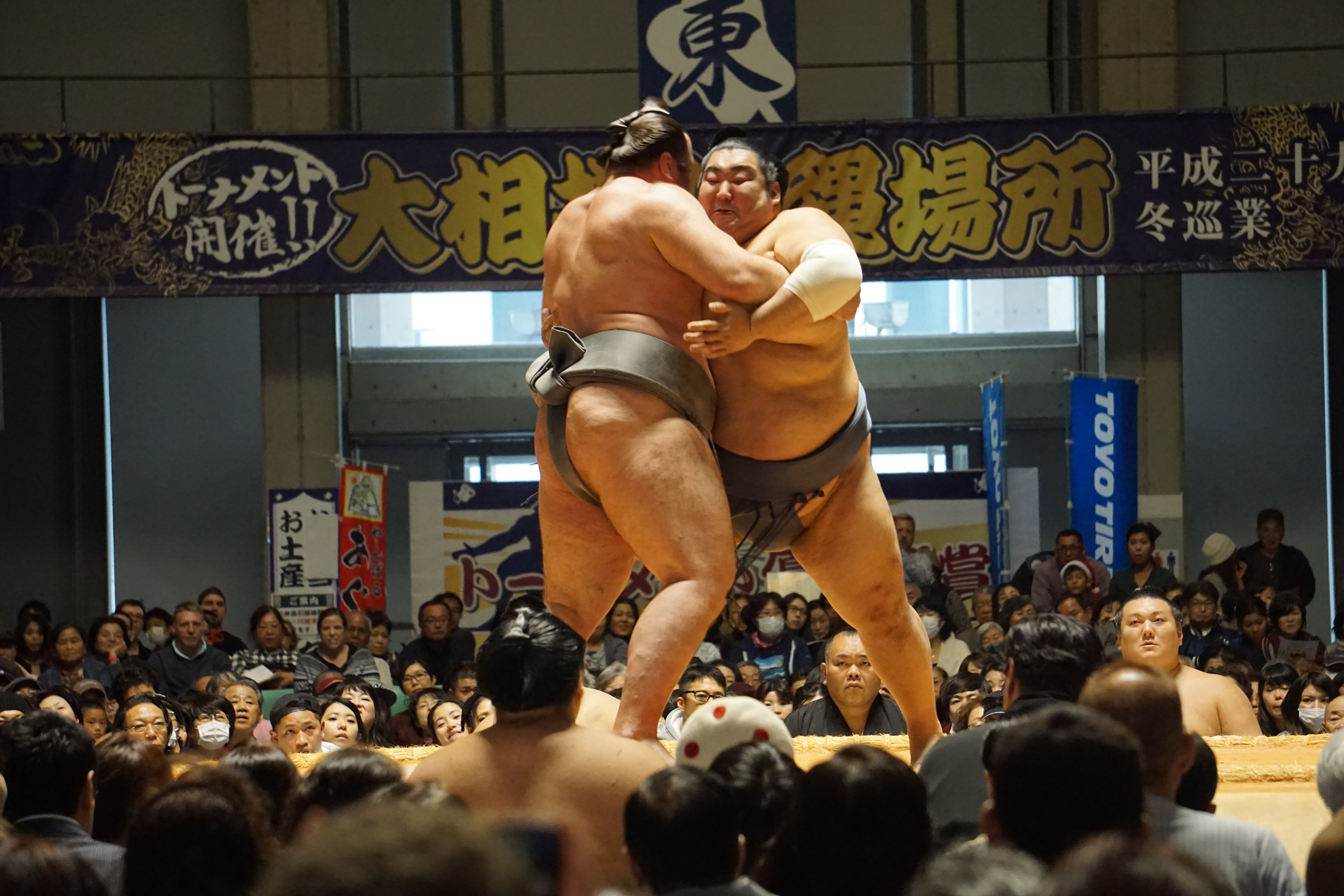
Tokushōryū grappling with Tochinoshin, December 2017

For the March 2020 tournament Tokushōryū was promoted to maegashira 2, his highest career ranking. He managed to earn a kinboshi by defeating Kakuryū on Day 6, his first win over a yokozuna, but ended the tournament with a 4–11 record. After maintaining a position in the mid-maegashira ranks for the rest of 2020, a 3–12 record at the rank of maegashira 8 in January 2021, five tournaments after his championship, saw him demoted to jūryō for the March 2021 tournament. This was the quickest demotion to jūryō ever after winning a makuuchi championship, surpassing Wakanami who was demoted after seven tournaments. Following the November 2022 tournament he was demoted once again, to makushita. During this tournament he had lost to Asanoyama in the first ever match in the jūryō division between two former makuuchi division tournament champions. Tokushōryū earned immediate promotion back to jūryō after the January 2023 tournament, but garnered a poor 4–11 record in the next one.

== Retirement ==
After two consecutive tournaments spent below sekitori status, it was reported on 11 September 2023 that Tokushōryū had decided to retire as a wrestler after deciding not to take part in that month's tournament. The Japan Sumo Association made the official announcement about Tokushōryū's retirement (intai) the following day. He initially remained with his stable by becoming a coach under the name Sendagawa, succeeding the recently retired Tōki.

Tokushōryū's official retirement ceremony was held at the Ryōgoku Kokugikan on 1 February 2025. Two months later, the Sumo Association announced that he had moved from Kise stable to coach at Nishikido stable.

== Fighting style ==
Tokushōryū was an oshi-sumo wrestler, preferring thrusting and pushing (tsuki/oshi) techniques to fighting on the mawashi or belt. His most common winning kimarite were yori-kiri (force out) and oshi-dashi (push out). While he was a member of Kitanoumi stable (2010–2012, while Kise stable was briefly dissolved), head coach Kitanoumi encouraged him to go for a left hand inside grip on the belt, hidari-yotsu, recognizing his power, and this is the technique he used in his championship winning match against Takakeisho in January 2020.

== Personal life ==
Tokushōryū was married in June 2016, with the wedding reception in February 2017.

== Career record ==
Tokushōryū Makoto
Year	January Hatsu basho, Tokyo	March Haru basho, Osaka	May Natsu basho, Tokyo	July Nagoya basho, Nagoya	September Aki basho, Tokyo	November Kyūshū basho, Fukuoka
2009	(Maezumo)	West Jonokuchi #22; 6–1; Champion	West Jonidan #55; 6–1	West Sandanme #87; 6–1	East Sandanme #29; 7–0; Champion	East Makushita #19; 6–1
2010	West Makushita #8; 5–2	East Makushita #4; 3–4	East Makushita #8; 3–4	East Makushita #17; 5–2	West Makushita #7; 5–2	East Makushita #2; 1–6
2011	West Makushita #16; 5–2	West Makushita #7; Tournament Cancelled; Match fixing investigation 0–0–0	West Makushita #7; 3–4	West Makushita #7; 4–3	East Makushita #1; 5–2	West Jūryō #11; 10–5
2012	East Jūryō #6; 2–13	West Makushita #2; 4–3	East Jūryō #13; 8–7	West Jūryō #10; 10–5	West Jūryō #4; 8–7	West Jūryō #3; 6–9
2013	East Jūryō #7; 9–6	East Jūryō #5; 7–8	East Jūryō #6; 12–3	East Maegashira #16; 9–6	East Maegashira #10; 6–9	West Maegashira #14; 7–8
2014	East Maegashira #15; 8–7	West Maegashira #11; 9–6	West Maegashira #7; 6–9	East Maegashira #10; 4–11	East Jūryō #1; 12–3	West Maegashira #9; 4–11
2015	East Maegashira #16; 11–4	West Maegashira #7; 8–7	West Maegashira #4; 6–9	West Maegashira #5; 7–8	West Maegashira #6; 6–9	East Maegashira #8; 8–7
2016	East Maegashira #6; 4–11	East Maegashira #12; 8–7	West Maegashira #10; 6–9	West Maegashira #12; 6–9	East Maegashira #15; 6–9	East Jūryō #3; 6–9
2017	East Jūryō #8; 11–4	West Maegashira #15; 8–7	East Maegashira #12; 8–7	East Maegashira #9; 4–11	East Maegashira #15; 4–11	East Jūryō #3; 6–9
2018	East Jūryō #5; 8–7	West Jūryō #4; 5–10	East Jūryō #10; 8–7	East Jūryō #9; 7–8	East Jūryō #11; 11–4–P; Champion	West Jūryō #3; 7–8
2019	West Jūryō #4; 7–8	West Jūryō #4; 9–6	East Maegashira #14; 4–11	East Jūryō #1; 7–8	East Jūryō #3; 8–7	West Jūryō #1; 8–7
2020	West Maegashira #17; 14–1; FO	West Maegashira #2; 4–11 ★	West Maegashira #7; Tournament Cancelled; State of Emergency; 0–0–0	West Maegashira #7; 7–8	East Maegashira #8; 7–8	East Maegashira #9; 8–7
2021	East Maegashira #8; 3–12	East Jūryō #1; 7–8	East Jūryō #2; 11–4	West Maegashira #15; 7–8	West Maegashira #16; 4–11	West Jūryō #6; 6–9
2022	East Jūryō #10; 9–6	West Jūryō #7; 7–8	East Jūryō #8; 9–6	West Jūryō #5; 5–10	West Jūryō #10; 7–8	East Jūryō #12; 4–11
2023	West Makushita #2; 4–3	East Jūryō #14; 4–11	West Makushita #6; 2–5	East Makushita #15; 1–6	West Makushita #37; Retired; 0–0–1	x
Record given as wins–losses–absences Top division champion Top division runner-up Retired Lower divisions Non-participation Sanshō key: F=Fighting spirit; O=Outstanding performance; T=Technique Also shown: ★=Kinboshi; P=Playoff(s); Divisions: Makuuchi — Jūryō — Makushita — Sandanme — Jonidan — Jonokuchi Makuuchi ranks: Yokozuna — Ōzeki — Sekiwake — Komusubi — Maegashira

== See also ==
- List of sumo tournament top division champions
- List of sumo tournament top division runners-up
- List of sumo tournament second division champions
- Glossary of sumo terms
- List of past sumo wrestlers
- List of sumo elders
