= Yoshikaze Masatsugu =

Japanese sumo wrestler

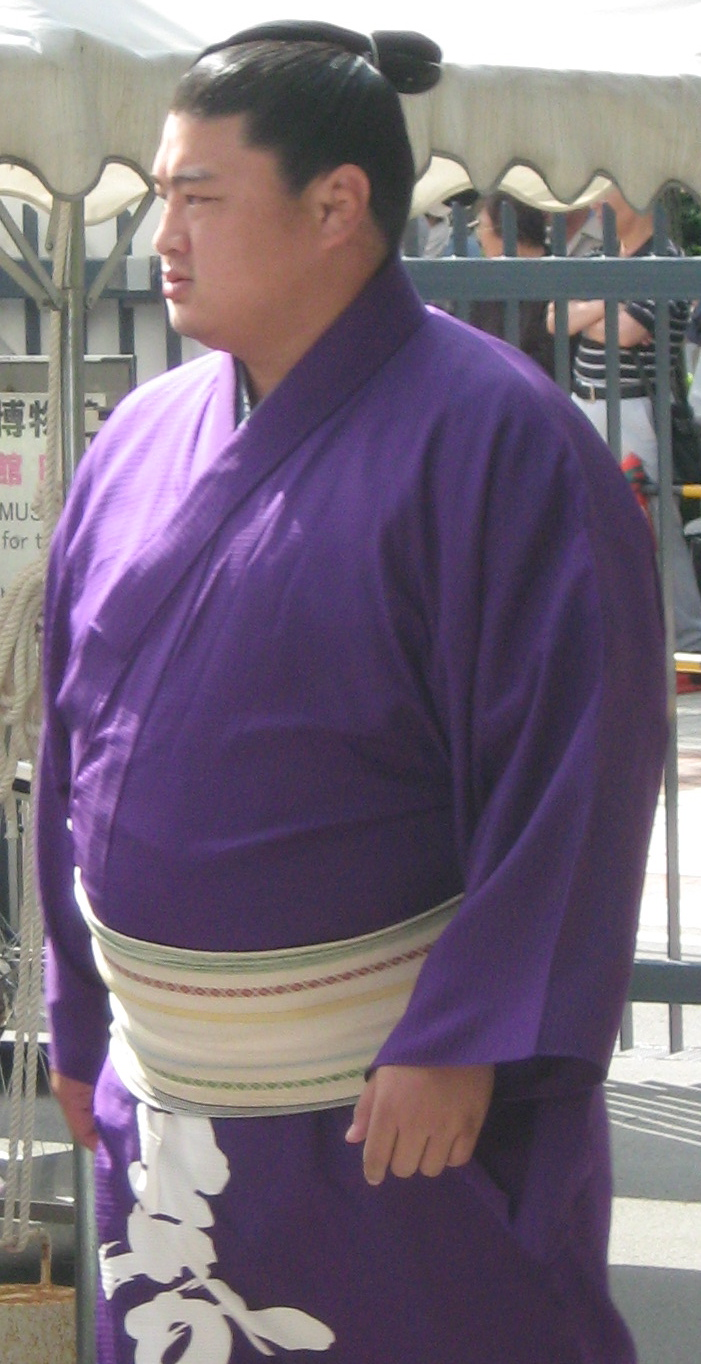

Personal information
- Native name: 嘉風 雅継
- Born: Masatsugu Ōnishi; March 19, 1982 (age 44) Oita, Japan
- Height: 1.77 m (5 ft 9 1/2 in)
- Weight: 148 kg (326 lb; 23.3 st)

Sport
- Sport: Sumo
- University team: Nippon Sport Science University
- Retired: September 2019
- Heya: Oguruma
- Record: 649–642–30
- Debut: January 2004
- Highest rank: Sekiwake (Jan 2016)
- Elder name: Nakamura
- Championships: 1 (Sandanme); 1 (Jonokuchi)
- Special Prizes: Fighting Spirit (4); Outstanding Performance (2); Technique (4)
- Gold Stars: 8 Kakuryū (3); Hakuhō (2); Harumafuji (2); Kisenosato (1)
- Updated on September 12, 2019

Yoshikaze Masatsugu (born March 19, 1982, as Masatsugu Ōnishi) is a former sumo wrestler from Saiki, Oita Prefecture, Japan. His highest rank was sekiwake. A former amateur sumo champion, he turned professional in 2004, reaching the top division two years later. Until his promotion to komusubi in May 2014 he had the active record for the longest serving makuuchi wrestler who had never reached a titled rank. His best performance in a tournament came in July 2015 when he was the runner-up and scored twelve wins against three losses. In the following tournament in September 2015 he defeated two yokozuna and won special prizes for Outstanding Performance and Technique. Yoshikaze is in second place for the slowest promotion from makuuchi debut to the third highest sekiwake rank in history, behind only his stablemate Takekaze. He won ten special prizes in total, and eight gold stars for defeating yokozuna. He retired in September 2019 and is now an elder of the Japan Sumo Association, known as Nakamura Oyakata.

== Early life and sumo background ==
He was an amateur sumo champion at Nippon Sport Science University, and won the college equivalent of the yokozuna title in his third year. Because he wanted to wait until after his graduation from university before joining professional sumo, he missed out on the chance to enter at the level of the third makushita division. He joined Oguruma stable and made his debut at maezumo level in January 2004, the first former amateur yokozuna to do so.

== Career ==
At the start of his career he was considerably older and more experienced than most of the competition there and quickly worked his way up the ranks, winning two tournament titles in the jonokuchi and sandanme divisions with perfect 7–0 records. He initially competed under his own surname of Ōnishi, but upon reaching the second highest jūryō division in July 2005 he changed his shikona to Yoshikaze. The Yoshi character came from his grandfather, Yoshio, who had died the previous year, and the kaze character was from his stablemaster and used by many of his stablemates.

He was promoted to the top makuuchi division in January 2006. It took him only 12 tournaments to make the top division from his professional debut, equal to the second fastest rise ever since the six tournaments per year system was introduced in 1958. However, until January 2009 he did not manage to rise above the mid maegashira ranks and twice fell back to the second division.

In the November 2007 tournament he defeated fan favourite Takamisakari with the rare but spectacular technique of utchari, or spin throw from the edge of the ring. However he was able to win only three other bouts in that tournament and fell to the bottom of the division. An 8–7 record in January 2008 kept him in makuuchi.

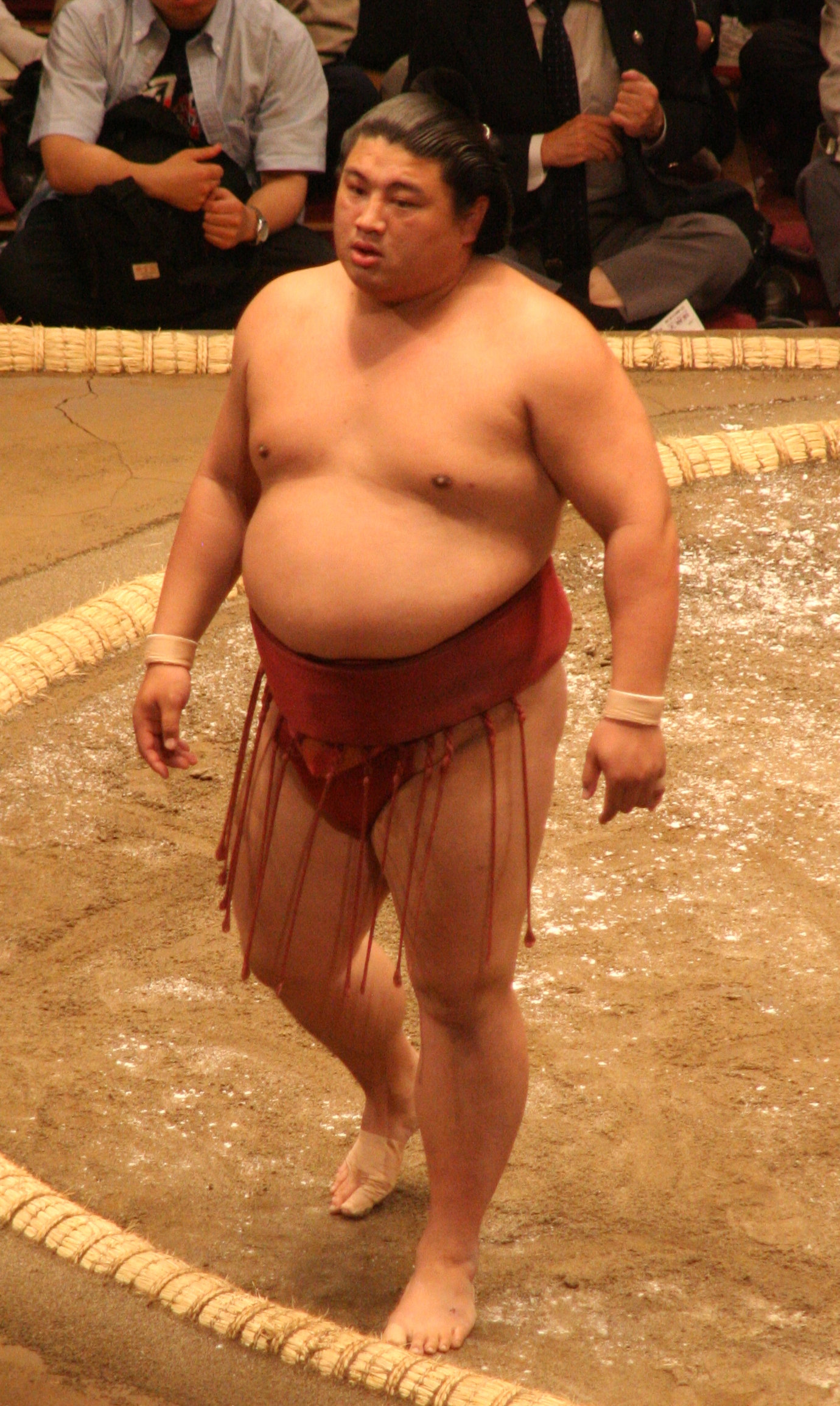
Yoshikaze in May 2009.

One of his best performance in the top division came in November 2008 when he won 11 bouts and was awarded his first sanshō or special prize, for Fighting Spirit. He was promoted to a new high of maegashira 2 for the January 2009 tournament. Although he was not able to come through with a winning record his score of 6–9 was creditable, and he scored a memorable win over new ōzeki Harumafuji on the opening day of the tournament. However, he gradually slipped back down the rankings with three more losing scores in the next three tournaments. The November 2009 tournament was one of his most successful, as he won nine of his first ten bouts before slowing down somewhat to finish on 10–5. In September 2010 he won his second Fighting Spirit prize, which was shared with his stablemate Takekaze, after producing a fine 11–4 score, having been 7–0. He followed up with a solid 8–7 record in November, which saw him return to maegashira 2 in January 2011, and he reached maegashira 1 that July.

In March 2014 Yoshikaze scored 10–5 from maegashira 4. This not only saw him win his third Fighting Spirit Prize, but also guaranteed him promotion to the san'yaku ranks for the first time, as all the maegashira above him on the banzuke had losing scores. His promotion to komusubi in the May 2014 tournament ended his record as the active wrestler with the longest career in makuuchi without ever making a san'yaku appearance (47 tournaments). He managed a 6–9 at this rank, and though this would lead to a demotion, it is considered relatively strong showing for a wrestler debuting at this challenging rank. In the following July tournament in Nagoya, he defeated yokozuna Harumafuji for the second tournament in a row, this time earning his first kinboshi as he was back in the maegashira ranks. He added a second kinboshi in September by beating Kakuryū but ended the tournament with a losing record and withdrew from the November tournament after winning only four of his first twelve matches.

In early 2015 Yoshikaze dropped to maegashira 14 after losing records in five of the last six tournaments. He recovered in May however, with a 10–5 result and then produced a career-best makuuchi score at Nagoya in July, finishing with 12–3 and earning a fourth Fighting Spirit prize. His excellent form continued in September 2015 when his eleven wins from maegashira 1 included victories over both competing yokozuna, Hakuhō and Kakūryū. He was additionally awarded the special prizes for Outstanding Performance and Technique. Yoshikaze returned to the rank of komusubi for the November 2015 tournament and defeated Kakūryū for the second time in a row on the opening day. He went on to post wins over both sekiwake and the ōzeki Gōeidō to end the tournament with an 8–7 record. He was awarded the special prize for Technique for the second consecutive tournament. His efforts saw him promoted to the rank of sekiwake for the first time, 59 tournaments after his top division debut. This is the second slowest in history, behind only fellow Oguruma stable member Takekaze, who took 68 tournaments to reach sekiwake.

Yoshikaze achieved a majority of wins in his debut at sekiwake, but lost the rank after the following tournament where he could only score 4–11. He earned his fifth career gold star in the July 2016 tournament by defeating Harumafuji for the eighth time in thirteen meetings. Despite suffering from facial injuries he ended the tournament with a 10–5 record and was awarded the special prize for Outstanding Performance. In the March 2017 tournament he earned his sixth kinboshi by defeating Kakuryū on Day 10. Returning to the sanyaku ranks at komusubi in May 2017, he defeated two yokozuna, Kisenosato and Kakuryū, in the first four days, and received his third Technique Prize at the end of the tournament. He produced another good performance in July 2017, beating Harumafuji on the opening day and ending with a 9–6 record: he was in consideration for another Technique prize before losing to the in-form Aoiyama on the final day. This returned him to sekiwake rank for the first time since March 2016. He became the fifth oldest wrestler post World War II to earn promotion to sekiwake at 35 years, 5 months. He was demoted from sekiwake after the November 2017 tournament, but back in the maegashira ranks in January 2018 he defeated two yokozuna on consecutive days – Hakuhō on Day 4 and Kisenosato on Day 5. After having surgery on a knee injury in June 2019, he announced that he would miss the July 2019 tournament, resulting in a fall to jūryō for the first time since 2007.

== Retirement from sumo ==
In February 2013 Yoshikaze acquired the Nakamura toshiyori kabu or elder stock from the former Fujizakura, indicating that he intended to stay in sumo as a coach upon his retirement. On the fifth day of the September 2019 tournament, with his continuing absence making demotion to the makushita division certain, he submitted his retirement papers to the Japan Sumo Association. It was reported in October 2019 that his career-ending knee injury was caused by a canyoning accident in his native Saiki, and that as he was unable to reach an amicable settlement with his hometown, he was suing Saiki for damages as he regarded the canyoning as a PR event for the town. In January 2022 it was announced that due to the imminent closure of Oguruma stable he would be transferring to the Nishonoseki stable.

Yoshikaze's danpatsu-shiki, or official retirement ceremony, was held on 5 February 2022. Around 250 people took part in the hair-cutting ceremony, including fellow Nippon Sport Science University graduates Hokutofuji and Myōgiryū, Ikazuchi oyakata (the former Kakizoe, also from Ōita Prefecture), Nishonoseki oyakata (former yokozuna Kisenosato) and Oshiogawa oyakata (former stablemate Takekaze).

After the May 2024 tournament, the Sumo Association granted the request of Yoshikaze to branch off from Nishonoseki stable for the purposes of creating his own stable. Wrestlers transferring to the new Nakamura stable included then-maegashira Tomokaze as well as Kayō, who had just been promoted to the second-highest jūryō division.

== Fighting style ==
Yoshikaze's favourite techniques are listed at the Sumo Association as tsuki/oshi, meaning he preferred pushing and thrusting moves as opposed to fighting on the opponent's mawashi or belt. His most common winning techniques were oshidashi, the push out, and yorikiri, the force out.

== Family ==
Yoshikaze was married in December 2008, and the wedding ceremony was held in October 2009. He has two children, a daughter and a son. It was reported in November 2020 that he had separated from his wife, which at the time could have impacted his ability to eventually run his own stable. In March 2021 his ex-wife was arrested on charges of physical abuse of their daughter.

== Career record ==
Yoshikaze Masatsugu
Year	January Hatsu basho, Tokyo	March Haru basho, Osaka	May Natsu basho, Tokyo	July Nagoya basho, Nagoya	September Aki basho, Tokyo	November Kyūshū basho, Fukuoka
2004	(Maezumo)	West Jonokuchi #27; 7–0; Champion	East Jonidan #23; 6–1	West Sandanme #60; 6–1	East Sandanme #6; 7–0–P; Champion	West Makushita #11; 3–4
2005	West Makushita #16; 6–1	West Makushita #5; 4–3	East Makushita #3; 5–2	West Jūryō #13; 10–4–1	West Jūryō #7; 8–7	West Jūryō #5; 10–5
2006	West Maegashira #13; 5–10	West Maegashira #16; 8–7	West Maegashira #14; 9–6	East Maegashira #9; 6–9	East Maegashira #12; 5–10	East Jūryō #1; 8–7
2007	West Maegashira #13; 8–7	West Maegashira #12; 5–10	East Jūryō #1; 8–7	East Maegashira #13; 6–9	West Maegashira #15; 10–5	West Maegashira #10; 4–11
2008	West Maegashira #15; 8–7	West Maegashira #12; 6–9	West Maegashira #14; 7–8	East Maegashira #15; 8–7	East Maegashira #11; 7–8	East Maegashira #12; 11–4; F
2009	West Maegashira #2; 6–9	West Maegashira #4; 7–8	West Maegashira #5; 4–11	West Maegashira #12; 6–9	East Maegashira #15; 9–6	East Maegashira #9; 10–5
2010	East Maegashira #5; 6–9	West Maegashira #9; 5–10	East Maegashira #13; 9–6	West Maegashira #8; 5–10	West Maegashira #11; 11–4; F	East Maegashira #5; 8–7
2011	West Maegashira #2; 4–11	West Maegashira #7; Tournament Cancelled; Match fixing investigation 0–0–0	West Maegashira #7; 9–6	West Maegashira #1; 7–8	West Maegashira #2; 6–9	West Maegashira #5; 7–8
2012	East Maegashira #6; 9–6	West Maegashira #2; 3–10–2	West Maegashira #9; 8–7	East Maegashira #8; 7–8	East Maegashira #10; 7–8	West Maegashira #10; 8–7
2013	East Maegashira #8; 7–8	West Maegashira #9; 9–6	East Maegashira #6; 7–8	West Maegashira #7; 7–8	West Maegashira #8; 6–5–4	East Maegashira #13; 8–7
2014	West Maegashira #11; 10–5	East Maegashira #4; 10–5; F	East Komusubi #1; 6–9	West Maegashira #2; 7–8 ★	West Maegashira #3; 7–8 ★	West Maegashira #4; 4–8–3
2015	West Maegashira #11; 8–7	East Maegashira #9; 5–10	East Maegashira #14; 10–5	East Maegashira #8; 12–3; F	West Maegashira #1; 11–4; OT★★	West Komusubi; 8–7; T
2016	West Sekiwake #1; 8–7	East Sekiwake #1; 4–11	East Maegashira #4; 7–8	West Maegashira #5; 10–5; O★	West Maegashira #1; 7–8	West Maegashira #2; 6–9
2017	West Maegashira #5; 8–7	East Maegashira #4; 8–7 ★	West Komusubi #1; 8–7; T	East Komusubi #1; 9–6	West Sekiwake #1; 8–7; T	West Sekiwake #1; 6–9
2018	East Maegashira #2; 4–11 ★★	West Maegashira #7; 7–8	East Maegashira #8; 8–7	West Maegashira #5; 2–13	West Maegashira #15; 11–4	West Maegashira #4; 7–8
2019	West Maegashira #5; 3–12	West Maegashira #12; 10–5	West Maegashira #6; 4–11	East Maegashira #11; Sat out due to injury 0–0–15	West Jūryō #7; Retired; 0–0–5	x
Record given as wins–losses–absences Top division champion Top division runner-up Retired Lower divisions Non-participation Sanshō key: F=Fighting spirit; O=Outstanding performance; T=Technique Also shown: ★=Kinboshi; P=Playoff(s); Divisions: Makuuchi — Jūryō — Makushita — Sandanme — Jonidan — Jonokuchi Makuuchi ranks: Yokozuna — Ōzeki — Sekiwake — Komusubi — Maegashira

== See also ==
- List of sumo tournament top division runners-up
- Glossary of sumo terms
- List of past sumo wrestlers
- List of sekiwake
