= Nishonoseki stable =

Nishonoseki stable may refer to:

- Nishonoseki stable (1911–2013)
- Nishonoseki stable (2014–2021), presently known as Hanaregoma stable
- Nishonoseki stable (active)
