= Nakamura stable =

Nakamura stable may refer to:

- Nakamura stable (active), a professional sumo stable opened by the former Yoshikaze
- Nakamura stable (1986–2013), a former sumo stable run by the former Fujizakura
