= Kakuryū Rikisaburō =

Japanese sumo wrestler

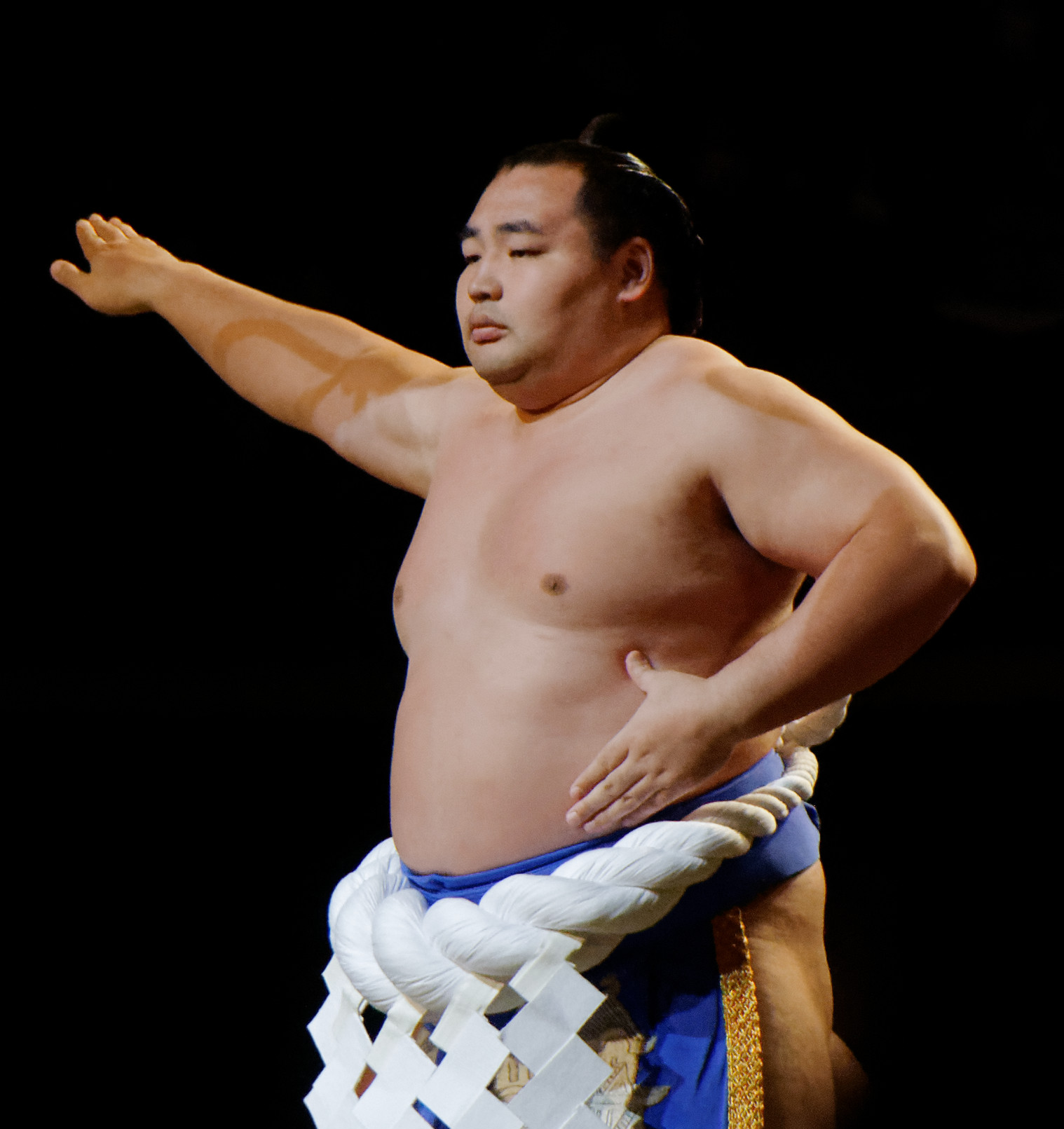
- Kakuryū in April 2017

Personal information
- Native name: 鶴竜 力三郎
- Born: Mangaljalavyn Anand; August 10, 1985 (age 41) Mongolia
- Height: 1.86 m (6 ft 1 in)
- Weight: 154 kg (340 lb; 24.3 st)

Sport
- Sport: Sumo
- Retired: March 24, 2021
- Heya: Izutsu → Michinoku
- Record: 785-497-231
- Debut: November, 2001
- Highest rank: Yokozuna (March, 2014)
- Elder name: Otowayama
- Championships: 6 (Makuuchi); 1 (Sandanme)
- Special Prizes: Technique (7), Outstanding Performance (2)
- Updated on 24 March 2021

Kakuryū Rikisaburō (Japanese: 鶴竜 力三郎; pronounced [kaꜜkɯɾʲɯː ɾiki̥saꜜbɯɾoː], born August 10, 1985 as Mangaljalavyn Anand Mongolian: Мангалжалавын Ананд, Mongolian pronunciation: [ˈmaŋ.ɢəɮ.dʒə.ɮə.w̜iːŋ ˈa.nənt]) is a former professional sumo wrestler from Sükhbaatar Province, Mongolia. He was a member of the top makuuchi division from November 2006 until his retirement in March 2021, and was the 71st yokozuna in history.

He reached the third highest sekiwake rank in July 2009, and in March 2012 he secured promotion to the second highest rank of ōzeki after finishing runner-up to yokozuna Hakuhō and accumulating a total of 33 wins in his previous three tournaments. After scoring 14 wins against one loss in both of the first two tournaments of 2014, and claiming the yūshō in the second, he was promoted to yokozuna. He won his second tournament as a yokozuna, a playoff win over Terunofuji in September 2015, but did not win more than 12 bouts in a tournament at yokozuna rank until winning his third tournament in November 2016.

Injury problems meant that he was able to complete only one tournament in 2017 but he returned to fitness in 2018 and won his fourth and fifth championships in March and May. He won a sixth championship in July 2019. He has also been a runner-up on eight occasions. In 2020 he obtained Japanese citizenship and changed his name to Mangarajarabu Ananda (マンガラジャラブ・アナンダ). He announced his retirement on March 24, 2021. He is an elder in the Japan Sumo Association under the name of Otowayama (音羽山).

== Early life and sumo background ==
Kakuryū Rikisaburō was born August 10, 1985, as Mangaljalavyn Anand. His father was a university professor. He grew up dreaming of professional basketball, not sumo. At age 14, he decided to devote himself to sumo after seeing a tournament featuring fellow Mongolians Kyokutenhō and Kyokushūzan on TV. He wrote a letter about his desires and had a friend translate it into Japanese. He then mailed the letter to several stables in Japan. Izutsu stable's head was impressed and invited Kakuryū to Japan. Kakuryū's family had no background in Mongolian wrestling, and he had no experience in wrestling before coming to Japan.

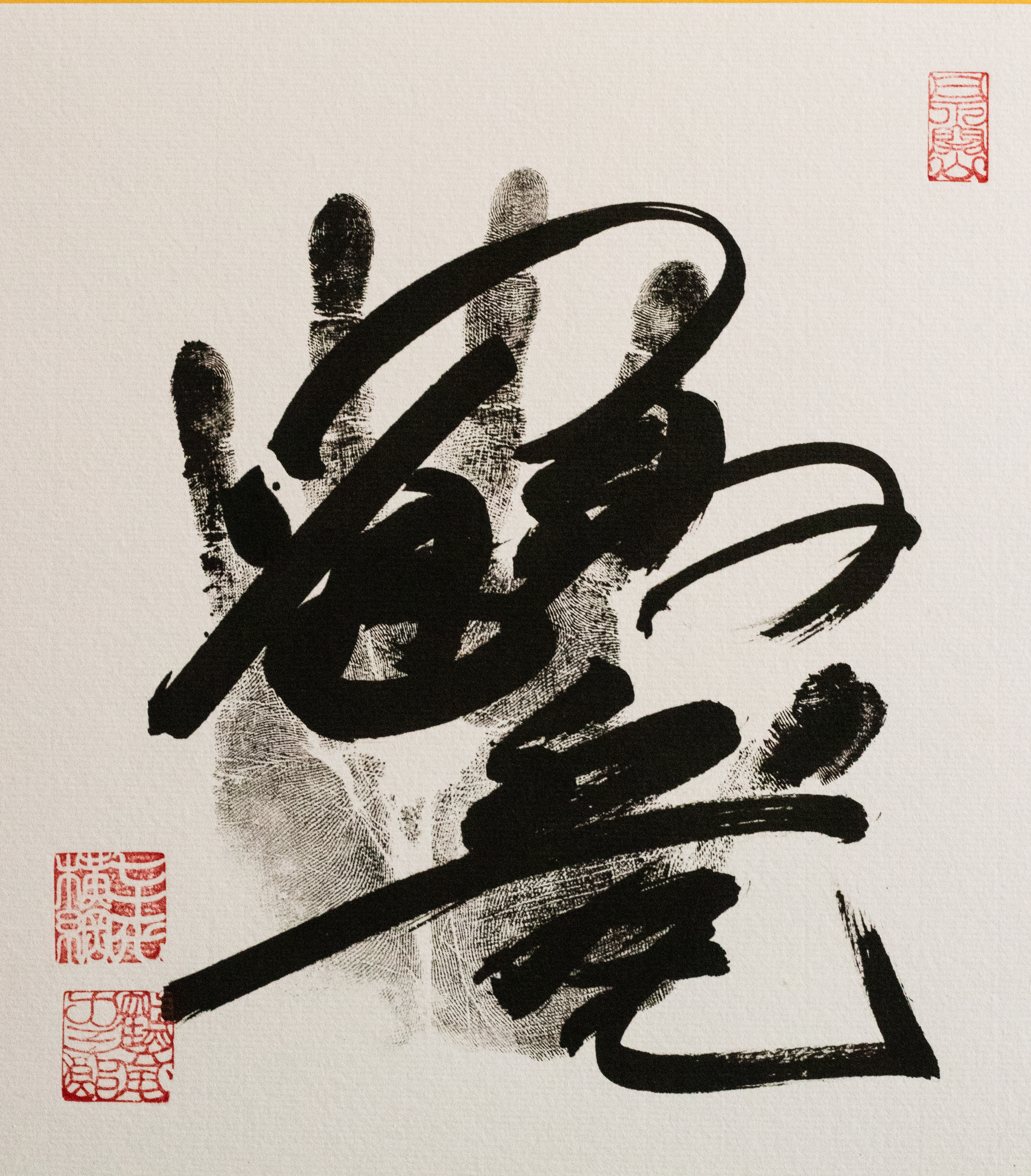
Kakuryu original Yokozuna tegata (handprint & signature)

== Career ==
When Kakuryū joined Izutsu stable, he weighed just 65 kg (143 lb) and his oyakata former sekiwake Sakahoko joked he was better suited to be the stable's tokoyama (hairdresser) than a wrestler. Kakuryū made his professional debut at the Kyushu Grand Sumo Tournament in November 2001, then weighing 82 kg (181 lb). After reaching the fourth highest sandanme division fairly quickly, he struggled, being demoted back to jonidan twice. After 17 tournaments, he finally won the sandanme championship in July 2004 with a 7–0 record and earned promotion to the makushita division.

Kakuryū first reached sekitori status in November 2005 upon promotion to the jūryō division but fell short with a 5–10 record, dropping back to makushita. He returned to the second division in March 2006 and reached the top makuuchi division that November, after scoring 9 wins at the rank of jūryō 1 in the previous tournament. He was the eighth Mongolian to make makuuchi after Kyokushūzan, Kyokutenhō, Asashōryū, Asasekiryū, Hakuhō, Harumafuji and Tokitenkū. He was the first (and to date only) wrestler from the stable to make the top division since the current stablemaster took control in 1994. One of seven wrestlers to be promoted to makuuchi for that tournament, he made his debut halfway up the maegashira ranks at number 8, the highest since Miyabiyama began at maegashira 7 in March 1999. He came through with a solid 8–7 record.

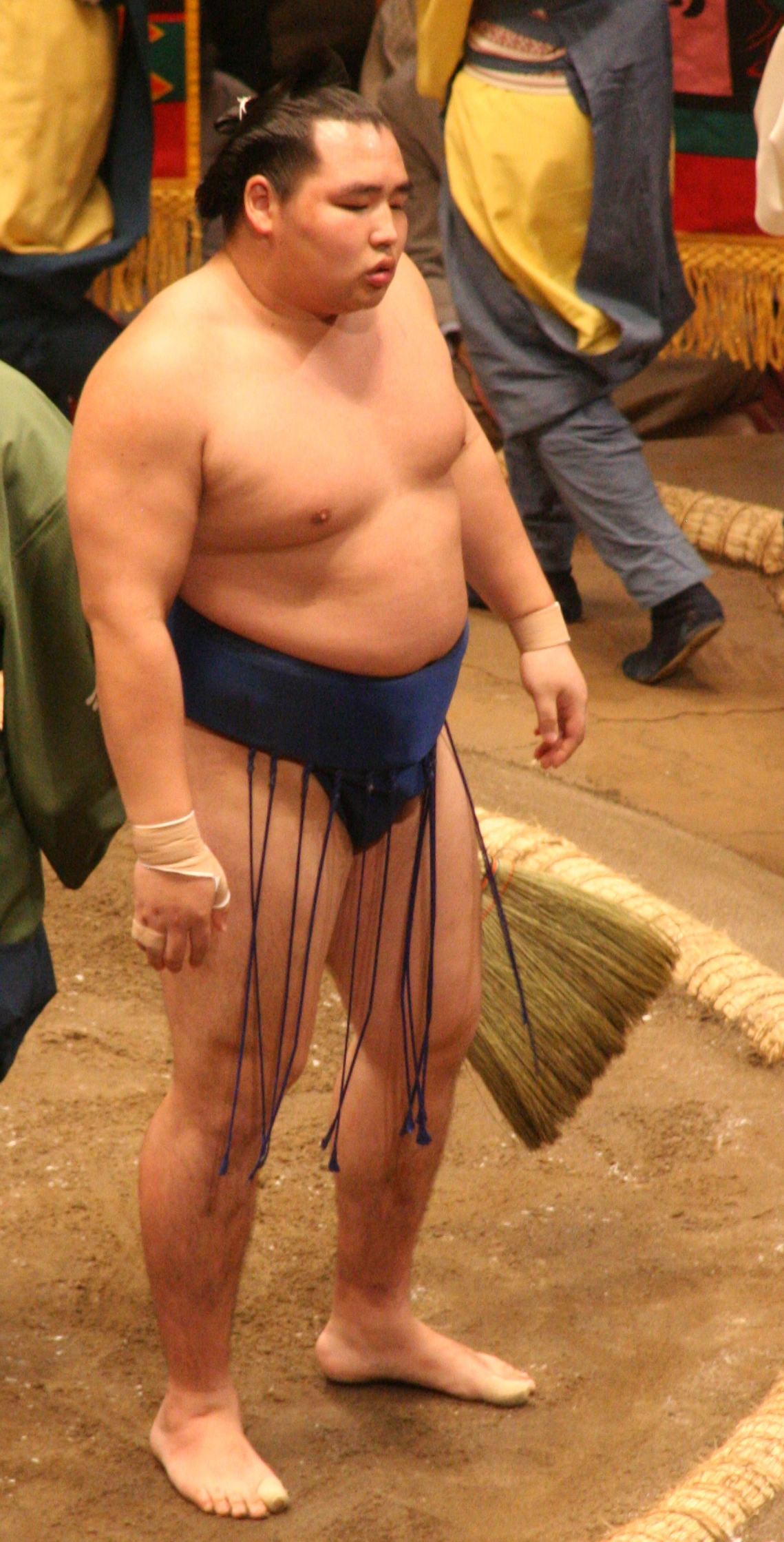
Kakuryū in May 2009

After a strong 11–4 record in January 2008, which earned him his first sanshō for technique, Kakuryū was promoted to maegashira 1. He was forced to withdraw during the November 2008 tournament after spraining his knee, marking the first time in his career that he had missed any bouts. In March 2009 he produced a fine 10–5 record from the maegashira 1 ranking, defeating three ōzeki. He won his last eight matches after standing at 2–5 on the seventh day. He was awarded his second Technique Prize. Kakuryū made his san'yaku debut in the following tournament in May 2009 at the rank of komusubi. In a similar fashion to his previous tournament he recovered from 2–5 down to win seven of his last eight bouts and was rewarded with another Technique Prize.

In July 2009 Kakuryū was promoted to sekiwake. He was the first from his stable to do so since Terao in 1989. He was only able to win five bouts in his sekiwake debut and fell back to the maegashira ranks. He responded with a strong 11–4 score, earning his third Technique prize in four tournaments and fourth overall. He returned to the sekiwake rank for the November tournament and finished with a 7–8 record that kept him in the san'yaku ranks. Disappointing performances in his next three tournaments saw him slip to maegashira 6, but he responded by winning eleven bouts in July 2010, finishing as joint runner-up and winning his fifth Technique award. He returned to komusubi in September 2010 and moved up to sekiwake in November. On the final day of that tournament, he was defeated by fellow sekiwake Tochiōzan to finish 7–8.

Ranked at komusubi in the May 2011 "technical examination" tournament, Kakuryū finished runner-up for the second time with a 12–3 record, winning his sixth Technique prize. Promoted to sekiwake for the July tournament, he defeated three ōzeki and finished 10–5. In a strong position for possible promotion to ōzeki, Kakuryū started that next tournament 3–4. His final record of 9–6 was insufficient to earn a promotion.

In the January 2012 tournament, Kakuryū defeated yokozuna Hakuhō for the first time, and was awarded his first Outstanding Performance Prize. It was his first victory over a yokozuna in 27 attempts (previously he had been 0–20 against Hakuhō and 0–6 against Asashōryū).

=== Ōzeki ===
In the March 2012 tournament held in Osaka, Kakuryū defeated Hakuhō for the second time in a row on Day 9, and entered the final day of the tournament one win ahead of the yokozuna at 13–1, his only loss thus far being to Kisenosato on Day 8. However, he was defeated by Gōeidō, and Hakuhō's defeat of Baruto ensured a playoff between the two Mongolians. Hakuhō gained revenge on Kakuryū to claim his 22nd tournament title. Although he missed out on his first championship, Kakuryū received prizes for Outstanding performance and Technique. Kakuryū said that inexperience cost him in his playoff against Hakuhō and that a tournament victory was "too soon for me." Kakuryū's 33 wins over three tournaments was, however, enough to grant him a promotion to ōzeki. The promotion marked the first time there were six active ōzeki simultaneously. It took him 62 tournaments from his professional debut to make ōzeki, which was the tenth slowest in sumo history, and the slowest of the nine foreigners who have made the rank.

=== Yokozuna ===
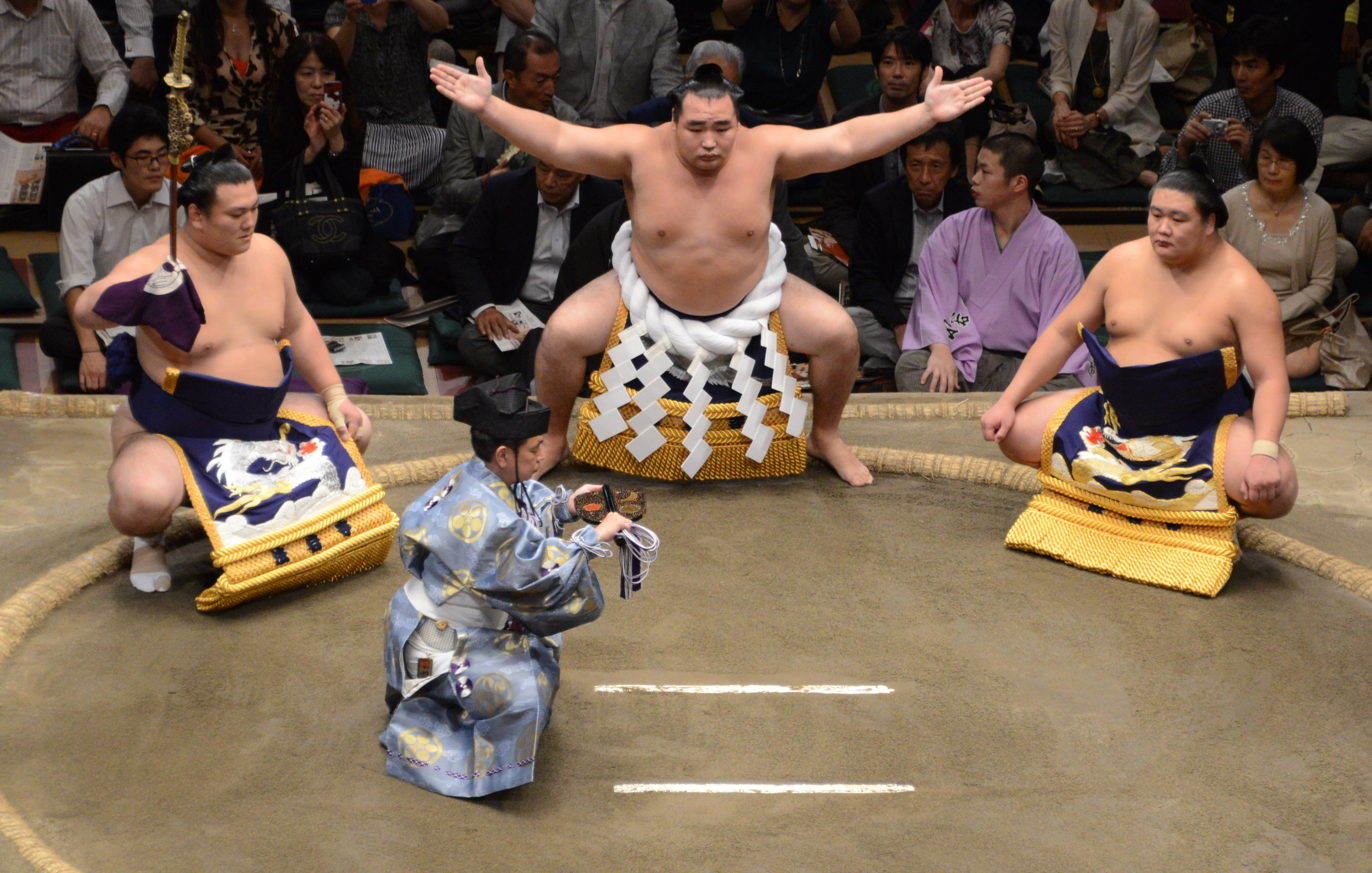
Yokozuna Kakuryū Rikisaburō performing a dohyō-iri (2014)

After an unremarkable 2013, in which he scored no better than ten wins in any of the six tournaments, Kakuryū surprised many observers with a 14–1 performance in January 2014, defeating Hakuhō in their regulation match and only losing the title in a playoff against him on the final day. It was the fourth runner-up title of his career. He followed it up with a 14–1 record in March 2014, defeating both Hakuhō and Harumafuji en route to the Spring Grand Sumo Tournament title. It was his first top division yūshō. Having satisfied the minimum requirement of two consecutive championships or "the equivalent", the Yokozuna Deliberation Council unanimously recommended his promotion on 24 March, which was confirmed by the Japan Sumo Association on 26 March. Kakuryū was the first to achieve the rank since Harumafuji in 2012, the fourth Mongolian to do so, the sixth foreign-born yokozuna, and 71st overall. "I am determined to focus all my efforts to train even harder and be certain to give all my strength not to defile the yokozuna name," he remarked. As a yokozuna, he performed the Unryū-gata style.

His first tournament as a yokozuna ended in disappointment as he gave up an early kinboshi to Endō on Day 4 and lost his last three matches to finish on 9–6. He fared better in subsequent tournaments in 2014, scoring at least 11 wins in each, and was in contention for the November 2014 tournament championship before losing to Hakuhō in the final bout. This was his fifth career runner-up performance.

Kakuryū was forced to withdraw on the eve of the March 2015 tournament, after suffering a torn rotator cuff in his left shoulder. This was his first absence as a yokozuna and came so late that his opening match had already been drawn up and had to be forfeited. He also sat out the summer Natsu basho in May as the injury had not fully healed, the first time a yokozuna has missed two full tournaments in a row since Musashimaru missed three in 2003. He made a respectable comeback in the July tournament, scoring 12–3 and being in contention for the championship until his defeat to Hakuhō on the final day. With Harumafuji absent and Hakuhō pulling out on the third day, Kakuryū was the only yokozuna for most of the September tournament. He recovered from losses to Yoshikaze on day 2 and Myōgiryū on day 10 to enter the final day on 12–2, one win ahead of the ōzeki Terunofuji. In the final scheduled match of the tournament, he was beaten by Terunofuji but won the ensuing playoff by uwatedashinage to take his second championship and his first since his promotion to yokozuna. After the playoff he commented; "The fact that I have long been away from a title has weighed on me. It was tough... I thought I might lose a title once again, but then I came to think that all I needed to do was to execute my style of sumo... I feel rewarded for continuing to work hard without getting down on myself." Despite his success he received some criticism for using the henka, a side-stepping technique, during the tournament, notably against Kisenosato on the penultimate day. In November he never looked likely to win the tournament but ended with a 9–6 record after beating Hakuhō on the final day.

Kakuryū began 2016 with 10–5 records in January and March, and did slightly better in May with an 11–4 record. He withdrew from the July 2016 tournament in Nagoya after suffering injuries to his lower back and left ankle. He returned in September and recorded ten wins. In the November tournament he won his first ten matches before losing to Kisenosato on day 11. He rebounded to beat Kotoshōgiku and Hakuhō before securing his third yūshō with a win over Gōeidō on day 14. After rounding off his tournament with a win over Harumafuji on the final day he commented "It’s really pleasing, I’ve been struggling with injuries for the past one, two years and physically and mentally things didn’t come together, but I didn’t sulk and it’s great that things turned out like this. I feel I’m finally getting to wrestle my way, relaxed. I’ll not forget how I’m feeling now and keep working."

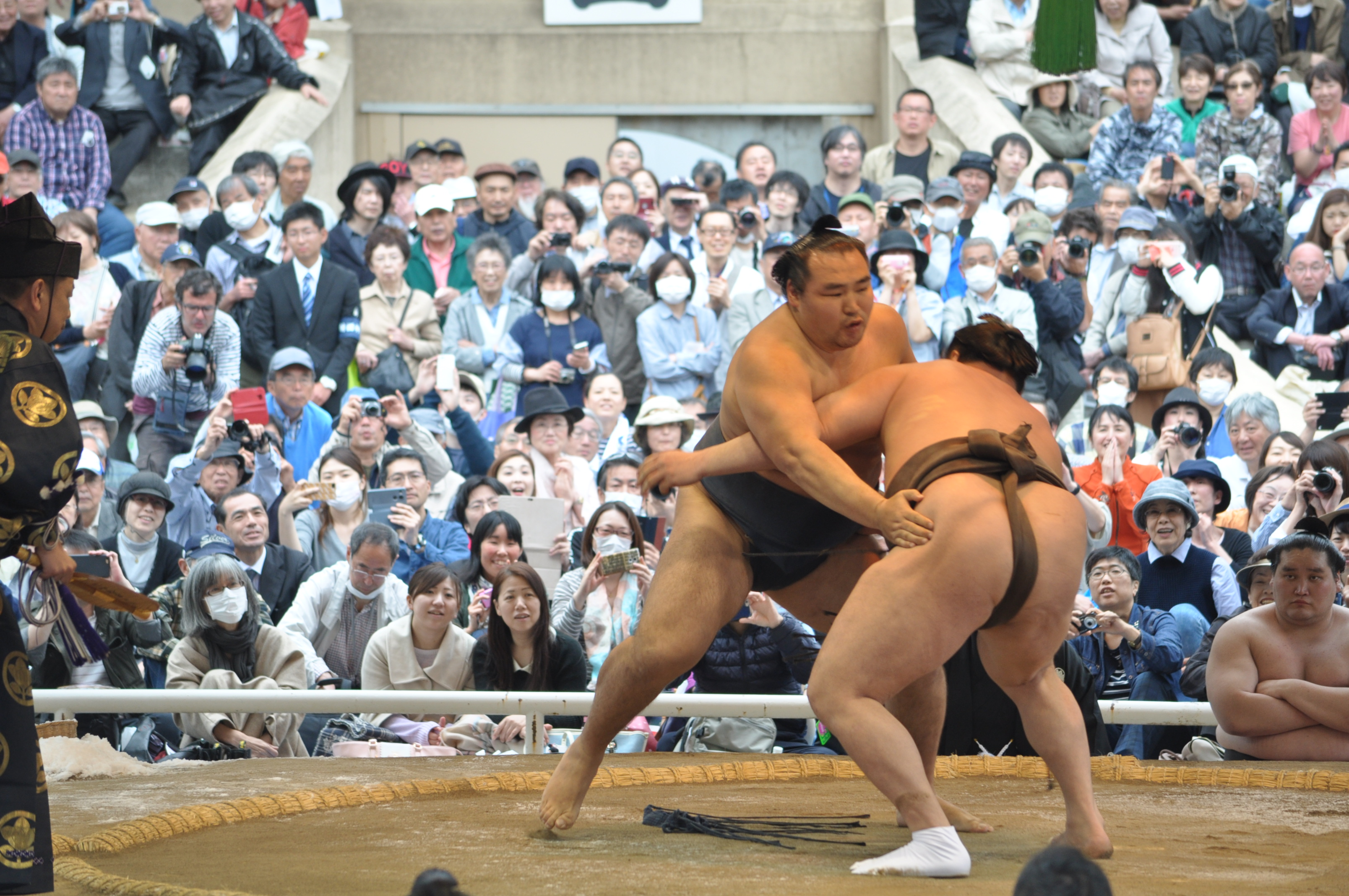
Kakuryū versus Hakuhō during a ceremonial tournament at Yasukuni Shrine, April 2017

2017 began disappointingly as Kakuryū suffered five defeats in the first ten days, including three kinboshi given up to maegashira ranked wrestlers. Kakuryū withdrew after Day 10 from the tournament with an injury to his right leg. He returned with ten wins in the Osaka tournament in March. He pulled out of the May 2017 tournament after three losses in the first four days, citing a left ankle injury. He also withdrew from the following tournament in July on Day 4, this time with an injury to his right foot. His stablemaster Izutsu said that Kakuryū would not pull out of a tournament upon his return and would have to retire instead – "If he can’t win next time he steps on the dohyo, there will be no option to pull out midway. He would have to take the decision (to retire from the sport) as a man." On September 7, 2017, Izutsu Oyakata confirmed that Kakuryū would miss the Aki tournament as he has yet to recover from his right foot injury. In November he was again forced to withdraw shortly before the tournament, this time owing to a lower back problem in addition to his ankle injury. On December 20, 2017, the Sumo Association announced that he was being docked his salary for January 2018 for failing to act when Mongolian wrestler Takanoiwa was injured by Harumafuji at a restaurant and bar in Tottori in October. Fellow yokozuna Hakuhō was docked a month and a half's pay. The chairman of the Yokozuna Deliberation Council said, "Hakuho and Kakuryu were not able to stop the incident from happening and being taken too far. Their responsibility should not be taken lightly. They should be given a strong warning."

Kakuryū made his comeback at the January 2018 tournament. After winning his first ten bouts, he then lost four in a row, but won on the last day to finish in third place with an 11–4 record. He was the only yokozuna to complete the tournament after Hakuhō and Kisenosato withdrew with injuries. Having felt pain in his left ankle towards the end of the tournament, he underwent surgery in early February to remove loose cartilage. In the March 2018 Tournament, Kakuryū was once again the only yokozuna to compete. He won 11 straight days, before suffering defeat in his match against Tochinoshin. Kakuryū then won his next two matches, and ensured his tournament championship in his win against Gōeidō on day 14. On day 15 Kakuryū faced Takayasu, the initial ruling was that Kakuryū had won, however a judge's conference was called to review the ruling since it had been close. They decided to have a rematch since Kakuryū's heel had gone out at the same time that the top of Takayasu's foot touched the ring. In the rematch, Takayasu won. Kakuryū finished the tournament with a 13–2 record, this was his fourth championship. In the May 2018 tournament Kakuryū won consecutive championships for the first time, losing only to maegashira Shōhōzan and finishing one win ahead of Tochinoshin with a 14–1 record. However he pulled out of the following tournament in July through injury on Day 6. In September he appeared to be in excellent form and won his first ten bouts but after losing to Tochinoshin on day 11, he failed to win again and ended with a 10–5 record. He did little training in the run-up to the November 2018 tournament, affected by the right ankle injury that he first suffered in July 2017. He confirmed on November 8 that he would be withdrawing from the tournament. The same injury resulted in him pulling out of the January 2019 tournament on Day 6 with a 2–3 record. After 10-5 and 11-4 records in the March and May tournaments, Kakuryū won his sixth career top division championship in the July tournament with a 14–1 record. Kakuryū clinched the yūshō with a final-day win over fellow yokozuna Hakuhō.

In the September 2019 tournament he won his first four matches but lost three in a row to maegashira Asanoyama, Daieishō and Tomokaze and withdrew on Day 8 because of a left knee injury. He moved to the Michinoku stable after the tournament, following the death of his stablemaster Izutsu Oyakata, the former Sakahoko. He withdrew on the morning of the opening day of the Kyushu tournament in November after suffering a back injury in training. He pulled out on Day 5 of the January 2020 tournament with a record of one win against three losses, the third straight tournament he failed to complete.

Kakuryū was designated as yokozuna-ōzeki on the March 2020 banzuke after just one other wrestler remained at the ōzeki rank. It was the first time in 38 years that the yokozuna-ōzeki designation was used. He was a runner-up for the eighth time in this tournament with a 12–3 record.

Kakuryū pulled out of the July 2020 tournament on Day 2 with an elbow injury after injuring himself in his opening match, a defeat to Endō. He was absent from the following September tournament as well and his stablemaster said, "We've reached a stage where the question of retirement cannot be avoided. He announced that he would miss the November tournament due to his long-standing lower back injury. This was his sixth withdrawal in his last seven tournaments. Following the November 2020 basho, Kakuryū - along with fellow yokozuna Hakuhō - were issued warnings by the Sumo Association's Yokozuna Deliberation Council due to lack of participation in recent sumo tournaments. This is the middle of three notices that the council can issue between a letter of encouragement and a recommendation for retirement. It is the first time in history that warning notices have been issued.

=== Retirement ===
Despite having previously been warned, Kakuryū withdrew from the January 2021 tournament due to lower back issues. According to his stablemaster Michinoku, Kakuryū said he would be putting his career on the line at the next tournament, and said he would be working to regain his fitness so that he could resume training as early as possible. Having withdrawn from four straight tournaments, Kakuryū initially told reporters that he would compete in March, but withdrew the following week because of a muscle strain in his left leg. His stablemaster said that he was not planning to retire.

Facing a potential of further condemnation by the Yokozuna Deliberation Committee, Kakuryū submitted his resignation to the Japan Sumo Association on March 24, 2021. He retired with six Emperor's Cups and a makuuchi record of 645 wins and 394 losses. He retained his shikona (wrestler name) upon becoming a sumo elder, which he was entitled to as a former yokozuna to do for a period of five years pending his acquisition of a permanent share. Kakuryū spoke to reporters of feeling relieved and freed by his decision to retire.

Kakuryū's danpatsu-shiki (retirement ceremony) was held on 3 June 2023 at the Ryōgoku Kokugikan. Kakuryū performed his final yokozuna dohyō-iri, or ring entering ceremony, with former ōzeki Shōdai and newly-promoted ōzeki Kirishima serving as the tsuyuharai (dew sweeper) and tachimochi (sword bearer), respectively. Some 380 people took turns in cutting Kakuryū's ōichōmage, including all three of the other yokozuna from Mongolia: Asashōryū, Harumafuji and Hakuhō.

== After retirement ==
On 27 December 2023 the Sumo Association announced that Kakuryū would inherit the Otowayama elder stock, which had been vacated earlier in the year by former maegashira Tenkaihō. Additionally, he was given approval to branch off from Michinoku stable and form his own stable, Otowayama stable, with two wrestlers and the Sumo Association's most senior tokoyama going along. The stable is located in a three-story building in Sumida, Tokyo that was previously used by the local government before being renovated for use by sumo wrestlers.

In March 2024, it was announced that he would take on the role of ringside judge starting with the May tournament. The following month, his stable hosted both Michinoku stable's head coach and top-ranked wrestler (ōzeki Kirishima) following the stable's closure.

In March 2026 his stable saw Kirishima's second promotion to the rank of ōzeki. Kakuryū thus became the first stablemaster of Mongolian descent to participate in a promotion ceremony for a member of their stable.

== Fighting style ==
In 2006, at the beginning of his top division career, Kakuryū was one of the lightest men in the division at around 130 kg (290 lb). He made use of his agility by frequently employing henka (sidestepping) to outwit his opponents. He steadily put on weight, however, and at the time of his yokozuna promotion was around 154 kg (340 lb). He preferred yotsu-sumo, a style which involves grabbing the opponent's mawashi, or belt, and forcing or throwing him to the edge of the ring. His favoured grip was migi-yotsu, with his left hand placed outside and right hand inside his opponent's arms. His three most common winning techniques were yori-kiri, the force out, oshi-dashi, the push out, and hataki-komi, the slap down. He was also fond of shitatenage, the underarm throw.

== Personal life ==
In January 2015 Kakuryū announced his engagement to a fellow Mongolian, Dashnyam Munkhzaya. Their first child, a daughter, was born in May 2015, their second, a boy, in May 2017, and their third, a girl, in April 2020. Their wedding reception was held in October 2017, with fellow yokozuna Hakuhō among the guests.

In December 2020 after a two and a half year process, Kakuryū obtained Japanese citizenship, a requirement for staying in the Sumo Association as an elder after retirement, and took the name Mangarajarabu Ananda.

== Career record ==
Kakuryū Rikisaburō
Year	January Hatsu basho, Tokyo	March Haru basho, Osaka	May Natsu basho, Tokyo	July Nagoya basho, Nagoya	September Aki basho, Tokyo	November Kyūshū basho, Fukuoka
2001	x	x	x	x	x	(Maezumo)
2002	West Jonokuchi #32; 5–2	West Jonidan #97; 4–3	East Jonidan #74; 5–2	West Jonidan #32; 6–1	East Sandanme #70; 5–2	West Sandanme #40; 1–6
2003	West Sandanme #76; 2–5	East Jonidan #4; 4–3	East Sandanme #87; 3–4	East Jonidan #5; 5–2	West Sandanme #70; 3–4	West Sandanme #86; 6–1
2004	East Sandanme #25; 4–3	West Sandanme #13; 4–3	East Sandanme #3; 3–4	West Sandanme #17; 7–0–P; Champion	West Makushita #14; 1–6	West Makushita #35; 4–3
2005	West Makushita #27; 4–3	West Makushita #21; 5–2	West Makushita #12; 4–3	West Makushita #7; 4–3	East Makushita #5; 5–2	West Jūryō #14; 5–10
2006	East Makushita #3; 5–2	West Jūryō #11; 9–6	West Jūryō #8; 9–6	East Jūryō #4; 9–6	West Jūryō #1; 9–6	West Maegashira #8; 8–7
2007	East Maegashira #8; 6–9	West Maegashira #11; 9–6	West Maegashira #5; 6–9	East Maegashira #8; 9–6	West Maegashira #2; 7–8	East Maegashira #3; 4–11
2008	East Maegashira #8; 11–4; T	West Maegashira #1; 6–9	West Maegashira #3; 5–10	West Maegashira #7; 8–7	East Maegashira #5; 7–8	East Maegashira #6; 5–6–4
2009	West Maegashira #8; 9–6	West Maegashira #1; 10–5; T	East Komusubi #1; 9–6; T	East Sekiwake #1; 5–10	West Maegashira #3; 11–4; T	West Sekiwake #1; 7–8
2010	West Komusubi #1; 7–8	East Maegashira #1; 6–9	East Maegashira #3; 6–9	East Maegashira #6; 11–4; T	West Komusubi #1; 9–6	West Sekiwake #1; 7–8
2011	West Komusubi #1; 8–7	East Komusubi #1; Tournament Cancelled; Match fixing investigation 0–0–0	East Komusubi #1; 12–3; T	West Sekiwake #2; 10–5	East Sekiwake #2; 9–6	West Sekiwake #1; 10–5
2012	East Sekiwake #1; 10–5; O	East Sekiwake #1; 13–2–P; OT	West Ōzeki #3; 8–7	West Ōzeki #3; 9–6	West Ōzeki #3; 11–4	East Ōzeki #1; 9–6
2013	West Ōzeki #1; 8–7	East Ōzeki #2; 8–7	West Ōzeki #1; 10–5	East Ōzeki #2; 10–5	West Ōzeki #1; 9–6	East Ōzeki #2; 9–6
2014	West Ōzeki #1; 14–1–P	East Ōzeki #1; 14–1	East Yokozuna #2; 9–6	East Yokozuna #2; 11–4	West Yokozuna #1; 11–4	West Yokozuna #1; 12–3
2015	West Yokozuna #1; 10–5	East Yokozuna #2; 0–1–14	East Yokozuna #2; Sat out due to injury 0–0–15	East Yokozuna #2; 12–3	West Yokozuna #1; 12–3–P	East Yokozuna #1; 9–6
2016	East Yokozuna #2; 10–5	East Yokozuna #2; 10–5	West Yokozuna #1; 11–4	West Yokozuna #1; 2–2–11	East Yokozuna #2; 10–5	West Yokozuna #1; 14–1
2017	East Yokozuna #1; 5–6–4	West Yokozuna #1; 10–5	West Yokozuna #1; 1–4–10	West Yokozuna #2; 2–2–11	West Yokozuna #2; Sat out due to injury 0–0–15	West Yokozuna #2; Sat out due to injury 0–0–15
2018	East Yokozuna #2; 11–4	East Yokozuna #1; 13–2	East Yokozuna #1; 14–1	East Yokozuna #1; 3–3–9	East Yokozuna #1; 10–5	West Yokozuna #1; Sat out due to injury 0–0–15
2019	East Yokozuna #2; 2–4–9	West Yokozuna #1; 10–5	West Yokozuna #1; 11–4	East Yokozuna #1; 14–1	East Yokozuna #1; 4–4–7	East Yokozuna #1; 0–1–14
2020	West Yokozuna #1; 1–4–10	West Yokozuna-Ōzeki #1; 12–3	West Yokozuna #1; Tournament Cancelled; State of Emergency; 0–0–0	West Yokozuna #1; 0–2–13	West Yokozuna #1; Sat out due to injury 0–0–15	West Yokozuna #1; Sat out due to injury 0–0–15
2021	West Yokozuna #1; Sat out due to injury 0–0–15	West Yokozuna #1; Retired; 0–0–10	x	x	x	x
Record given as wins–losses–absences Top division champion Top division runner-up Retired Lower divisions Non-participation Sanshō key: F=Fighting spirit; O=Outstanding performance; T=Technique Also shown: ★=Kinboshi; P=Playoff(s); Divisions: Makuuchi — Jūryō — Makushita — Sandanme — Jonidan — Jonokuchi Makuuchi ranks: Yokozuna — Ōzeki — Sekiwake — Komusubi — Maegashira

== See also ==
- Glossary of sumo terms
- List of sumo elders
- List of past sumo wrestlers
- List of Mongolian sumo wrestlers
- List of non-Japanese sumo wrestlers
- List of sumo record holders
- List of sumo top division champions
- List of sumo top division runners-up
- List of yokozuna

Preceded by Harumafuji Kōhei	71st Yokozuna; 2014–2021	Succeeded by Kisenosato Yutaka
Yokozuna is not a successive rank, and more than one wrestler can hold the title at once
