= Kayō Yasutoki =

Japanese sumo wrestler

Personal information
- Native name: 嘉陽 快宗
- Born: Kayō Yasumune; July 14, 1999 (age 27) Ichikawa, Chiba, Japan
- Height: 1.71 m (5 ft 7 in)
- Weight: 174 kg (384 lb; 27.4 st)

Sport
- Sport: Sumo
- Rank: see below
- Heya: Nishonoseki → Nakamura
- Debut: May 2022
- Highest rank: Maegashira 16 (May 2025)
- Updated on May 18, 2025

Kayō Yasutoki (Japanese: 嘉陽 快宗; born 14 July 1999 as Kayō Yasumune) is a professional sumo wrestler from Naha City, Okinawa Prefecture. Although he is currently affiliated with the Nakamura stable, at the time of his debut he was affiliated with the Nishonoseki stable.

== Early life and amateur career ==
Yasamune was born in Ichikawa City, Chiba Prefecture. He attended Ichikawa Municipal Arai Elementary School and started training at Ichikawa City Sumo School since he was in the fourth grade. At the age of 12, he studied sumo at Itoigawa Municipal Nou Junior High School in Niigata Prefecture and then at Niigata Prefectural Marine High School. After graduating from high school, he went on to study Martial Arts Education at the Faculty of Sports Culture at Nippon Sport Science University. In 2021, in his fourth year of university, he reached the top eight in both the All Japan Sumo Championships and the National Student Sumo Championships, which earned him the right to enter the lowest rank of the third division in sumo wrestling.

== Career ==
After graduating from university, he joined the Nishonoseki stable from where he made his debut in the May 2022 tournament. He said he was prepared for the great responsibility, saying, "If Kisenosato-san asks me to join, I can't refuse." In his debut tournament, he was ranked at the bottom of the third division at 90th with 6 wins and 1 loss. In the following July and September tournaments, he recorded 5 wins and 2 losses, he was promoted to the makushita division in the November tournament. In that tournament, he had a good record of 6 wins and 1 loss. Although his hometown mentioned in the May 2022 tournament was Ichikawa, Chiba; from the July 2022 tournament onward his hometown was changed to Naha, Okinawa, where his parents were born.

In the January 2023 tournament, he had his first losing record since debuting. In the November tournament, he had a good record of 6 wins and 1 loss in the west makushita division as the sixth-ranked wrestler.

In the March 2024 tournament, he finished with a record of 4 wins and 3 losses as the third ranked wrestler in the west makushita division, but again was unlucky in the rankings and did not advance to the juryo division after the tournament. In the May tournament, he was given the top position in the west makushita division, and finished with 5 wins and 1 loss in the 6th bout on the 11th day. At the ranking composition meeting after the tournament, it was decided that he would be promoted to the juryo division the following July. At the Japan Sumo Association's board of directors meeting held on May 30, it was decided that he would be transferred to the newly established Nakamura stable on 1 June 2024. In the July tournament, he was ranked 13th in the west juryo division, with a record of 7 wins and 8 losses, almost ensuring his stay in the juryo division. In the September tournament, he showed his strength in oshi-sumo, winning five in a row from the first day, and ultimately finished with a record of 11 wins and 4 losses, second only to the juryo winner, Takerufuji, with a record of 13 wins and 2 losses. In the November tournament, he rose by 10 and a half ranks at once, reaching his highest rank of 3rd in the west juryo division. After a loss on the first day of the tournament, he started off well, winning four in a row, but then lost five in a row from the sixth day, leading to a losing record, and then suffering his seventh loss on the 13th day, leaving him with no other options, but winning consecutively on the remaining two days and finishing with a winning record on the final day.

He again reached his highest rank as the top west juryo wrestler in the January 2025 tournament, but lost to Hakuyozan on the final day of the tournament with a record of 7 wins and 7 losses. In the following March tournament, he was ranked second in the east juryo division, and after winning his ninth match against Hakuyozan on the 14th day, it was reported that he was likely to be promoted to the makuuchi division in the following May tournament.

Shortly after the March tournament ended, it was announced that Kayo was to be promoted to the Makuuchi division for the May 2025 tournament. In the May 2025 tournament, he was ranked at the position of east Maegashira 16. In his makuuchi debut, Kayo started with a 4-bout losing streak but followed up with a string of 4 wins to even out his record on day 8. However, after a streak of wins and losses, he lost to Kinbōzan on day fifteen and resulted in a losing record of 7 wins and 8 losses. The May performance led to him remaining in the top division in July 2025 as east Maegashira 16.

== Fighting style ==
Kayō specializes in oshi-sumo (pushing and thrusting). His most-used winning techniques are oshidashi (push out) and hatakikomi (slap down).

== Career record ==
Kayō Yasutoki
Year	January Hatsu basho, Tokyo	March Haru basho, Osaka	May Natsu basho, Tokyo	July Nagoya basho, Nagoya	September Aki basho, Tokyo	November Kyūshū basho, Fukuoka
2022	x	x	Sandanme tsukedashi #90; 6–1	East Sandanme #30; 5–2	West Sandanme #7; 5–2	West Makushita #45; 6–1
2023	West Makushita #18; 3–4	West Makushita #27; 5–2	East Makushita #19; 2–5	West Makushita #37; 5–2	West Makushita #23; 6–1	West Makushita #6; 6–1
2024	East Makushita #1; 3–4	West Makushita #3; 4–3	West Makushita #1; 5–2	West Jūryō #13; 7–8	East Jūryō #14; 11–4	West Jūryō #3; 8–7
2025	West Jūryō #1; 7–8	East Jūryō #2; 9–6	East Maegashira #16; 7–8	East Maegashira #16; 4–11	East Jūryō #6; 6–9	East Jūryō #8; 6–9
2026	West Jūryō #9; 9–6	West Jūryō #6; 7–8	West Jūryō #9; 5–10	West Jūryō #12; 7–8	West Jūryō #12; 11–4–PP	West Jūryō #4; 5–10
Record given as wins–losses–absences Top division champion Top division runner-up Retired Non-participation Jūryō Lower divisions Sanshō key: F=Fighting spirit; O=Outstanding performance; T=Technique Also shown: ★=Kinboshi; P=Playoff(s); Divisions: Makuuchi — Jūryō — Makushita — Sandanme — Jonidan — Jonokuchi Makuuchi ranks: Yokozuna — Ōzeki — Sekiwake — Komusubi — Maegashira

== See also ==
- Glossary of sumo terms
- List of active sumo wrestlers
