= Tomokaze Sōdai =

Japanese professional sumo wrestler

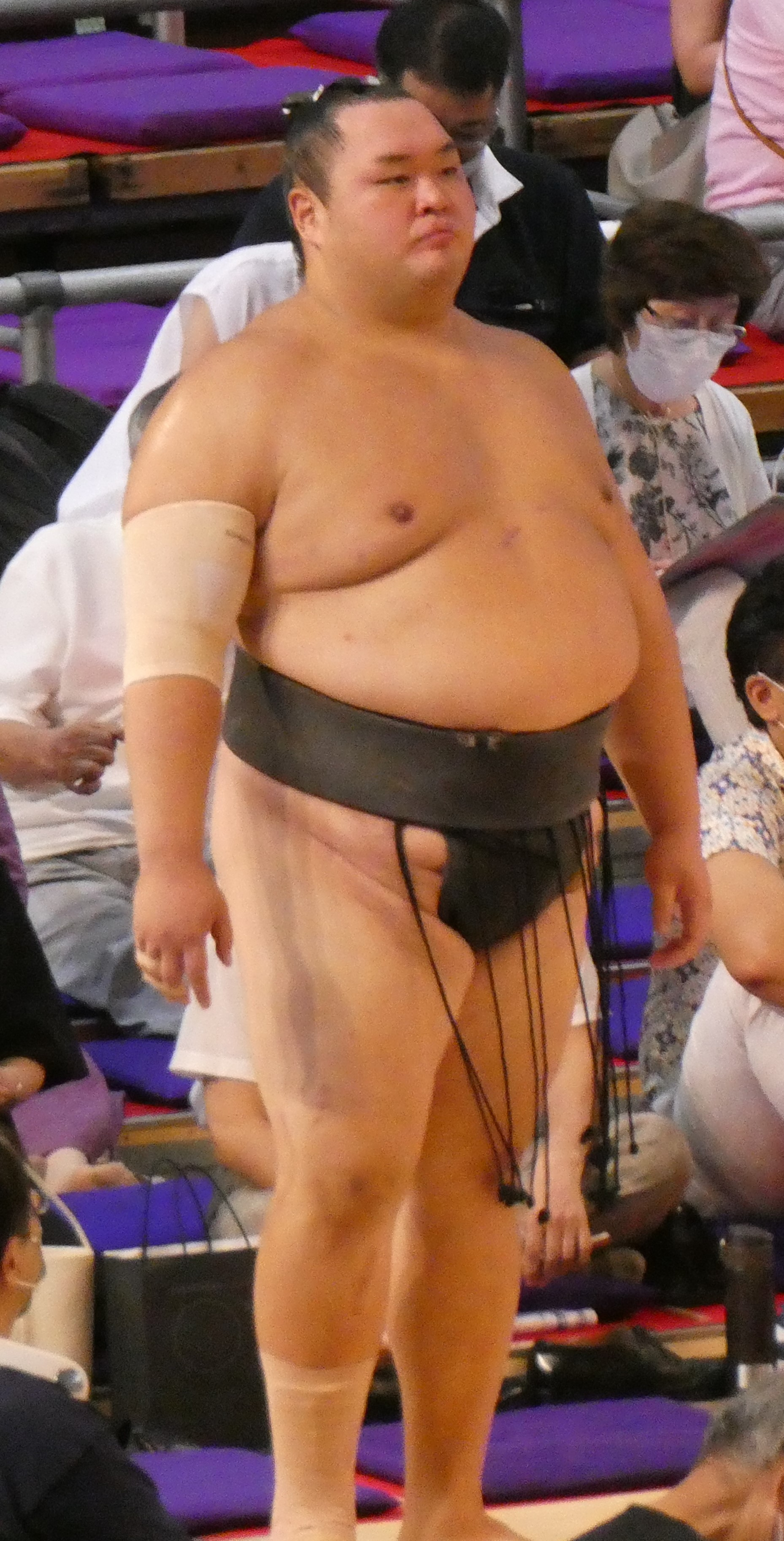

Personal information
- Native name: 友風 想大
- Born: Yūta Minami; December 2, 1994 (age 31) Kawasaki, Kanagawa Prefecture, Japan
- Height: 1.85 m (6 ft 1 in)
- Weight: 183 kg (403 lb; 28.8 st)

Sport
- Sport: Sumo
- Rank: see below
- University team: Nippon Sport Science University
- Heya: Oguruma → Nishonoseki → Nakamura
- Debut: May 2017
- Highest rank: Maegashira 3 (September, 2019)
- Championships: 1 (Jūryō); 1 (Sandanme); 1 (Jonokuchi)
- Special Prizes: 1 Outstanding Performance
- Gold Stars: 2 (Kakuryū)
- Updated on 1 July 2024

Tomokaze Sōdai (Japanese: 友風 想大; born December 2, 1994, as Yūta Minami (南 友太, Minami Yuta)) is a Japanese professional sumo wrestler from Kawasaki, Kanagawa. He debuted in sumo wrestling in May 2017 and made his makuuchi debut in March 2019. His highest rank has been maegashira 3. Originally a member of Oguruma stable, he moved to Nishonoseki stable in 2022. In June 2024, he moved to the newly-established Nakamura stable. He has one special prize and two kinboshi for defeating a yokozuna.

After suffering a joint dislocation in his right knee in 2019, he was forced to withdraw from all competitions and did not return until March 2021. Following his injury, Tomokaze admitted in an interview given to the Tokyo Shimbun that he was certified as Level 5 disabled and issued a disability certificate in February 2021.

== Early life and background ==
Yūta grew up in a single-mother household. He is an accomplished pianist, his mother being a pianist herself and having taught him the instrument, and Yūta wanting to join a music college when he was younger. As a child, his favorite wrestler was Kisenosato, whose deashi style inspired him enormously. Yūta also participated in many sports at an early age competing in karate and basketball when attending elementary school before taking up judo at junior high school, where his coach was a former sumo wrestler. Although his school did not have a sumo club, Yūta competed, although he had little interest in the sport, and went to win the team championship in the Kanto junior high school tournament. When he was about to enter high school, he was invited to join a judo specialized school but decided to join Mukonooka Technical High School, a prefectural high school renowned for its sumo club, on the advice of his judo coach. During high school sumo competitions, he reached the final of a National High School Tournament; in which he was defeated by the Mongolian Altankhuyag Ichinnorov. After graduating high school, he was advised to join a music college but instead chose to attend Nippon Sport Science University, and continued to compete with some success in national sumo competitions.

== Early career ==
In the spring of 2017, Yūta decided to turn professional sumo and joined the Oguruma stable, led by the former ōzeki Kotokaze, on his master's sixtieth birthday. He shared the same rookie inspection session with Yago Takanori, his stablemate, who was the 2016 amateur-yokozuna. Since then, the two have been in a friendly rivalry. He adopted the shikona, or ring name, Tomokaze, combining the kanji for "friend" with the kanji for "wind" (風), the latter being often adopted by many Oguruma wrestlers including Yoshikaze and Takekaze. There, he first served as Yoshikaze's tsukebito (assistant), a wrestler who is also an alumnus of Nippon Sport Science University, and whom he admires, saying in particular that he wants to emulate him and learn from him.

He made his debut in the Nagoya tournament, where he claimed the jonokuchi division championship (yūshō). He was moved up to the jonidan division in September and secured a second promotion as he posted a 6-1 record. In November he made his first appearance as a sandanme ranked wrestler and took his second yūshō as he won all seven of his matches and then defeating Tsuyukusa in a play-off. Tomokaze began 2018 in the makushita division and worked his way steadily up the ranks, although he found it very difficult to compete in the upper echelons of this division. With four consecutive winning records (kachi-koshi), he was promoted to Makushita 4 for the September tournament, a rank that puts him in a position for potential promotion to sekitori status. He won five of his seven matches, securing his promotion to the jūryō division with a win over Gagamaru in his final match. Promoted along Toyonoshima, this promotion also meant that Tomokaze had been promoted to sekitori in eight tournaments, the same number as his mentor Yoshikaze, something he was pleased about. At the time of his promotion to jūryō, he unusually asked to be maintained as Yoshikaze's tsukebito, because his stable lacked young apprentices who could serve as assistants and that he would benefit from continuing to learn from him.

On his jūryō debut, Tomokaze initially won his first match against Gagamaru thanks to a mono-ii called by the shimpan. He then went to defeat Shimanoumi but lost the next three matches. During his second defeat by Mitoryū, he dislocated his right little finger and had to be taken to the infirmary immediately after his bout. He however managed to score nine consecutive wins to enter the final day one win ahead of former sekiwake Kotoyūki. He defeated his more experienced opponent by oshidashi to take the yūshō but his low rank of jūryō 14 meant that he was not eligible for direct promotion to the makuuchi division. In January, Tomokaze was ranked at jūryō 4, giving him a realistic prospect of promotion with a strong kachi-koshi but his chances appeared slim when he ended the eighth day with a 3–5 record. In the second week however, he went unbeaten in seven bouts to end the basho on 10–5 secure his elevation to the top makuuchi division along Terutsuyoshi and Daishōhō. Tomokaze's promotion makes him the seventh wrestler from Oguruma stable to reach that level in the rankings since the establishment of the stable and the seventh from his university to be promoted in makuuchi since Hokutofuji in 2016. His progress from his jonokuchi debut to makuuchi in eleven basho was the joint-fourth fastest in modern sumo.

== Makuuchi ==
=== Makuuchi promotion ===
On his top division debut, Tomokaze was ranked at maegashira 13 and recorded nine wins. He was listed as a potential recipient of the special prize for Fighting Spirit but the latter was conditional on a tenth victory. Tomokaze lost on the final day of the tournament to Aoiyama and did not receive the award. At maegashira 9 in May, he made his twelfth consecutive kachi-koshi and secured a move up to maegashira 7 for the July basho in Nagoya. In July 2019, Tomokaze was in contention for the yūshō after winning nine of his first eleven matches but lost to his old high school rival Ichinojō on Day 12. On Day 13, he faced yokozuna Kakuryū, the first time he was paired against a grand-champion, and, in a major upset, he handed his only defeat of the tournament to Kakuryū and won his first kinboshi by Hatakikomi. The victory tied Tomokaze with Konishiki for the fastest to win their first kinboshi since their professional debut, doing so in 14 tournaments; the joint record would stand until Aonishiki accomplished the same feat in his 12th tournament in 2025. After the bout, Tomokaze commented: "I'm happy, but it still doesn't feel real." He moved to eleven wins by beating Kotoekō but lost tamely to Terutsuyoshi on the final day to end with an 11–4 record. His achievements saw him awarded the shukun-shō, or special prize for Outstanding Performance. On receiving the award, he said "It's still like a dream, but I'm really happy to win this award. I put out some good sumo, but some bouts weren't that good... I'm grateful for the opportunity to challenge the upper-ranked fighters but I have a long way to go. I'll do my best to grow and catch up with them".

In September, he defeated Kakuryū for the second straight tournament on Day 7 and afterwards dedicated the win to his stablemate and friend Yoshikaze, who had just announced his retirement. He however picked up his first make-koshi or losing-record in his entire career on Day 14 of that same tournament, losing to Maegashira 2 Asanoyama.

=== Injury and comeback ===
Tomokaze had to forfeit (kyūjō) the tournament, after sustaining a serious injury to his right knee in his fight against Kotoyūki, on the second day of the November 2019 tournament in Kyūshū. The medical certificate submitted by his stable to the Japan Sumo Association stated: "Dislocated right knee joint with ligament damage. The treatment period is currently undecided." His stablemaster stated to the press he could be out for up to a year. He was transported to a hospital in Fukuoka City by ambulance immediately after the bout, the injury being so serious that it almost resulted in amputation. However, he was encouraged by his master, who, having suffered a similar injury in the November 1978 tournament, nevertheless reached the rank of ōzeki in November 1981.

Following his injury, he underwent surgery with a total of four different operations in five months to reconstruct his ligaments. He then underwent rehabilitation, dividing his time between his hometown of Kawasaki, Kanagawa and his stable. Since then, he cannot move his right leg from the ankle down due to the severed nerve. He sat out the next six tournaments (not including the cancelled May 2020 tournament) and made his comeback in the March 2021 tournament, where he scored a 6–1 record in jonidan. Two more winning records in May and July saw him progress to near the top of the sandanme division by September 2021, and he had reached upper makushita by January 2022. On the pressure of his injury, Tomokaze insists that he is recovering well and that his training with Yago is gradual.

Because Oguruma-oyakata would reach the mandatory age of retirement, the closure of Oguruma stable was decided in January 2022, the personnel of the stable being mainly transferred to Oshiogawa stable. Tomokaze, however, was transferred to Nishonoseki stable in February 2022, along his coach and friend Yoshikaze. March 2022 saw his first losing record since his return from injury. In the following tournament, however, he scored a solid 6–1 and once again found himself in a position of potential promotion to the jūryō division.

=== Return to sekitori ===
After four tournaments, in which Tomokaze stagnated at the top of the makushita division, it was finally announced that he would regain his sekitori status for the March 2023 tournament, after going 4-3 as Makushita 2. This promotion made him the only sekitori in Nishonoseki stable at the time and the first one raised by former yokozuna Kisenosato.

During the July 2023 tournament, Tomokaze was in position to win the jūryō championship being neck and neck with Atamifuji. On Day 14, Daiamami also forced his way into the leading group, the three wrestlers now at 10 wins to 3 defeats. However, Tomokaze was beaten on the fifteenth and final day by Kitanowaka, eliminating him from the title race, while Atamifuji won for the eleventh time and took the playoff against Daiamami. At the next tournament, in September, Tomokaze succeeded in achieving a positive kachi-koshi score as jūryō 3, reinforcing the likelihood of makuuchi repromotion for the first time in four years.

After a good score as jūryō 3, it was announced that Tomokaze would make his return to the makuuchi division for the November 2023 tournament. This made Tomokaze the third wrestler in the sport's history to return to sumo's top division after dropping back down to the jonidan division, following Terunofuji in 2020 and Ura in 2021. Following poor results, however, he was demoted for the March tournament to the jūryō division before regaining his makuuchi status for the May tournament. However, his results were not up to the standard of this level of competition, and Tomokaze went on to lose six consecutive matches from the first day.

Following the May 2024 tournament, it was announced that Tomokaze would move to the newly-established Nakamura stable, owned by former sekiwake Yoshikaze, effective on 1 June. When the rankings for the July 2024 tournament were published, it was announced that Tomokaze had changed his first name from Yūta (勇太) to Sōdai (想大). After notching the first sekitori win for his new stable on the third day of that tournament, Tomokaze explained that his stablemaster Nakamura suggested the name change. He said that upon his return to the ring after injury, Nakamura told him that he was different from others and continued to do magnificent things, and that he was able to return to the ring because of the "feelings" (sōdai) of others. Tomokaze subsequently dropped to jūryō division in March 2024, making a comeback to the top division in May before falling again in July.

After spending seven consecutive tournaments in jūryō, Tomokaze returned to the makuuchi ranks in September 2025. On Day 13, he secured a winning record in the top division for the first time in six years.

== Fighting style ==
Tomokaze focuses heavily on pushing, thrusting, and pulling rather than grasping his opponent's belt. His most common winning moves by far are hatakikomi (slap down), accounting for 43% of his recorded wins, and oshidashi (push out), accounting for 32% of his wins.

== Personal life ==
In February 2026, Tomokaze announced that he got married in January 2023 after several years of dating. He has one son, born in March 2024.

Tomokaze has a passion for the piano. His favorite performer is Richard Clayderman. He has two younger sisters.

== Career record ==
Tomokaze Sōdai
Year	January Hatsu basho, Tokyo	March Haru basho, Osaka	May Natsu basho, Tokyo	July Nagoya basho, Nagoya	September Aki basho, Tokyo	November Kyūshū basho, Fukuoka
2017	x	x	(Maezumō)	East Jonokuchi #25; 7–0; Champion	East Jonidan #15; 6–1	East Sandanme #53; 7–0–P; Champion
2018	East Makushita #31; 5–2	East Makushita #18; 4–3	East Makushita #13; 4–3	East Makushita #10; 5–2	West Makushita #4; 5–2	West Jūryō #14; 12–3; Champion
2019	East Jūryō #4; 10–5	East Maegashira #13; 9–6	West Maegashira #9; 8–7	West Maegashira #7; 11–4; O★	West Maegashira #3; 7–8 ★	West Maegashira #3; 0–3–12
2020	East Jūryō #1; Sat out due to injury 0–0–15	West Jūryō #13; Sat out due to injury 0–0–15	West Makushita #11; Tournament Cancelled; State of Emergency; 0–0–0	West Makushita #11; Sat out due to injury 0–0–7	East Makushita #52; Sat out due to injury 0–0–7	West Sandanme #35; Sat out due to injury 0–0–7
2021	West Sandanme #95; Sat out due to injury 0–0–7	West Jonidan #55; 6–1	East Sandanme #88; 5–2	West Sandanme #55; 6–1	East Sandanme #3; 5–2	East Makushita #37; 6–1
2022	East Makushita #15; 5–2	East Makushita #8; 3–4	West Makushita #10; 6–1	East Makushita #3; 4–3	East Makushita #2; 2–5	West Makushita #8; 5–2
2023	East Makushita #2; 4–3	West Jūryō #13; 8–7	East Jūryō #12; 8–7	East Jūryō #9; 10–5	East Jūryō #3; 11–4	East Maegashira #14; 7–8
2024	East Maegashira #15; 5–10	West Jūryō #3; 9–6	East Maegashira #16; 2–13	East Jūryō #7; 5–7–3	East Jūryō #11; 9–6	West Jūryō #5; 7–8
2025	West Jūryō #6; 7–8	East Jūryō #7; 7–8	East Jūryō #7; 10–5	West Jūryō #2; 9–6	East Maegashira #16; 9–6	West Maegashira #12; 7–8
2026	West Maegashira #13; 4–11	West Jūryō #2; 6–9	East Jūryō #5; 8–7	West Jūryō #4; 5–10	West Jūryō #7; 5–10	East Jūryō #11; 6–9
Record given as wins–losses–absences Top division champion Top division runner-up Retired Non-participation Jūryō Lower divisions Sanshō key: F=Fighting spirit; O=Outstanding performance; T=Technique Also shown: ★=Kinboshi; P=Playoff(s); Divisions: Makuuchi — Jūryō — Makushita — Sandanme — Jonidan — Jonokuchi Makuuchi ranks: Yokozuna — Ōzeki — Sekiwake — Komusubi — Maegashira

== See also ==
- Glossary of sumo terms
- List of active sumo wrestlers
- List of active gold star earners
- List of active special prize winners
- List of sumo record holders
- List of sumo second division champions
