= Nakamura stable (active) =

Professional sumo stable opened in June 2024

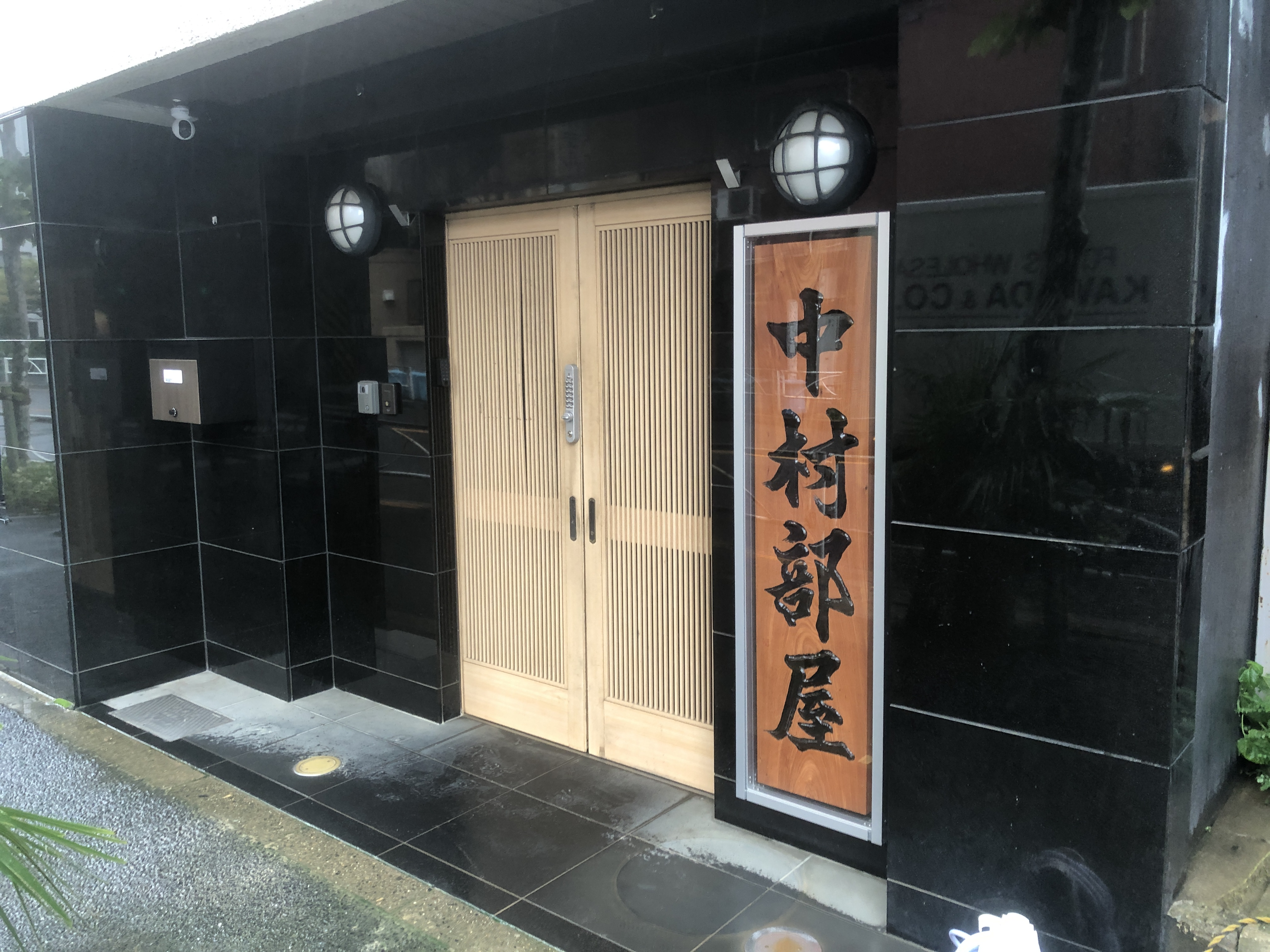

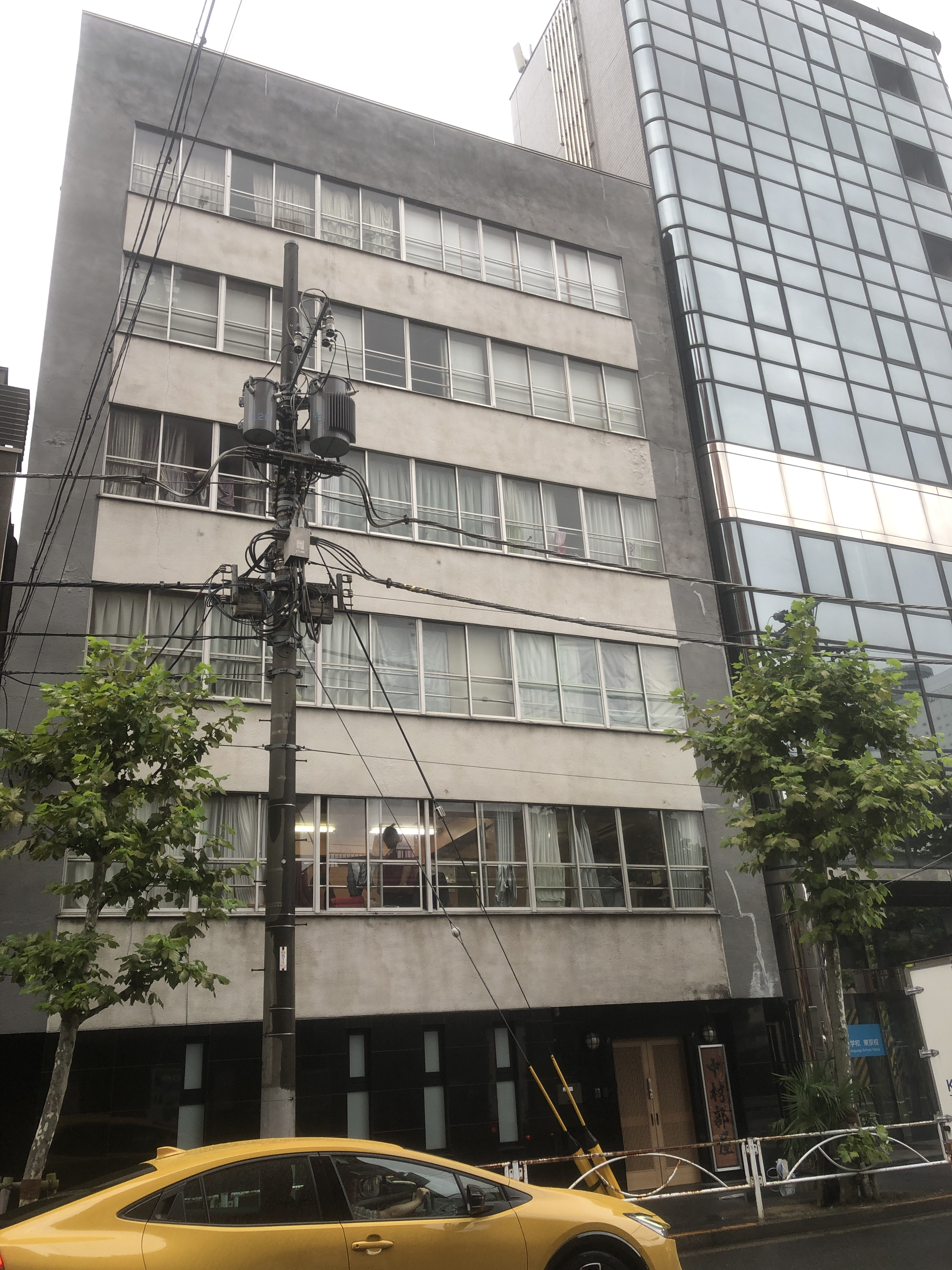

Nakamura stable (中村部屋, Nakamura-beya) is a stable of sumo wrestlers, one of the Nishonoseki group of stables. It broke off from Nishonoseki stable by its founder, former sekiwake Yoshikaze, and opened in June 2024.

As of May 2026, the stable has 10 active wrestlers.

== History ==
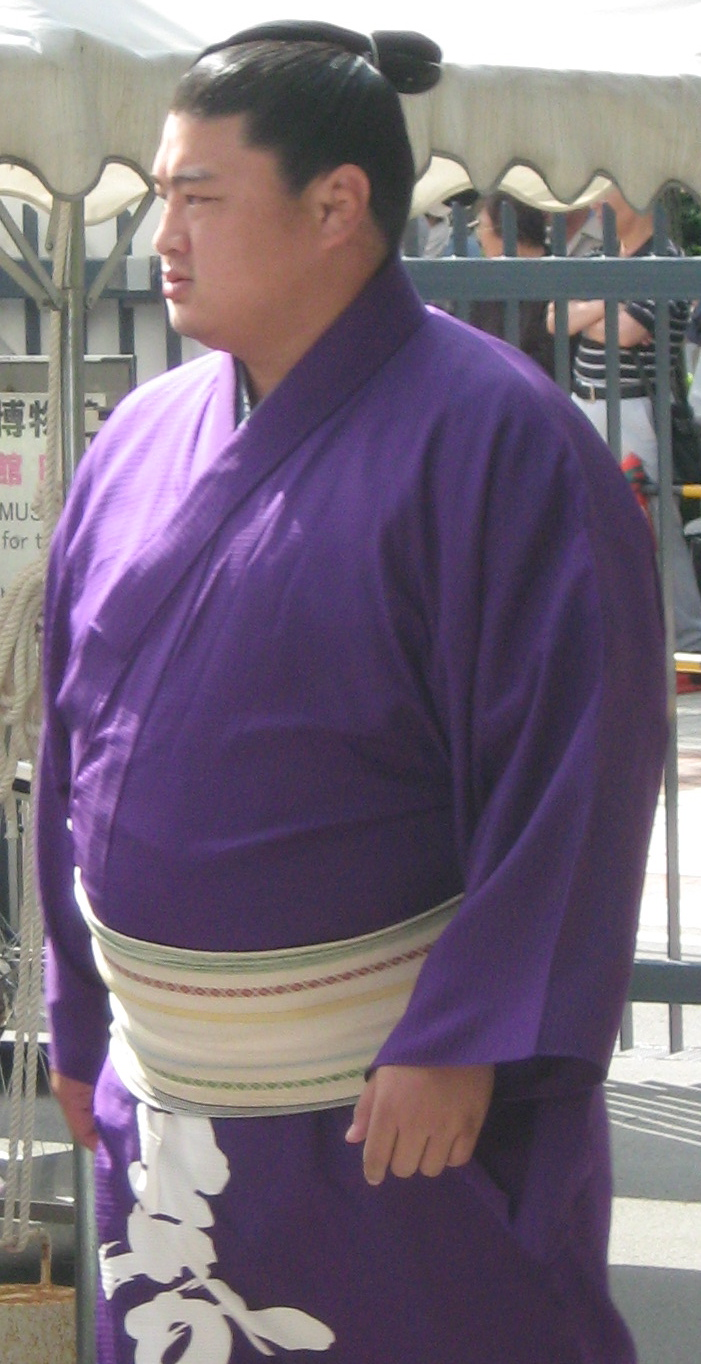
Former sekiwake Yoshikaze opened Nakamura stable in June 2024

The stable is owned by the former Yoshikaze, who competed in professional sumo as a member of Oguruma stable for over 15 years from 2004 until 2019. Upon his retirement, he took the elder name Nakamura and coached at Oguruma until 2022. When Oguruma closed due to its stablemaster reaching mandatory retirement age, Nakamura and some of the wrestlers and staff transferred to Nishonoseki stable.

Following the May 2024 grand sumo tournament, the Japan Sumo Association approved the request of Nakamura to split from Nishonoseki to create his own stable. The new Nakamura stable opened the following month with 8 wrestlers on the former site of Michinoku stable, which had closed earlier in the year. It marked the stable's revival after the previous Nakamura stable, led by the former Fujizakura, closed in 2013. Some of the wrestlers transferring to Nakamura upon its opening included Tomokaze, who had followed the former Yoshikaze from Oguruma stable to Nishonoseki, and recent jūryō promotion Kayō. At the July 2024 tournament, Tomokaze won his Day 3 jūryō contest to mark the stable's first victory for a salaried wrestler. A formal ceremony to mark the opening of the stable was held on 1 September 2024.

Soon after its opening in June 2024, Sports Hochi reported that Nakamura stable decided to break tradition with typical sumo training schedules and methods. While most sumo stables start the day with training and then serve lunch and dinner, wrestlers at Nakamura stable start the day with breakfast and typically eat three meals a day, while training days are split into two sessions. Furthermore, a typical week at the stable sees a maximum of three days of sumo training and two days of strength training, the latter of which is conducted in a training room with equipment built on the upper floor of the stable. The stablemaster also installed an oxygen capsule said to help with fatigue, considered rare for a sumo stable. The stable's accommodations and training practices were featured on the official English-language YouTube channel of the Japan Sumo Association, SUMO Prime Time, in August 2024.

In May 2025 Kayō was promoted to makuuchi, making him Nakamura stable's first wrestler to be elevated to the top division.

== Owners ==
- 2024–present: Nakamura Masatsugu (iin, former sekiwake Yoshikaze, born 1982)

== Notable active wrestlers ==
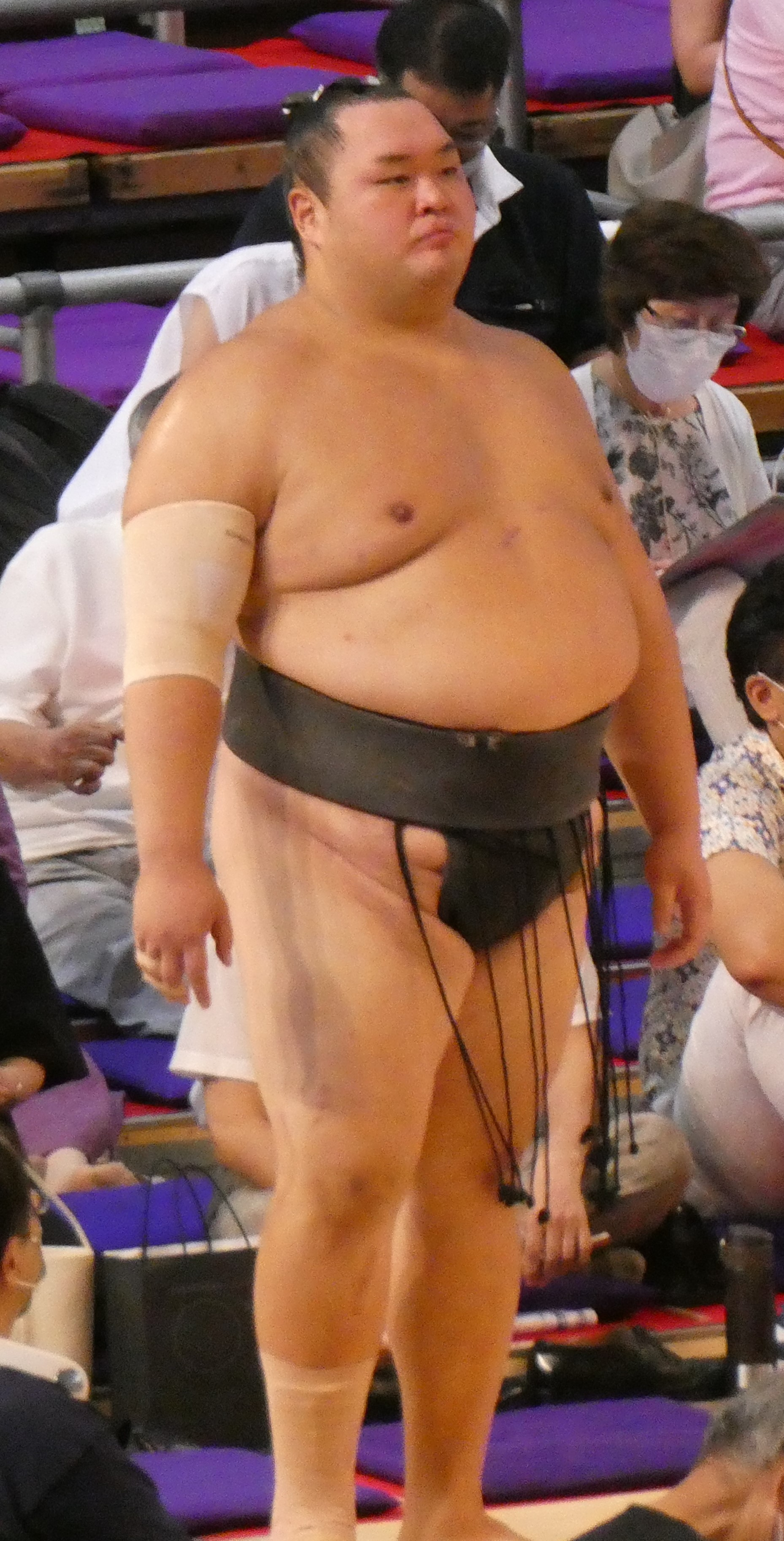
Tomokaze was one of the first wrestlers to join Nakamura stable

- Tomokaze (best rank maegashira, born 1994)
- Kayō (best rank maegashira, born 1999)
- Miyanokaze (best rank jūryō, born 1999)

== Usher ==
- Rokurō (jūryō yobidashi, real name Kenzō Araki, born 1974)

== Hairdressers ==
- Tokokawa (fifth class tokoyama, born 2008)

== Location and access ==
1-18-7 Ryōgoku, Sumida, Tokyo (formerly used by Michinoku stable)

== See also ==
- List of sumo stables
- List of active sumo wrestlers
- List of past sumo wrestlers
- Glossary of sumo terms
