= Nishonoseki stable (active) =

Japanese sumo wrestling organization

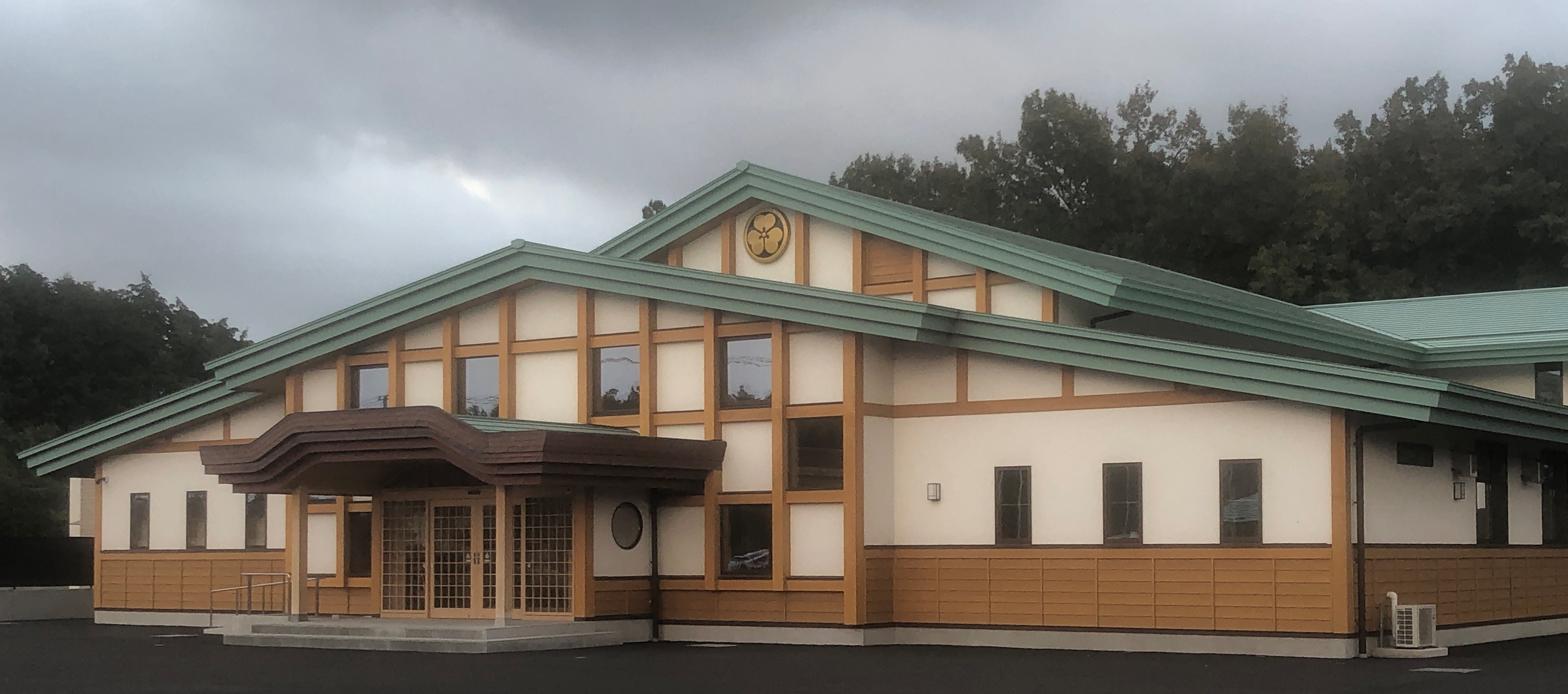
The stable in 2023

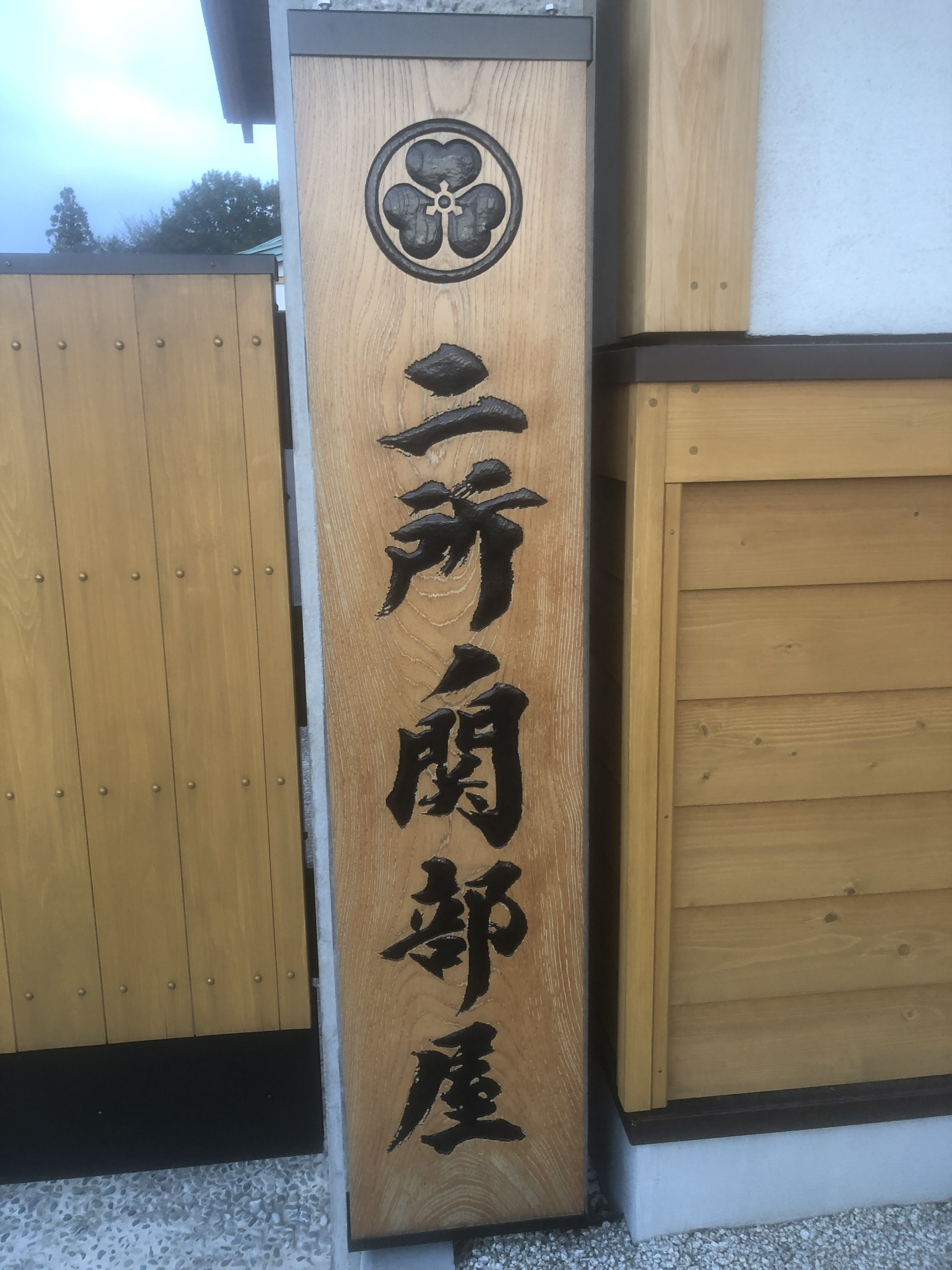
Stable sign

Nishonoseki stable (二所ノ関部屋, Nishonoseki-beya) is a stable of sumo wrestlers, one of the Nishonoseki group of stables. It broke off from Tagonoura stable by its founder, the 72nd yokozuna Kisenosato, and officially opened in August 2021 as Araiso stable (荒磯部屋, Araiso-beya). The name of the stable changed in January 2022 after the Japan Sumo Association approved the changing of Kisenosato's toshiyori (elder name) from Araiso to Nishonoseki, following the retirement of former ōzeki Wakashimazu basically reforming the stable in a new location.

As of May 2026, the stable has 23 active wrestlers.

== History ==
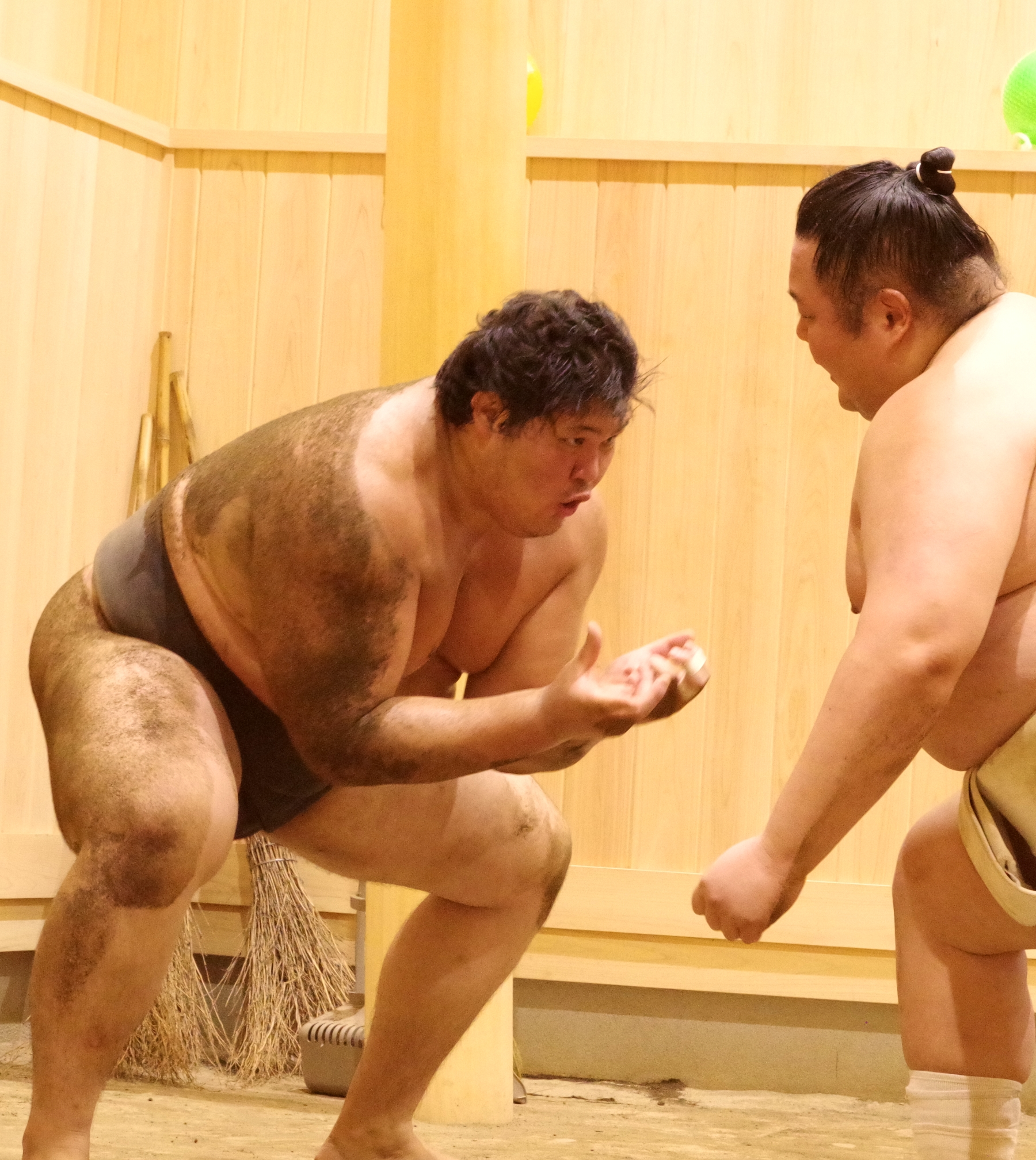
Ōnosato

During the January 2019 tournament 72nd yokozuna Kisenosato, who had retired from sumo wrestling and assumed the name Araiso, left Tagonoura stable, where he had been working as a stable elder, establishing his own stable with four other wrestlers and one referee that he took with him. At first the stable was called "Araiso stable," but in December 2021, Araiso exchanged retirement names with Nishonoseki (the former ozeki Wakashimazu), and the stable was renamed "Nishonoseki stable."

That same month, the newly renamed Nishonoseki recruited an 18-year-old student from his hometown Ibaraki Prefecture's Ushiku Senior High School, whom he had spotted while frequenting the school's sumo club. In March 2022 the stable recruited a pair of identical twins, Hayashiryū and Rinko, from the same Nagano sumo club as former ōzeki Mitakeumi. In March 2023 the stable also announced the recruitment of 22-year-old amateur yokozuna Daiki Nakamura, a graduate of Nippon Sport Science University. Defined as "the most eagerly awaited prospect to come out of collegiate sumo in decades," Nakamura–who took the shikona "Ōnosato"–began his professional career at the rank of makushita 10 via the makushita tsukedashi system.

Nakamura (sekiwake Yoshikaze) moved to the stable after the January 2022 tournament, due to the closure of his own Oguruma stable, and brought former maegashira Tomokaze with him. Tomokaze was promoted back to jūryō following the January 2023 tournament, becoming the stable's first sekitori.

Ōnosato was promoted to jūryō in July 2023 along with another lower-division wrestler, Takahashi. They are the first two recruited by Kisenosato to become sekitori. In May 2024, one year after his debut, Ōnosato won his first championship in the top division. Following in the footsteps of his stablemaster, Ōnosato was promoted to the rank of yokozuna in May 2025. He was promoted to the top rank after a record 13 tournaments, and became the first wrestler in history to post winning records in all of their tournaments leading to yokozuna promotion.

Shortly after the May 2024 tournament the former Yoshikaze branched off from Nishonoseki to form his own stable, Nakamura stable.

In late June 2026, the team signed a cooperation agreement with the city of Ōarai, Ibaraki, to further promote traditional culture.

== Ring name conventions ==
Some promising wrestlers at this stable (such as Ōnosato or Wakenosato) take ring names or shikona that contain the kanji の里 (read "nosato"), in honor of the stable's founder, yokozuna Kisenosato and his master, yokozuna Takanosato.

== Stable Masters ==
- 2021–present: Nishonoseki Yutaka (iin, the 72nd yokozuna Kisenosato, born 1986)

== Notable active wrestlers ==
- Ōnosato (the 75th yokozuna, born 2000)
- Shirokuma (best rank maegashira, born 1999)

== Notable former members ==
- Nakamura Masatsugu (iin, sekiwake Yoshikaze, born 1982)
- Tomokaze (best rank maegashira 3, born 1994)
- Kayō (best rank maegashira 16, born 1999)

== Referees ==
- Kimura Ennosuke (makushita gyōji, real name Satoru Ishimaru, born 1991)

== Location and access ==
139-1 Arakawahongō, Ami, Inashiki, Ibaraki Prefecture
10-minute walk from Hitachino-Ushiku Station (Jōban Line)

The present Nishonoseki stable building was opened in June 2022. Prior to that, the stable members trained on an interim basis at the University of Tsukuba.

== See also ==
- List of sumo stables
- List of active sumo wrestlers
- List of past sumo wrestlers
- Glossary of sumo terms
