= Kinboshi =

Notation used in professional sumo wrestling

Kinboshi (金星, lit. 'gold star') is a notation used in professional sumo wrestling to record a maegashira wrestler's victory over a yokozuna in a regulation bout during a honbasho, one of the six grand sumo tournaments held each year.

It is believed that the term stems from the usage of the terms shiroboshi (白星, lit. 'white star') to designate a bout victory, and kuroboshi (黒星, lit. 'black star') to designate a bout defeat. Thus a "gold star" designates a special victory.

The word kinboshi first came into popular use in the Taishō era (1912–1926), and the system of monetarily awarding a maegashira who defeated a yokozuna in an official tournament began in January 1930.

A kinboshi victory increases the balance in the maegashira's mochikyūkin account by 10 yen. This balance is converted using a multiplier, presently 4,000, and added to the wrestler's bonus in every subsequent tournament in which he competes as a sekitori. With six tournaments a year, this one victory corresponds to a pay increase of 240,000 yen per annum for the remainder of the wrestler's sekitori career.

The record for most kinboshi earned is held by former sekiwake Akinoshima who won 16 bouts against six different yokozuna when ranked as a maegashira.

== Restrictions ==
Kinboshi are not awarded to san'yaku ranked wrestlers who defeat a yokozuna, nor is it awarded if the maegashira beats a yokozuna with a default win (or fusenshō). It is also not given if the yokozuna is disqualified for using an illegal move (or hansoku). Neither does a playoff win count as a gold star victory.

== Other uses ==
Ginboshi (銀星, lit. 'silver star') is also used informally to denote a maegashira victory over an ōzeki. However, there is no monetary bonus for such a win, nor are official ginboshi records kept. The unofficial record holder for silver star victories is Aminishiki at 47, followed by Toyonoshima at 35 and Fujinishiki at 33.

== List of kinboshi records ==
Tables for both kinboshi earned (by maegashira) and those conceded (by yokozuna) are given below.

The tables are up to date as of the end of the November 2026 tournament.

=== List of top kinboshi earners ===
==== Kinboshi earned by active wrestlers ====
This is a running list of the number of all kinboshi earned by all currently active wrestlers. Dates for a wrestler's professional debut, as well as their first and latest gold star earned are given.

Kinboshi	Wrestler	Debut	First	Latest
8	Tamawashi	2004-1	2015-5	2025-7
7	Takayasu	2005-3	2013-3	2026-9
6	Daieishō	2012-1	2019-9	2026-3
6	Hakunofuji	2023-1	2025-7	2026-11
5	Abi	2013-5	2018-5	2025-7
4	Fujinokawa	2023-1	2026-3	2026-7
3	Ura	2015-3	2017-7	2026-11
3	Ōhō	2018-1	2024-3	2025-7
3	Takanoshō	2010-3	2022-5	2024-7
3	Tobizaru	2015-1	2022-9	2025-1
3	Wakamotoharu	2011-11	2024-1	2025-11
3	Yoshinofuji	2024-5	2025-11	2026-1
2	Atamifuji	2020-11	2026-1	2026-1
2	Meisei	2011-5	2023-5	2024-3
2	Mitakeumi	2015-3	2017-1	2017-1
2	Nishikigi	2006-3	2019-1	2023-7
2	Shōdai	2014-3	2017-7	2024-1
2	Tomokaze	2017-5	2019-7	2019-9
1	Aonishiki	2023-9	2025-7	2025-7
1	Asanoyama	2016-3	2019-9	2019-9
1	Chiyoshōma	2009-7	2025-3	2025-3
1	Fujiryōga	2025-3	2026-11	2026-11
1	Fujiseiun	2021-3	2026-11	2026-11
1	Gōnoyama	2021-3	2026-7	2026-7
1	Ichiyamamoto	2017-1	2025-3	2025-3
1	Kotoshōhō	2017-11	2025-7	2025-7
1	Sadanoumi	2003-3	2015-5	2015-5
1	Wakatakakage	2017-3	2026-3	2026-3

==== All time most kinboshi earned ====
This is a list of the most kinboshi earned by historic maegashira recorded since 1930. Dates for a wrestler's professional debut, as well as their first and latest gold star earned are given.

Kinboshi	Wrestler	Debut	First	Latest
16	Akinoshima	1982-3	1988-9	1999-7
12	Takamiyama	1964-3	1968-3	1978-9
12	Tochinonada	1996-1	1998-1	2008-7
11	Tosanoumi	1994-3	1995-11	2003-11
10	Dewanishiki	1940-5	1949-10	1963-3
10	Haguroyama	1950-1	1955-5	1961-5
10	Kitanonada	1940-1	1954-3	1961-5
10	Ōzutsu	1971-5	1979-9	1986-3
10	Tsurugamine	1947-6	1955-9	1961-7
9	Fujizakura	1963-3	1973-9	1981-1
9	Hasegawa	1960-3	1965-9	1974-3
9	Ichinojō	2014-1	2014-9	2022-7
9	Mitsuneyama	1937-5	1944-5	1957-9
9	Takatōriki	1983-3	1990-11	1998-7
9	Tamanoumi	1937-5	1953-5	1958-9

=== Kinboshi conceded ===
==== Current lowest kinboshi ratio ====
This is a running list of lowest kinboshi ratios for the two currently active yokozuna.

	Name	promoted to yokozuna	kinboshi conceded	bouts as yokozuna	kinboshi ratio
1	Ōnosato	2025-5	14	107	13.08%
2	Hōshōryū	2025-1	21	117	17.95%

- The most recent yokozuna to retire, Terunofuji, ended his career on a kinboshi ratio of 14.86% with 22 gold stars conceded in 148 bouts at yokozuna rank. A ratio of about 20% is considered average.

==== All time lowest kinboshi ratio ====
This is a list of the five lowest kinboshi ratios by historic yokozuna recorded since 1930.

	Name	promoted to yokozuna	kinboshi conceded	bouts as yokozuna	kinboshi ratio
1	Tamanoumi	1970-1	3	150	2.00%
2	Hakuhō	2007-5	26	1002	2.59%
3	Tamanishiki	1932-11	4	121	3.30%
4	Taihō	1961-9	28	716	3.91%
5	Chiyonofuji	1981-7	29	730	3.97%

- Tsunenohana's yokozuna career ended the same year after official kinboshi records came into effect in January 1930; therefore his record has not been included.

=== List of fastest kinboshi earners ===
The following lists show the wrestlers who earned a kinboshi against a yokozuna the fastest since the introduction of the six-tournament-per-year system in 1958. Before this system was introduced, the record for the fastest kinboshi in the history of the sport was held by former sekiwake Toyoshima, who defeated Futabayama on the fifth day of the January 1942 tournament, just 10 tournaments after his professional debut.

Fastest kinboshi achieved since maezumo debut
	Name	Debut	First achieved	Tournament	Rank	Yokozuna defeated
1	Aonishiki	2023-9	2025-7	12th – Day 3	M1	Hōshōryū
2	Konishiki	1982-7	1984-9	14th – Day 11	M6	Takanosato
3	Tomokaze	2017-5	2019-7	14th – Day 13	M7	Kakuryū
4	Hokutofuji	2015-3	2017-7	15th – Day 3	M2	Kakuryū
5	Ōsunaarashi	2012-3	2014-7	15th – Day 5	M3	Kakuryū
6	Ura	2015-3	2017-7	15th – Day 9	M4	Harumafuji
7	Asashōryū	1999-1	2001-9	17th – Day 6	M1	Musashimaru
8	Akebono	1988-3	1991-1	18th – Day 2	M1	Asahifuji
9	Takakeishō	2014-9	2017-9	19th – Day 10	M1	Harumafuji
10	Takanohana	1988-3	1991-5	20th – Day 1	M1	Chiyonofuji

Fastest kinboshi achieved after a tsukedashi debut
	Name	Debut	First achieved	Tournament	Rank	Yokozuna defeated
1	Ichinojō	2014-1	2014-9	5th – Day 13	M10	Kakuryū
2	Musōyama	1993-1	1994-1	7th – Day 4	M3	Akebono
3	Endō	2013-3	2014-5	8th – Day 4	M4	Kakuryū
4	Yutakayama	1961-3	1962-7	9th – Day 7	M1	Kashiwado
5	Dejima	1996-3	1997-9	10th – Day 3	M1	Takanohana
6	Yoshinofuji	2024-5	2025-11	10th – Day 10	M5	Ōnosato
7	Fujiryōga	2025-3	2026-11	11th – Day 3	M1	Hōshōryū
8	Tosanoumi	1994-3	1995-11	11th – Day 7	M1	Takanohana
9	Kotomitsuki	1999-3	2000-11	11th – Day 11	M9	Musashimaru
10	Mitakeumi	2015-3	2017-1	12th – Day 2	M1	Harumafuji

== See also ==
- List of active special prize winners
- List of sumo record holders
- List of sumo top division champions
- List of sumo top division runners-up
- List of yokozuna
- List of active sumo wrestlers
- List of past sumo wrestlers
- Glossary of sumo terms
