= Yutakayama Ryōta =

Japanese sumo wrestler

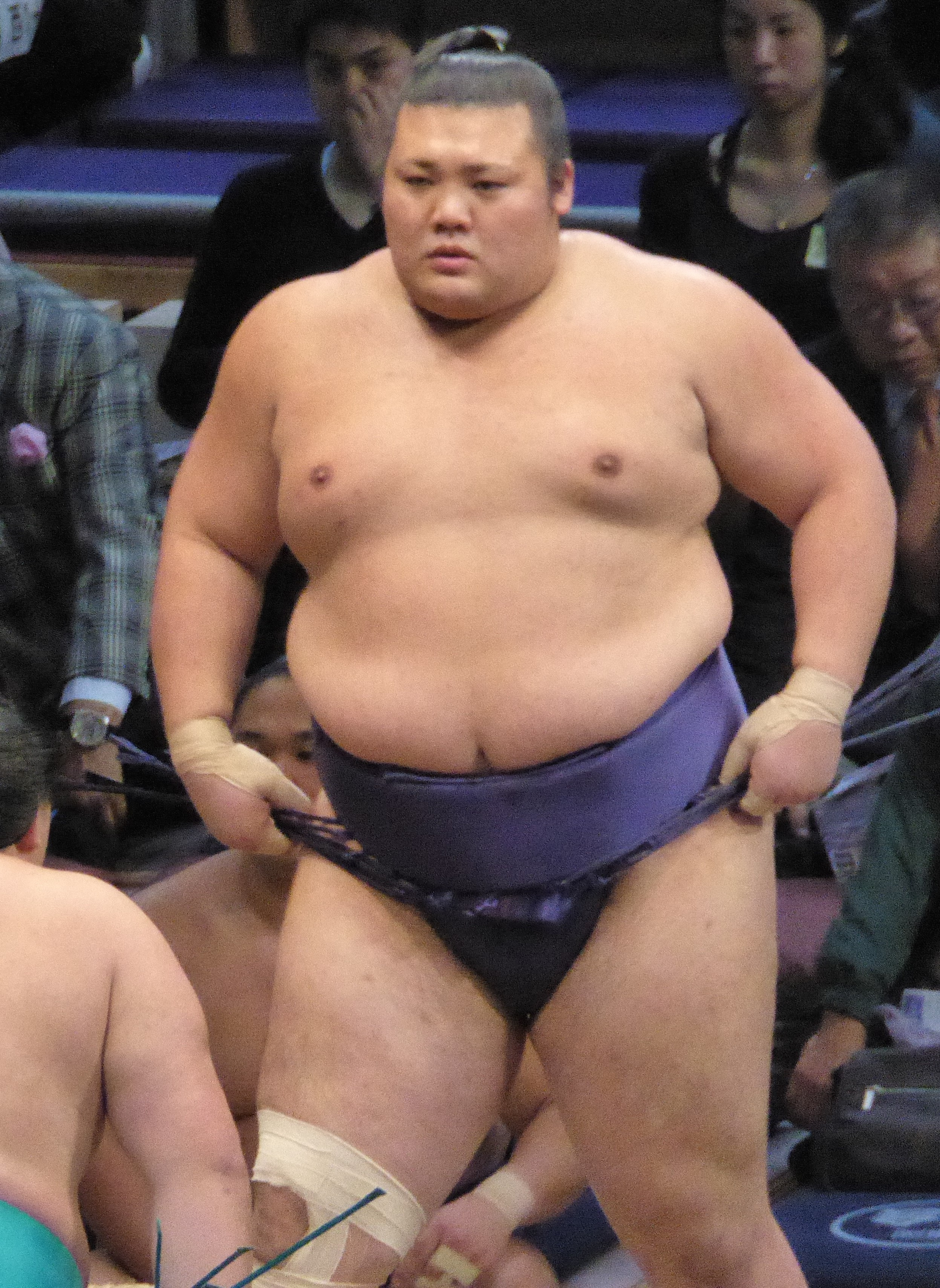

Personal information
- Native name: 豊山 亮太
- Born: Oyanagi Ryōta; 22 September 1993 (age 33) Kita-ku, Niigata
- Height: 1.84 m (6 ft 0 in)
- Weight: 174 kg (384 lb; 27.4 st)

Sport
- Sport: Sumo
- University team: Tokyo University of Agriculture
- Retired: November 2022
- Heya: Tokitsukaze
- Record: 277-281-10
- Debut: March 2016
- Highest rank: Maegashira 1 (July 2020)
- Championships: 1 (Makushita); 1 (Sandanme)
- Special Prizes: 1 (Fighting Spirit)
- Updated on 28 November 2022

Yutakayama Ryōta (Japanese: 豊山 亮太; born 22 September 1993 as Ryōta Oyanagi (小柳 亮太, Oyanagi Ryōta)) is a former Japanese professional sumo wrestler from Kita-ku, Niigata. He made his professional debut at sandanme tsukedashi, which allowed him to skip the lower divisions, in March 2016, and his first makuuchi division honbasho was the Natsu tournament in May 2017. His highest rank was maegashira 1.

== Early life and sumo background ==
Oyanagi started doing sumo his first year of elementary school. He abandoned sumo in junior high school in favor of baseball and continued until entering high school. He started to feel he was reaching his limit in baseball and in high school because of his size he went back to participating in sumo. After a fairly successful high school career he chose to continue doing sumo at Tokyo University of Agriculture where he majored in forestry in the Faculty of Regional Environmental Science. Each spring in Osaka the members of the Tokyo University of Agriculture sumo club would have joint training with the members of Tokitsukaze stable. This is where he was introduced to Tokitsukaze-oyakata who was also a Tokyo University of Agriculture graduate. He was later told by him that he should join professional sumo, which he accepted.

== Career ==
=== Early career ===
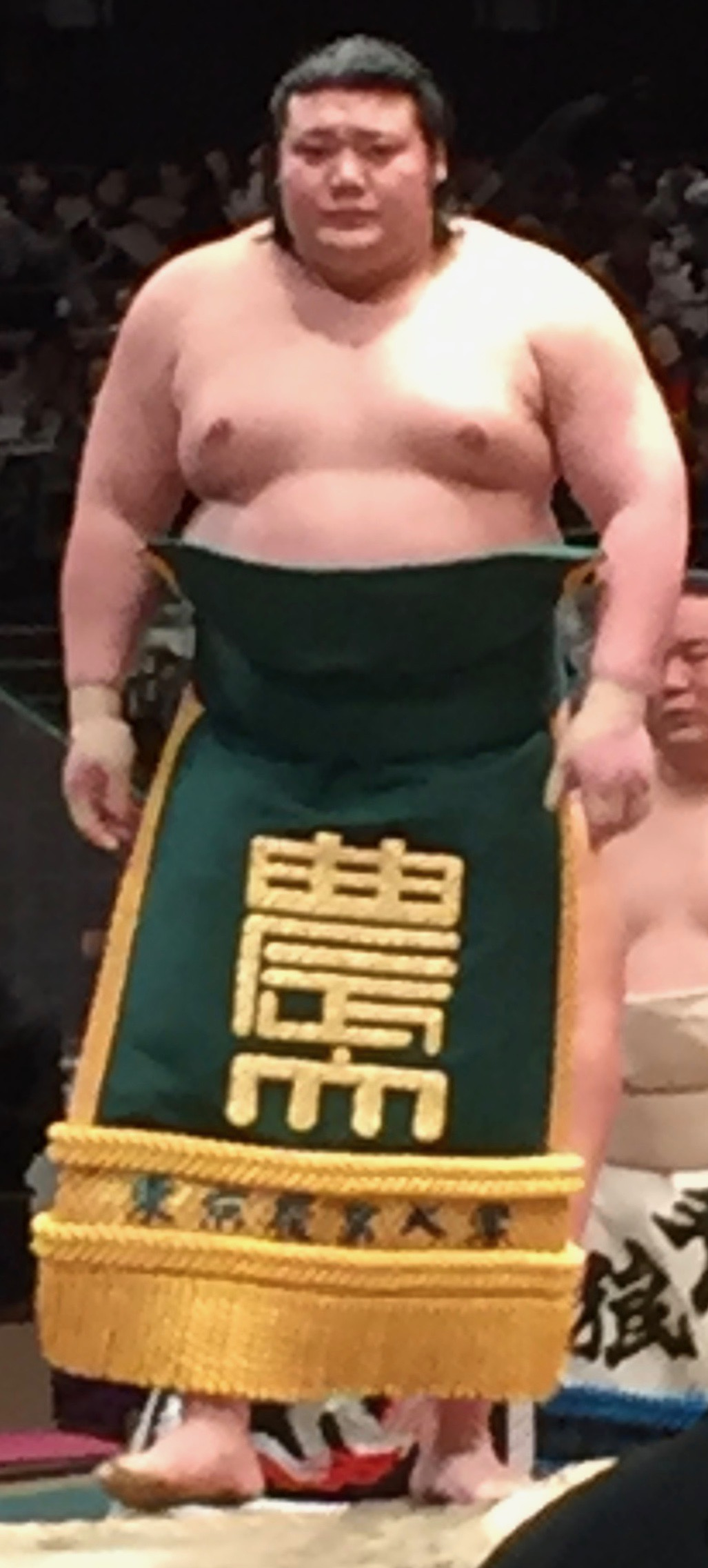
Yutakayama in 2017

Oyanagi won no major titles in his amateur career, being somewhat prone to lapses in concentration and overconfidence against some of his key rivals. However, having finished in the top eight at the All-Japan Sumo Championship he was granted sandanme tsukedashi which allowed him to skip the lower divisions and start at sandanme 100. He won his debut basho with a 7–0 championship, he matched this performance the following tournament to win the makushita division. After two more winning tournaments he made his sekitori debut by being promoted to jūryō in November 2016.

=== Top division career ===
Following three successful tournaments in jūryō he was promoted to the top makuuchi division in May 2017. To mark the occasion he changed his shikona or fighting name from his own surname of Oyanagi to Yutakayama, a prestigious name at Tokitsukaze stable that had previously been used by the former ōzeki and head of the Japan Sumo Association Yutakayama Katsuo and former komusubi Yutakayama Hiromitsu. He could only manage four wins at the rank and was demoted back down to the second division for the next tournament. He managed a runner-up performance and was promoted back up the following tournament only to match his record for May 2017. After coming back to the makuuchi division for the third time he was finally able to get a winning record of 9–6 at maegashira 14 and followed that performance with a 10–5 at maegashira 11, which saw him promoted to the upper maegashira ranks for the first time, at maegashira 3. Fighting all the top ranked wrestlers for the first time he could manage only a 2–13 record, but in the following July tournament he produced his best performance to date, with a 12–3 runner up performance including a final day victory over the tournament winner Mitakeumi. He was awarded his first special prize, for Fighting Spirit. Promoted to maegashira 2 in September 2018, he withdrew from the tournament on Day 5 after sustaining an elbow injury in his Day 3 defeat to Kisenosato. He returned to the tournament on Day 9 and won three bouts out of his remaining seven matches for a 3–10–2 record. Three more losing records saw him demoted from makuuchi after the March 2019 tournament. He returned to the top division in September 2019 and four straight winning records saw him climb to maegashira 1 for the July 2020 tournament, his highest rank to date. However, he then had five straight losing records and was demoted back to jūryō for the May 2021 tournament.

== Retirement ==
After the July 2021 tournament, Yutakayama reentered the top makuuchi division for the September 2021 tournament. However he quickly dropped in the rankings after a barely achieved winning score in September. For 2022, Yutakayama only achieved a winning record on the July tournament. In September, his 4-11 score sent him back to the jūryō division. After finishing the November tournament with a losing record, he announced his retirement from professional sumo.

Yutakayama's danpatsu-shiki (retirement ceremony) was held at the Ryōgoku Kokugikan in Tokyo on 25 June 2023, shortly before his former stablemates at Tokitsukaze stable departed for the sumo tournament in Nagoya. Approximately 430 individuals participated in the ceremonial cutting of Yutakayama's topknot.

=== Post-retirement athletic activities ===
Oyanagi did not remain with the Sumo Association upon his retirement, and became a personal trainer in Tokyo. His gym, Personal Gym OYG, officially opened its doors in Akihabara, Tokyo at the end of June.

On October 16, 2023, Oyanagi competed in the Legacy Tokyo half marathon after physical preparation in which he lost 60 kg (130 lb), now weighing 110 kg (240 lb). He finished the race with a time of 2 hours 8 minutes and 25 seconds. Inspired by Yuki Kawauchi, he also announced his goal of reaching a weight of 90 kg (200 lb) and competing in the Tokyo Marathon in March 2024.

== Fighting style ==
Yutakayama is an oshi-sumo wrestler, who prefers thrusting and pushing at his opponents to fighting on the mawashi or belt. His most common winning kimarite is oshi-dashi, or push out.

== Career record ==
Yutakayama Ryota
Year	January Hatsu basho, Tokyo	March Haru basho, Osaka	May Natsu basho, Tokyo	July Nagoya basho, Nagoya	September Aki basho, Tokyo	November Kyūshū basho, Fukuoka
2016	x	Sandanme tsukedashi #100; 7–0–P; Champion	West Makushita #58; 7–0–P; Champion	West Makushita #7; 6–1	East Makushita #1; 4–3	West Jūryō #12; 11–4
2017	East Jūryō #6; 8–7	West Jūryō #4; 9–6	East Maegashira #16; 4–11	East Jūryō #5; 11–4–P	West Maegashira #15; 4–11	West Jūryō #3; 9–6
2018	West Maegashira #14; 9–6	West Maegashira #11; 10–5	West Maegashira #3; 2–13	West Maegashira #9; 12–3; F	East Maegashira #2; 3–10–2	West Maegashira #10; 5–10
2019	East Maegashira #14; 6–9	West Maegashira #16; 3–12	East Jūryō #5; 8–7	West Jūryō #3; 9–6	East Maegashira #16; 10–5	West Maegashira #9; 8–7
2020	West Maegashira #9; 11–4	East Maegashira #3; 8–7	West Maegashira #1; Tournament Cancelled; State of Emergency; 0–0–0	West Maegashira #1; 5–10	East Maegashira #4; 2–6–7	East Maegashira #12; 6–9
2021	East Maegashira #15; 7–8	East Maegashira #15; 4–10–1	East Jūryō #4; 8–7	East Jūryō #1; 10–5	West Maegashira #14; 8–7	East Maegashira #13; 7–8
2022	West Maegashira #13; 6–9	West Maegashira #14; 7–8	West Maegashira #14; 6–9	East Maegashira #16; 8–7	West Maegashira #14; 4–11	West Jūryō #4; Retired; 5–10
Record given as wins–losses–absences Top division champion Top division runner-up Retired Lower divisions Non-participation Sanshō key: F=Fighting spirit; O=Outstanding performance; T=Technique Also shown: ★=Kinboshi; P=Playoff(s); Divisions: Makuuchi — Jūryō — Makushita — Sandanme — Jonidan — Jonokuchi Makuuchi ranks: Yokozuna — Ōzeki — Sekiwake — Komusubi — Maegashira

== Filmography ==
- 11 Rebels (2024), Tsujigiri

== See also ==
- Glossary of sumo terms
- List of past sumo wrestlers
- List of sumo tournament top division runners-up
- Active special prize winners
