= Daiamami Genki =

Japanese sumo wrestler

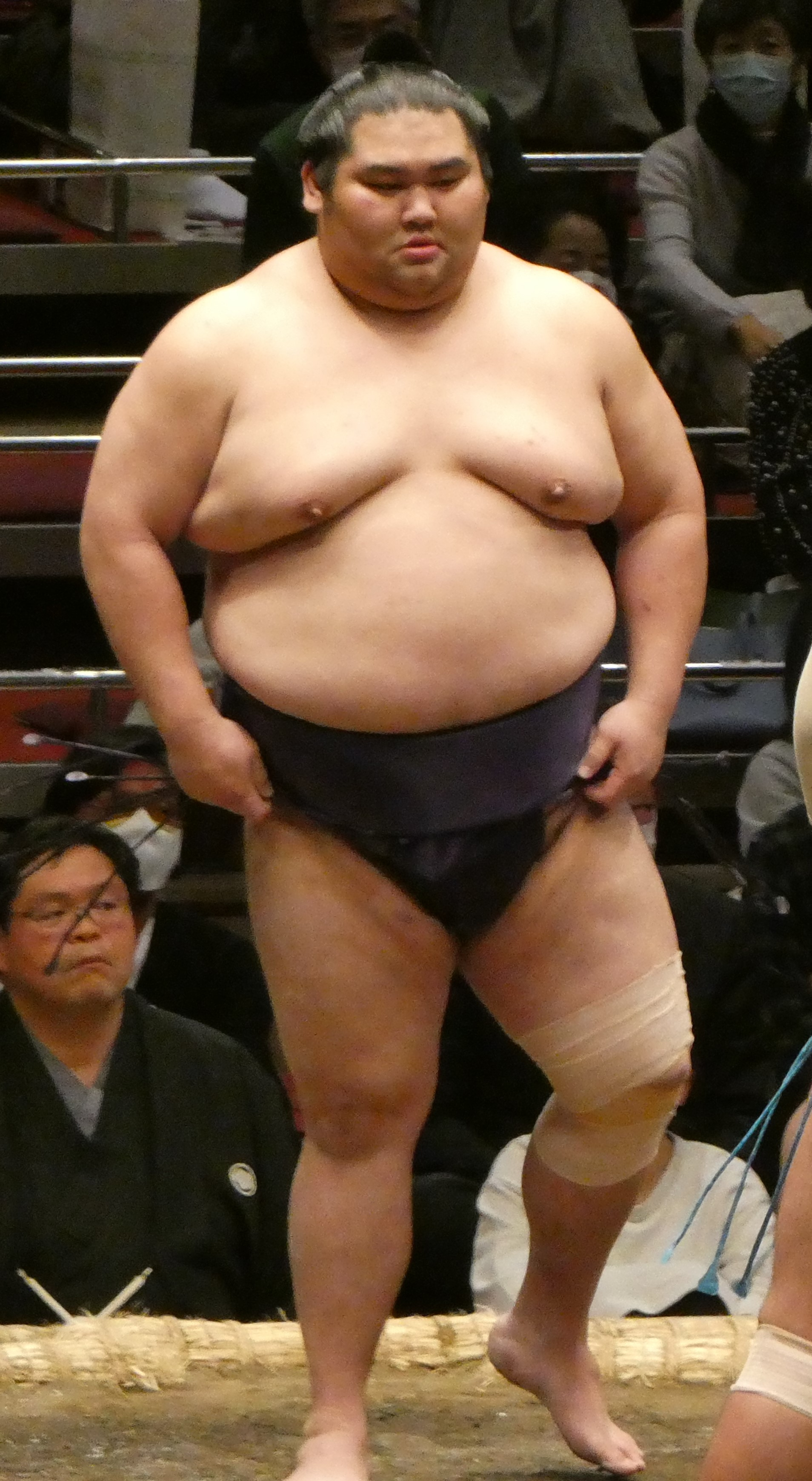

Personal information
- Native name: 大奄美 元規
- Born: Sakamoto Genki; December 15, 1992 (age 33) Tatsugō, Kagoshima, Japan
- Height: 184.5 cm (6 ft 1/2 in)
- Weight: 183.8 kg (405 lb; 28.94 st)

Sport
- Sport: Sumo
- University team: Nihon University
- Retired: January 2026
- Heya: Oitekaze
- Record: 392-418-7
- Debut: January 2016
- Highest rank: Maegashira 11 (May 2018)
- Championships: 1 (Jūryō)
- Updated on January 16, 2026

Daiamami Genki (Japanese: 大奄美 元規; born December 15, 1992 as Genki Sakamoto (坂元 元規)) is a Japanese former professional sumo wrestler from Tatsugō, Kagoshima.

After a successful amateur career, Daiamami entered the professional league in January 2016, making the top makuuchi division in November of the following year. His highest rank was maegashira 11. He wrestled for Oitekaze stable.

== Early life and sumo background ==
Daiamami started sumo in his second year of elementary school and in high school he would go on to win the Kanazawa high school sumo tournament. This helped him join the prestigious Nihon University sumo program where he would later be a Captain.

He injured his Medial meniscus in his third year and had to undergo corrective surgery to fix it. After graduating he worked for Nihon University as a business association player and staff member. After winning the 2015 Japan Corporate Sumo Tournament, one of the four tournaments that grants tsukedashi, he decided to join Oitekaze stable under fellow Nihon University graduate Daishōyama.

== Career ==
Daiamami made his debut in January, 2016. Because of his amateur success he was granted a makushita tsukedashi allowing him to skip the lower divisions of sumo. He quickly rose up the ranks recording only one make-koshi or losing record on the way to the makuuchi division. He won the jūryō division yūshō or championship in July 2017 and followed up with another kachi-koshi or winning record in September. He made his makuuchi debut in November 2017 at the rank of maegashira 14. After a 6–9 record he produced kachi-koshi or winning records in his second and third top division tournaments, and was promoted to his highest rank to date of maegashira 11 in May. However he scored only 4–11 in this tournament and was demoted back to jūryō. He returned to makuuchi after the September 2018 tournament where he scored 11–4, losing a playoff for the championship to Tokushōryū. He was unable to get winning records in the November 2018 and January 2019 tournaments and was demoted to jūryō again. He returned to makuuchi in March 2020 following an 11-4 record in the previous tournament, but could only score 5–10 and was again demoted. He returned to the top division a year later in March 2021, and managed to remain in makuuchi for three straight tournaments, but fell back to jūryō in September 2021. During the year 2022, Daiamami rose twice to a position to win the jūryō championship with a score of 11–4. However, he failed both times, the first time against Nishikifuji in May and the second time against Ōshōma in November. In 2023, Daiamami again found himself in a potential championship-winning situation at the July tournament, where he was, however, defeated on the final day in a playoff against Atamifuji.

Daiamami appeared once more in the top division in March 2024. During the January 2026 tournament, the Sumo Association announced Daiamami's retirement from professional competition. He will not remain with the Sumo Association as a coach. At a press conference a few days later, Daiamami told reporters that he decided to retire due to knee pain, which made it difficult for him to maintain his stance. He expressed his feelings on his sumo career as "painful" in both mind and body, and that he felt "relieved" after retiring. His retirement ceremony was held at the Fukuoka city hall on 31 October 2026 with around 200 people taking part in the cutting of the topknot.

== Personal life ==
Daiamami enjoys cooking, and has expressed his desire to possibly open a restaurant sometime after his retirement.

== Fighting style ==
Daiamami was a yotsu-sumo wrestler who preferred grappling techniques to pushing or thrusting. His favoured grip on his opponent's mawashi was migi-yotsu, a left hand outside, right hand inside position. His most common winning technique was a straightforward yorikiri (frontal force out), which was responsible for a majority of his victories.

== Career record ==
Daiamami Genki
Year	January Hatsu basho, Tokyo	March Haru basho, Osaka	May Natsu basho, Tokyo	July Nagoya basho, Nagoya	September Aki basho, Tokyo	November Kyūshū basho, Fukuoka
2016	Makushita tsukedashi #15; 4–3	West Makushita #11; 4–3	East Makushita #9; 4–3	East Makushita #6; 4–3	West Makushita #3; 4–3	West Makushita #1; 4–3
2017	West Jūryō #13; 10–5	East Jūryō #9; 8–7	West Jūryō #7; 7–8	East Jūryō #8; 11–4–PP; Champion	East Jūryō #3; 9–6	West Maegashira #14; 6–9
2018	East Maegashira #17; 8–7	East Maegashira #16; 10–5	East Maegashira #11; 4–11	East Jūryō #2; 6–9	East Jūryō #4; 11–4–P	East Maegashira #15; 7–8
2019	East Maegashira #16; 4–11	West Jūryō #3; 7–8	West Jūryō #3; 5–10	East Jūryō #8; 11–4	West Jūryō #1; 6–9	West Jūryō #4; 6–9
2020	East Jūryō #6; 11–4	West Maegashira #17; 5–10	East Jūryō #4; Tournament Cancelled; State of Emergency; 0–0–0	East Jūryō #4; 7–8	West Jūryō #4; 7–8	East Jūryō #5; 9–6
2021	West Jūryō #1; 8–7	West Maegashira #16; 9–6	West Maegashira #13; 7–8	East Maegashira #14; 4–11	East Jūryō #2; 7–8	East Jūryō #2; 6–9
2022	East Jūryō #3; 7–8	East Jūryō #5; 7–8	East Jūryō #6; 11–4–P	West Maegashira #16; 2–9–4	East Jūryō #8; 7–8	East Jūryō #9; 11–4–P
2023	West Jūryō #2; 5–10	West Jūryō #6; 6–9	East Jūryō #9; 7–8	East Jūryō #9; 11–4–P	West Jūryō #2; 7–8	East Jūryō #4; 9–6
2024	East Jūryō #1; 8–7	West Maegashira #16; 7–8	East Jūryō #1; 6–9	West Jūryō #2; 6–9	East Jūryō #5; 4–11	East Jūryō #9; 6–9
2025	East Jūryō #11; 4–11	East Makushita #2; 4–3	West Jūryō #13; 7–8	West Jūryō #13; 6–9	East Makushita #1; 3–4	East Makushita #4; 1–7
2026	West Makushita #17; Retired; 0–0–3	x	x	x	x	x
Record given as wins–losses–absences Top division champion Top division runner-up Retired Non-participation Jūryō Lower divisions Sanshō key: F=Fighting spirit; O=Outstanding performance; T=Technique Also shown: ★=Kinboshi; P=Playoff(s); Divisions: Makuuchi — Jūryō — Makushita — Sandanme — Jonidan — Jonokuchi Makuuchi ranks: Yokozuna — Ōzeki — Sekiwake — Komusubi — Maegashira

== See also ==
- List of sumo tournament second division champions
- Glossary of sumo terms
- List of past sumo wrestlers
