= 2018 in sumo =

The following are the events in professional sumo during 2018.

== Tournaments ==
=== Hatsu basho ===
Ryōgoku Kokugikan, Tokyo, 14 January – 28 January

2018 Hatsu basho results - Makuuchi Division
| W | | L | | A | East | | | Rank | West | | | W | | L | | A |
|---|---|---|---|---|---|---|---|---|---|---|---|---|---|---|---|---|
| 2 | - | 3 | - | 10 | ø | (Mongolia) | Hakuhō | Y | ø | (Japan) | Kisenosato | 1 | - | 5 | - | 9 |
| 11 | - | 4 | - | 0 | | (Mongolia) | **Kakuryū** | Y | | | | | | | | |
| 8 | - | 7 | - | 0 | | (Japan) | **Gōeidō** | O | | (Japan) | **Takayasu** | 12 | - | 3 | - | 0 |
| 8 | - | 7 | - | 0 | | (Japan) | **Mitakeumi** | S | | (Mongolia) | Tamawashi | 6 | - | 9 | - | 0 |
| 5 | - | 10 | - | 0 | | (Japan) | Takakeishō | K | ø | (Japan) | Ōnoshō | 4 | - | 6 | - | 5 |
| 4 | - | 11 | - | 0 | | (Japan) | Hokutofuji | M1 | | (Mongolia) | **Ichinojō** | 10 | - | 5 | - | 0 |
| 4 | - | 11 | - | 0 | | (Japan) | Yoshikaze | M2 | | (Japan) | Kotoshōgiku | 7 | - | 8 | - | 0 |
| 8 | - | 7 | - | 0 | | (Japan) | **Chiyotairyū** | M3 | | (Georgia (country)) | **Tochinoshin** | 14 | - | 1 | - | 0 |
| 7 | - | 8 | - | 0 | | (Japan) | Shōdai | M4 | | (Mongolia) | **Arawashi** | 8 | - | 7 | - | 0 |
| 5 | - | 10 | - | 0 | | (Japan) | Okinoumi | M5 | | (Japan) | **Endō** | 9 | - | 6 | - | 0 |
| 8 | - | 7 | - | 0 | | (Japan) | **Takarafuji** | M6 | | (Japan) | Ikioi | 4 | - | 11 | - | 0 |
| 6 | - | 9 | - | 0 | | (Mongolia) | Chiyoshōma | M7 | | (Japan) | Chiyonokuni | 6 | - | 9 | - | 0 |
| 6 | - | 6 | - | 3 | ø | (Japan) | Tochiōzan | M8 | | (Brazil) | **Kaisei** | 8 | - | 7 | - | 0 |
| 9 | - | 6 | - | 0 | | (Japan) | **Shōhōzan** | M9 | | (Japan) | **Chiyomaru** | 9 | - | 6 | - | 0 |
| 0 | - | 7 | - | 8 | | (Mongolia) | Terunofuji | M10 | | (Japan) | Aminishiki | 3 | - | 9 | - | 3 |
| 7 | - | 8 | - | 0 | | (Japan) | Kotoyūki | M11 | | (Japan) | Daishōmaru | 7 | - | 8 | - | 0 |
| 6 | - | 9 | - | 0 | | (China) | Sōkokurai | M12 | | (Japan) | **Kagayaki** | 9 | - | 6 | - | 0 |
| 5 | - | 10 | - | 0 | | (Japan) | Takekaze | M13 | | (Japan) | **Daieishō** | 9 | - | 6 | - | 0 |
| 10 | - | 5 | - | 0 | | (Japan) | **Abi** | M14 | | (Japan) | **Yutakayama** | 9 | - | 6 | - | 0 |
| 9 | - | 6 | - | 0 | | (Japan) | **Ishiura** | M15 | | (Japan) | **Nishikigi** | 8 | - | 7 | - | 0 |
| 10 | - | 5 | - | 0 | | (Japan) | **Ryūden** | M16 | | (Japan) | **Asanoyama** | 9 | - | 6 | - | 0 |
| 8 | - | 7 | - | 0 | | (Japan) | **Daiamami** | M17 | | | | | | | | |

ø - Indicates a pull-out or absent rank
**winning record in bold**
**Yusho Winner**

=== Haru basho ===
Osaka Prefectural Gymnasium, Osaka, 11 March – 25 March

2018 Haru basho results - Makuuchi Division
| W | | L | | A | East | | | Rank | West | | | W | | L | | A |
|---|---|---|---|---|---|---|---|---|---|---|---|---|---|---|---|---|
| 13 | - | 2 | - | 0 | | (Mongolia) | **Kakuryū** | Y | ø | (Mongolia) | Hakuhō | 0 | - | 0 | - | 15 |
| 0 | - | 0 | - | 15 | ø | (Japan) | Kisenosato | Y | | | | | | | | |
| 12 | - | 3 | - | 0 | | (Japan) | **Takayasu** | O | | (Japan) | **Gōeidō** | 9 | - | 6 | - | 0 |
| 7 | - | 8 | - | 0 | | (Japan) | Mitakeumi | S | | (Georgia (country)) | **Tochinoshin** | 10 | - | 5 | - | 0 |
| 9 | - | 6 | - | 0 | | (Mongolia) | **Ichinojō** | K | | (Japan) | Chiyotairyū | 4 | - | 11 | - | 0 |
| 9 | - | 6 | - | 0 | | (Japan) | **Endō** | M1 | | (Mongolia) | **Tamawashi** | 9 | - | 6 | - | 0 |
| 2 | - | 13 | - | 0 | | (Japan) | Arawashi | M2 | | (Japan) | Takarafuji | 5 | - | 10 | - | 0 |
| 3 | - | 7 | - | 5 | ø | (Japan) | Takakeishō | M3 | | (Japan) | Kotoshōgiku | 6 | - | 9 | - | 0 |
| 8 | - | 7 | - | 0 | | (Japan) | **Shōhōzan** | M4 | | (Japan) | Shōdai | 7 | - | 8 | - | 0 |
| 6 | - | 9 | - | 0 | | (Japan) | Chiyomaru | M5 | ø | (Japan) | Ōnoshō | 0 | - | 0 | - | 15 |
| 12 | - | 3 | - | 0 | | (Brazil) | **Kaisei** | M6 | | (Japan) | Hokutofuji | 6 | - | 9 | - | 0 |
| 10 | - | 5 | - | 0 | | (Japan) | **Abi** | M7 | | (Japan) | Yoshikaze | 7 | - | 8 | - | 0 |
| 7 | - | 8 | - | 0 | | (Japan) | Kagayaki | M8 | | (Japan) | **Daieishō** | 9 | - | 6 | - | 0 |
| 7 | - | 8 | - | 0 | | (Japan) | Okinoumi | M9 | | (Japan) | **Ryūden** | 8 | - | 7 | - | 0 |
| 9 | - | 6 | - | 0 | | (Mongolia) | **Chiyoshōma** | M10 | | (Japan) | Chiyonokuni | 7 | - | 8 | - | 0 |
| 5 | - | 10 | - | 0 | | (Japan) | Tochiōzan | M11 | | (Japan) | **Yutakayama** | 10 | - | 5 | - | 0 |
| 7 | - | 8 | - | 0 | | (Japan) | Ishiura | M12 | | (Japan) | Kotoyūki | 1 | - | 13 | - | 1 |
| 9 | - | 6 | - | 0 | | (Japan) | **Daishōmaru** | M13 | | (Japan) | **Asanoyama** | 8 | - | 7 | - | 0 |
| 11 | - | 4 | - | 0 | | (Japan) | **Ikioi** | M14 | | (Japan) | Nishikigi | 5 | - | 10 | - | 0 |
| 5 | - | 6 | - | 4 | ø | (China) | Sōkokurai | M15 | | (Japan) | Myōgiryū | 6 | - | 9 | - | 0 |
| 10 | - | 5 | - | 0 | | (Japan) | **Daiamami** | M16 | | (Japan) | Hidenoumi | 3 | - | 12 | - | 0 |
| 8 | - | 7 | - | 0 | | (Bulgaria) | **Aoiyama** | M17 | | | | | | | | |

ø - Indicates a pull-out or absent rank
**winning record in bold**
**Yusho Winner**

=== Natsu basho ===
Ryōgoku Kokugikan, Tokyo, 13 May – 27 May

2018 Natsu basho results - Makuuchi Division
| W | | L | | A | East | | | Rank | West | | | W | | L | | A |
|---|---|---|---|---|---|---|---|---|---|---|---|---|---|---|---|---|
| 14 | - | 1 | - | 0 | | (Mongolia) | **Kakuryū** | Y | | (Mongolia) | **Hakuhō** | 11 | - | 4 | - | 0 |
| 0 | - | 0 | - | 15 | ø | (Japan) | Kisenosato | Y | | | | | | | | |
| 0 | - | 0 | - | 15 | ø | (Japan) | Takayasu | O | ø | (Japan) | Gōeidō | 3 | - | 6 | - | 6 |
| 13 | - | 2 | - | 0 | | (Georgia (country)) | **Tochinoshin** | S | | (Mongolia) | **Ichinojō** | 8 | - | 7 | - | 0 |
| 9 | - | 6 | - | 0 | | (Japan) | **Mitakeumi** | K | | (Japan) | Endō | 3 | - | 10 | - | 2 |
| 8 | - | 7 | - | 0 | | (Mongolia) | **Tamawashi** | M1 | | (Brazil) | Kaisei | 6 | - | 9 | - | 0 |
| 8 | - | 7 | - | 0 | | (Japan) | **Shōhōzan** | M2 | | (Japan) | Abi | 7 | - | 8 | - | 0 |
| 5 | - | 10 | - | 0 | | (Japan) | Daieishō | M3 | | (Japan) | Yutakayama | 2 | - | 13 | - | 0 |
| 6 | - | 9 | - | 0 | | (Japan) | Chiyotairyū | M4 | | (Japan) | **Shōdai** | 9 | - | 6 | - | 0 |
| 8 | - | 7 | - | 0 | | (Japan) | **Kotoshōgiku** | M5 | | (Japan) | **Ikioi** | 8 | - | 7 | - | 0 |
| 6 | - | 9 | - | 0 | | (Mongolia) | Chiyoshōma | M6 | | (Japan) | Takarafuji | 7 | - | 8 | - | 0 |
| 3 | - | 12 | - | 0 | | (Japan) | Ryūden | M7 | | (Japan) | Chiyomaru | 4 | - | 11 | - | 0 |
| 8 | - | 7 | - | 0 | | (Japan) | **Yoshikaze** | M8 | | (Japan) | **Kagayaki** | 9 | - | 6 | - | 0 |
| 9 | - | 6 | - | 0 | | (Japan) | **Daishōmaru** | M9 | ø | (Japan) | Hokutofuji | 4 | - | 7 | - | 4 |
| 5 | - | 10 | - | 0 | | (Japan) | Okinoumi | M10 | | (Japan) | **Takakeishō** | 10 | - | 5 | - | 0 |
| 4 | - | 11 | - | 0 | | (Japan) | Daiamami | M11 | | (Japan) | **Chiyonokuni** | 12 | - | 3 | - | 0 |
| 7 | - | 8 | - | 0 | | (Mongolia) | Arawashi | M12 | | (Japan) | Asanoyama | 7 | - | 8 | - | 0 |
| 6 | - | 9 | - | 0 | | (Japan) | Ishiura | M13 | | (Bulgaria) | **Aoiyama** | 8 | - | 7 | - | 0 |
| 8 | - | 7 | - | 0 | | (Japan) | **Sadanoumi** | M14 | | (Japan) | Takekaze | 6 | - | 9 | - | 0 |
| 8 | - | 7 | - | 0 | | (Japan) | **Tochiōzan** | M15 | | (Japan) | **Kyokutaisei** | 10 | - | 5 | - | 0 |
| 10 | - | 5 | - | 0 | | (Japan) | **Myōgiryū** | M16 | | (Japan) | Aminishiki | 4 | - | 11 | - | 0 |
| 10 | - | 5 | - | 0 | | (Japan) | **Nishikigi** | M17 | | | | | | | | |

ø - Indicates a pull-out or absent rank
**winning record in bold**
**Yusho Winner**

=== Nagoya basho ===
Aichi Prefectural Gymnasium, Nagoya, 8 July – 22 July

2018 Nagoya basho results - Makuuchi Division
| W | | L | | A | East | | | Rank | West | | | W | | L | | A |
|---|---|---|---|---|---|---|---|---|---|---|---|---|---|---|---|---|
| 3 | - | 2 | - | 10 | ø | (Mongolia) | Kakuryū | Y | ø | (Mongolia) | Hakuhō | 3 | - | 1 | - | 11 |
| 0 | - | 0 | - | 15 | ø | (Japan) | Kisenosato | Y | | | | | | | | |
| 10 | - | 5 | - | 0 | | (Japan) | **Gōeidō** | O | | (Japan) | **Takayasu** | 9 | - | 6 | - | 0 |
| | | | | | | | | O | ø | (Georgia (country)) | Tochinoshin | 5 | - | 2 | - | 8 |
| 8 | - | 7 | - | 0 | | (Mongolia) | **Ichinojō** | S | | (Japan) | **Mitakeumi** | 13 | - | 2 | - | 0 |
| 8 | - | 7 | - | 0 | | (Mongolia) | **Tamawashi** | K | | (Japan) | Shōhōzan | 3 | - | 12 | - | 0 |
| 6 | - | 9 | - | 0 | | (Japan) | Shōdai | M1 | ø | (Japan) | Kotoshōgiku | 3 | - | 7 | - | 5 |
| 8 | - | 7 | - | 0 | | (Japan) | **Ikioi** | M2 | ø | (Japan) | Chiyonokuni | 6 | - | 6 | - | 3 |
| 6 | - | 9 | - | 0 | | (Japan) | Abi | M3 | | (Japan) | **Takakeishō** | 10 | - | 5 | - | 0 |
| 9 | - | 6 | - | 0 | | (Brazil) | **Kaisei** | M4 | | (Japan) | Kagayaki | 6 | - | 9 | - | 0 |
| 5 | - | 10 | - | 0 | | (Japan) | Daishōmaru | M5 | | (Japan) | Yoshikaze | 2 | - | 13 | - | 0 |
| 8 | - | 7 | - | 0 | | (Japan) | **Endō** | M6 | | (Japan) | **Chiyotairyū** | 9 | - | 6 | - | 0 |
| 7 | - | 8 | - | 0 | | (Japan) | Takarafuji | M7 | | (Japan) | Daieishō | 6 | - | 9 | - | 0 |
| 4 | - | 10 | - | 1 | ø | (Mongolia) | Chiyoshōma | M8 | | (Japan) | Kyokutaisei | 6 | - | 9 | - | 0 |
| 9 | - | 6 | - | 0 | | (Japan) | **Myōgiryū** | M9 | | (Japan) | **Yutakayama** | 12 | - | 3 | - | 0 |
| 5 | - | 10 | - | 0 | | (Japan) | Chiyomaru | M10 | | (Japan) | Nishikigi | 6 | - | 9 | - | 0 |
| 8 | - | 7 | - | 0 | | (Bulgaria) | **Aoiyama** | M11 | | (Japan) | **Ōnoshō** | 10 | - | 5 | - | 0 |
| 8 | - | 7 | - | 0 | | (Japan) | **Sadanoumi** | M12 | | (Mongolia) | Arawashi | 5 | - | 10 | - | 0 |
| 10 | - | 5 | - | 0 | | (Japan) | **Tochiōzan** | M13 | | (Japan) | **Asanoyama** | 11 | - | 4 | - | 0 |
| 3 | - | 12 | - | 0 | | (Japan) | Kotoekō | M14 | | (Japan) | **Okinoumi** | 8 | - | 7 | - | 0 |
| 7 | - | 8 | - | 0 | | (Japan) | Ishiura | M15 | | (Japan) | **Ryūden** | 8 | - | 7 | - | 0 |
| 11 | - | 4 | - | 0 | | (Japan) | **Hokutofuji** | M16 | | (Japan) | Meisei | 6 | - | 9 | - | 0 |

ø - Indicates a pull-out or absent rank
**winning record in bold**
**Yusho Winner**

=== Aki basho ===
Ryōgoku Kokugikan, Tokyo, 9 September – 23 September

2018 Aki basho results - Makuuchi Division
| W | | L | | A | East | | Rank | West | | | W | | L | | A |
|---|---|---|---|---|---|---|---|---|---|---|---|---|---|---|---|
| 10 | - | 5 | - | 0 | (Mongolia) | **Kakuryū** | Y | | (Mongolia) | **Hakuhō** | 15 | - | 0 | - | 0 |
| 10 | - | 5 | - | 0 | (Japan) | **Kisenosato** | Y | | | | | | | | |
| 12 | - | 3 | - | 0 | (Japan) | **Gōeidō** | O | | (Japan) | **Takayasu** | 11 | - | 4 | - | 0 |
| | | | | | | | O | | (Georgia (country)) | **Tochinoshin** | 9 | - | 6 | - | 0 |
| 9 | - | 6 | - | 0 | (Japan) | **Mitakeumi** | S | | (Mongolia) | **Ichinojō** | 8 | - | 7 | - | 0 |
| 4 | - | 11 | - | 0 | (Mongolia) | Tamawashi | K | | (Japan) | **Takakeishō** | 9 | - | 6 | - | 0 |
| 3 | - | 12 | - | 0 | (Japan) | Ikioi | M1 | | (Brazil) | **Kaisei** | 8 | - | 7 | - | 0 |
| 3 | - | 10 | - | 2 | (Japan) | Yutakayama | M2 | | (Japan) | Chiyotairyū | 5 | - | 10 | - | 0 |
| 6 | - | 9 | - | 0 | (Japan) | Shōdai | M3 | | (Japan) | Endō | 3 | - | 12 | - | 0 |
| 4 | - | 11 | - | 0 | (Japan) | Chiyonokuni | M4 | | (Japan) | Abi | 6 | - | 9 | - | 0 |
| 8 | - | 7 | - | 0 | (Japan) | **Myōgiryū** | M5 | | (Japan) | Asanoyama | 7 | - | 8 | - | 0 |
| 7 | - | 8 | - | 0 | (Japan) | Kagayaki | M6 | | (Japan) | Ōnoshō | 4 | - | 11 | - | 0 |
| 7 | - | 8 | - | 0 | (Japan) | Shōhōzan | M7 | | (Japan) | **Tochiōzan** | 8 | - | 7 | - | 0 |
| 7 | - | 8 | - | 0 | (Japan) | Takarafuji | M8 | | (Japan) | Kotoshōgiku | 7 | - | 8 | - | 0 |
| 9 | - | 6 | - | 0 | (Japan) | **Hokutofuji** | M9 | | (Japan) | Daishōmaru | 5 | - | 10 | - | 0 |
| 7 | - | 8 | - | 0 | (Bulgaria) | Aoiyama | M10 | | (Japan) | **Daieishō** | 8 | - | 7 | - | 0 |
| 8 | - | 7 | - | 0 | (Japan) | **Sadanoumi** | M11 | ø | (Japan) | Kyokutaisei | 1 | - | 6 | - | 8 |
| 8 | - | 7 | - | 0 | (Japan) | **Okinoumi** | M12 | | (Japan) | **Nishikigi** | 10 | - | 5 | - | 0 |
| 10 | - | 5 | - | 0 | (Japan) | **Ryūden** | M13 | | (Mongolia) | **Takanoiwa** | 10 | - | 5 | - | 0 |
| 8 | - | 7 | - | 0 | (Japan) | **Takanoshō** | M14 | ø | (Japan) | Chiyomaru | 6 | - | 9 | - | 0 |
| 8 | - | 7 | - | 0 | (Mongolia) | **Chiyoshōma** | M15 | | (Japan) | **Yoshikaze** | 11 | - | 4 | - | 0 |
| 6 | - | 9 | - | 0 | (Japan) | Kotoyūki | M16 | | (Japan) | Ishiura | 4 | - | 11 | - | 0 |

ø - Indicates a pull-out or absent rank
**winning record in bold**
**Yusho Winner**

=== Kyushu basho ===
Fukuoka Kokusai Center, Kyushu, 11 November – 25 November

2018 Kyushu basho results - Makuuchi Division
| W | | L | | A | East | | | Rank | West | | | W | | L | | A |
|---|---|---|---|---|---|---|---|---|---|---|---|---|---|---|---|---|
| 0 | - | 0 | - | 15 | ø | (Mongolia) | Hakuhō | Y | ø | (Mongolia) | Kakuryū | 0 | - | 0 | - | 15 |
| 0 | - | 4 | - | 11 | ø | (Japan) | Kisenosato | Y | | | | | | | | |
| 8 | - | 4 | - | 3 | ø | (Japan) | **Gōeidō** | O | | (Japan) | **Takayasu** | 12 | - | 3 | - | 0 |
| | | | | | | | | O | | (Georgia (country)) | **Tochinoshin** | 8 | - | 7 | - | 0 |
| 7 | - | 8 | - | 0 | | (Japan) | Mitakeumi | S | | (Mongolia) | Ichinojō | 6 | - | 9 | - | 0 |
| 13 | - | 2 | - | 0 | | (Japan) | **Takakeishō** | K | ø | (Brazil) | Kaisei | 3 | - | 9 | - | 3 |
| 8 | - | 7 | - | 0 | | (Japan) | **Myōgiryū** | M1 | | (Japan) | Hokutofuji | 7 | - | 8 | - | 0 |
| 8 | - | 7 | - | 0 | | (Japan) | **Tochiōzan** | M2 | | (Mongolia) | **Tamawashi** | 9 | - | 6 | - | 0 |
| 8 | - | 7 | - | 0 | | (Japan) | **Nishikigi** | M3 | | (Japan) | Ryūden | 6 | - | 9 | - | 0 |
| 8 | - | 7 | - | 0 | | (Japan) | **Shōdai** | M4 | | (Japan) | Yoshikaze | 7 | - | 8 | - | 0 |
| 7 | - | 8 | - | 0 | | (Japan) | Chiyotairyū | M5 | | (Japan) | Asanoyama | 6 | - | 9 | - | 0 |
| 6 | - | 9 | - | 0 | | (Mongolia) | Takanoiwa | M6 | | (Japan) | Kagayaki | 5 | - | 10 | - | 0 |
| 6 | - | 9 | - | 0 | | (Japan) | Abi | M7 | | (Japan) | **Shōhōzan** | 10 | - | 5 | - | 0 |
| 6 | - | 9 | - | 0 | | (Japan) | Ikioi | M8 | | (Japan) | Takarafuji | 7 | - | 8 | - | 0 |
| 10 | - | 5 | - | 0 | | (Japan) | **Kotoshōgiku** | M9 | | (Japan) | **Daieishō** | 9 | - | 6 | - | 0 |
| 7 | - | 8 | - | 0 | | (Japan) | Sadanoumi | M10 | | (Japan) | Yutakayama | 5 | - | 10 | - | 0 |
| 5 | - | 10 | - | 0 | | (Japan) | Chiyonokuni | M11 | | (Japan) | **Okinoumi** | 11 | - | 4 | - | 0 |
| 11 | - | 4 | - | 0 | | (Bulgaria) | **Aoiyama** | M12 | | (Japan) | **Endō** | 9 | - | 6 | - | 0 |
| 11 | - | 4 | - | 0 | | (Japan) | **Ōnoshō** | M13 | | (Japan) | Takanoshō | 4 | - | 11 | - | 0 |
| 7 | - | 8 | - | 0 | | (Mongolia) | Chiyoshōma | M14 | | (Japan) | Daishōmaru | 6 | - | 9 | - | 0 |
| 7 | - | 8 | - | 0 | | (Japan) | Daiamami | M15 | | (Japan) | **Meisei** | 9 | - | 6 | - | 0 |
| 1 | - | 12 | - | 2 | ø | (Mongolia) | Arawashi | M16 | | (Japan) | Chiyomaru | 4 | - | 11 | - | 1 |

ø - Indicates a pull-out or absent rank
**winning record in bold**
**Yusho Winner**

== News ==
=== January ===
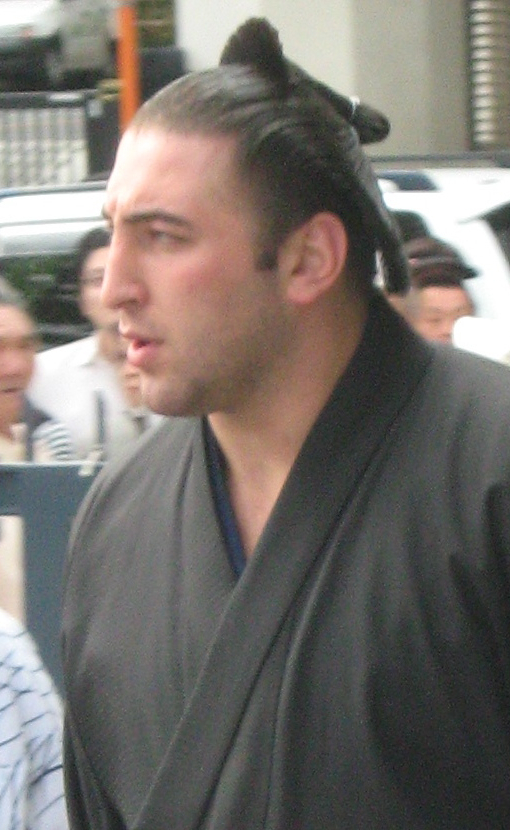
Tochinoshin was the surprise winner of the January tournament

- 6: The highest ranked referee, Shikimori Inosuke, is reported in the Japanese media to have apologized for sexually harassing a junior referee in a hotel in Okinawa Prefecture on December 16 last year, while drunk.
- 9: The three current yokozuna, Hakuhō, Kakuryū and Kisenosato, perform the traditional New Year dohyo-iri ceremony at the Meiji Shrine.
- 14: The Sumo Association suspend Shikimori Inosuke for three tournaments. He has already submitted his resignation, but it will not take effect until after the suspension ends in May 2018. With the other top referee title (Kimura Shonosuke) currently vacant, this will be the first time since the March 1994 tournament that neither of the head referees (tate-gyōji) will be available.
- 11: Kakuryū and Kisenosato, both of whom have missed some or all of the preceding four tournaments, each confirm that they will enter the forthcoming Hatsu basho.
- 22: Egyptian juryo division wrestler Ōsunaarashi withdraws from the tournament after reports emerge that he was involved in a rear-end motor collision at the Yamanouchi, Nagano ski resort town on January 3. Osunaarashi apparently defied the Sumo Association's ban on wrestlers driving cars, and also did not have a valid licence. He initially told police that his pregnant wife was driving and he switched seats to protect her, but back-tracked when confronted with security video evidence.
- 25: A lawsuit against Kasugano Oyakata and a former member of Kasugano stable who had been convicted of assault, is publicly revealed for the first time. The victim, another former wrestler from the stable, alleges that Kasugano failed to prevent the attack and delayed medical treatment.
- 27: The championship is won by maegashira Tochinoshin, who defeats Shōhōzan to move to an unassailable two-win lead of 13 wins against just one loss. It is the first championship by a maegashira since Kyokutenhō in 2012.
- 28: On the final day of the Hatsu Basho, Tochinoshin wins again to finish on 14–1, two wins ahead of ōzeki Takayasu on 12–3. Kakuryū, the only yokozuna to complete the tournament, stops a run of four straight defeats by beating ōzeki Gōeidō to finish with a respectable 11–4 record on his comeback. Tochinoshin receives special prizes for Outstanding Performance and Technique to go with his first Emperor's Cup, while the Fighting Spirit Award is shared between top division debutants Ryūden and Abi, who both score 10–5. The jūryō division championship is won by Myōgiryū for the third time, after a playoff with Hidenoumi. Retiring this tournament are former maegashira Shōtenrō, Kitataiki and Sōtairyū.
- 31: Seven promotions to the jūryō division for the March tournament in Osaka are announced. There are two newcomers, Enhō (who ties the record for fastest postwar promotion to jūryō at six tournaments) and Takayoshitoshi (meaning he and Takagenji have become the first identical twins to both be ranked as sekitori) while Yago, Terutsuyoshi, Shimanoumi, Tobizaru and Akiseyama return.

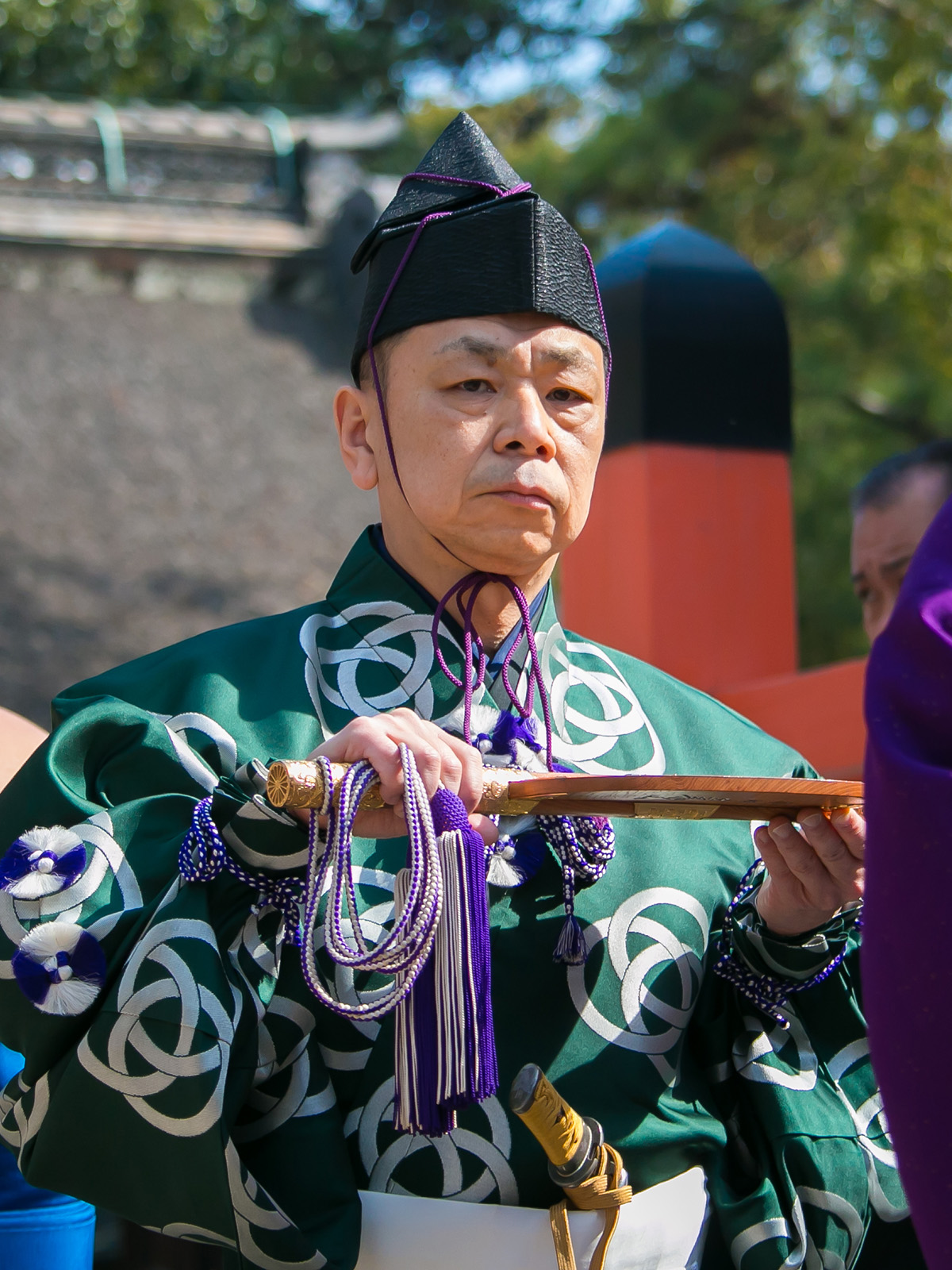
The 40th Shikimori Inosuke was suspended in January

=== February ===
- 1: Nishiiwa Oyakata, the former sekiwake Wakanosato, branches out from Tagonoura stable and establishes his own Nishiiwa stable, taking two low-ranked wrestlers with him from the parent stable.
- 2: Elections to the 10 man Board of Directors of the Japan Sumo Association are held. Isegahama Oyakata (ex-Asahifuji) and Nishonoseki Oyakata (ex-Wakashimazu) do not run for re-election. The eleven candidates running are Kasugano, Sakaigawa, Dewanoumi and Yamahibiki from Dewanoumi ichimon, Oguruma and Shibatayama from Nishonoseki ichimon, Kagamiyama from Tokitsukaze ichimon, Hakkaku from Takasago ichimon, Takashima from Isegahama ichimon, and Takanohana and Ōnomatsu from Takanohana ichimon. The man to miss out is Takanohana, who receives only two votes from the 101 elders who participated. He had been dismissed from the board at the end of December following his lack of co-operation with the Sumo Association's investigation into the Harumafuji assault on Takanoiwa last year.
- 3: Sōtairyū's danpatsu-shiki or official retirement ceremony is held at the Ryōgoku Kokugikan with around 300 guests. Sōtairyū is leaving the sumo world.
- 4: Former sekiwake Asasekiryū, who retired last May, has his danpatsu-shiki at the Kokugikan. He is now officially Nishikijima Oyakata.
- 8: An outside committee led by a former prosecutor general, Keiichi Tadaki, is formed and will interview all 900 wrestlers in the Sumo Association in response to a series of incidents since Harumafuji's retirement. Tadaki says, "Our goal is the preservation of sumo. It is important to grasp the reality."
- 11: The 42nd Fuji TV Grand Sumo Tournament takes place at the Kokugikan. A knock-out format exhibition with a 2,500,000 yen prize for the yusho, it is won by Tochinoshin who defeats Ikioi, Hakuhō (who he has never beaten in official competition in 25 attempts), Hokutofuji, Okinoumi and finally Tamawashi.

=== March ===
- 9: Ōsunaarashi is asked to retire by the Sumo Association over his involvement in the vehicle collision and driving without a license. He had been fined 500,000 yen ($4700) by a court over the incident in Nagano Prefecture in January. Ōsunaarashi agrees to the request.
- 18: New juryo Takayoshitoshi withdraws from the Osaka tournament after admitting he struck a junior wrestler who was acting as a personal attendant several times in the dressing room after his Day 8 bout. Takayoshitoshi was reportedly angry that the attendant had not informed him when he was due to enter the arena, making him late for his match.
- 23: Takanohana indicates that he will drop his legal complaint against the Sumo Association and admits responsibility for Takayoshitoshi's behavior, as his stablemaster.
- 25: On the final day Takayasu defeats Kakuryu after a re-match to finish one win behind the yokozuna on 12–3. Kakuryu had clinched his fourth championship the previous day, and his only other defeat was to Tochinoshin, who wins the Outstanding Performance Award. Brazilian Kaisei is a surprise joint runner-up with Takayasu on 12–3 and wins the Fighting Spirit Prize. The Technique Award goes to Endō, who for the first time gets a winning record at the top maegashira rank. The jūryō championship is won by Sadanoumi after a playoff with Akiseyama while veteran Higonojō takes the makushita title. Retiring is Kotomisen, who spent two tournaments in jūryō in 2013.
- 29: Takanohana is demoted two further ranks in the Sumo Association hierarchy, to the lowest rank of toshiyori. Takayoshitoshi is suspended from the next tournament in May.

=== April ===
- 1: Futagoyama Oyakata, the former ozeki Miyabiyama, branches out from Fujishima stable and establishes his own Futagoyama stable, taking five low ranked wrestlers with him.
- The spring regional tour visits the following locations:
  - 1: Ise Shrine Honozumo, Mie Prefecture
  - 2: Nakatsugawa, Gifu Prefecture
  - 3: Sakai, Osaka Prefecture
  - 4: Maizuru, Kyoto Prefecture. Chairman Hakkaku issues an apology after a referee ordered women off the dohyo when they were trying to administer first aid to the mayor of Maizuru, who had just collapsed with a subarachnoid hemorrhage while giving a speech. Hakkaku says, "In a situation that could have been life-threatening it was an inappropriate response."
  - 5: Himeji, Hyogo Prefecture
  - 6: Takarazuka, Hyogo Prefecture. The female mayor of Takarazuka, who had to stand next to the dohyo instead of entering it at the exhibition, meets with the Sumo Association's public relations chief Shibatayama on April 18, and asks that they reconsider the longstanding "no women" policy.
  - 7: Kariya, Aichi Prefecture
  - 8: Shizuoka, Shizuoka Prefecture
  - 9: Kakegawa, Shizuoka Prefecture
  - 10: Ina, Nagano Prefecture
  - 11: Tomi, Nagano Prefecture
  - 12: Soka, Saitama Prefecture
  - 13: Kawasaki, Kanagawa Prefecture
  - 14: Fujisawa, Kanagawa Prefecture
  - 15: Takasaki, Gunma Prefecture
  - 16: Yasukuni Shrine Honozumo, Tokyo Prefecture
  - 18-19: Kashiwa, Chiba Prefecture
  - 20: Machida, Tokyo Prefecture
  - 21: Hachioji, Tokyo Prefecture
  - 22: Ome, Tokyo Prefecture
  - 24: Toride, Ibaraki Prefecture
  - 25: Kasama, Ibaraki Prefecture
  - 27: Koshigaya, Saitama Prefecture
- 28: At an extraordinary meeting of its board, the Sumo Association clarifies that women can enter the dohyo in an emergency situation and will consider outside opinions from experts and members of the public over whether its ban should be overturned.
- 30: The banzuke for the upcoming Natsu tournament in May is released. Kyokutaisei makes his makuuchi debut, while Sadanoumi, Takekaze and Aminishiki return. Endō makes his sanyaku debut at komusubi. There are two new promotions to jūryō, Takadagawa stable's Hakuyozan and former Toyo University amateur Wakatakakage, who becomes the third sandanme tsukedashi entrant to reach sekitori status. Asabenkei returns to jūryō for the first time since September 2016.

=== May ===
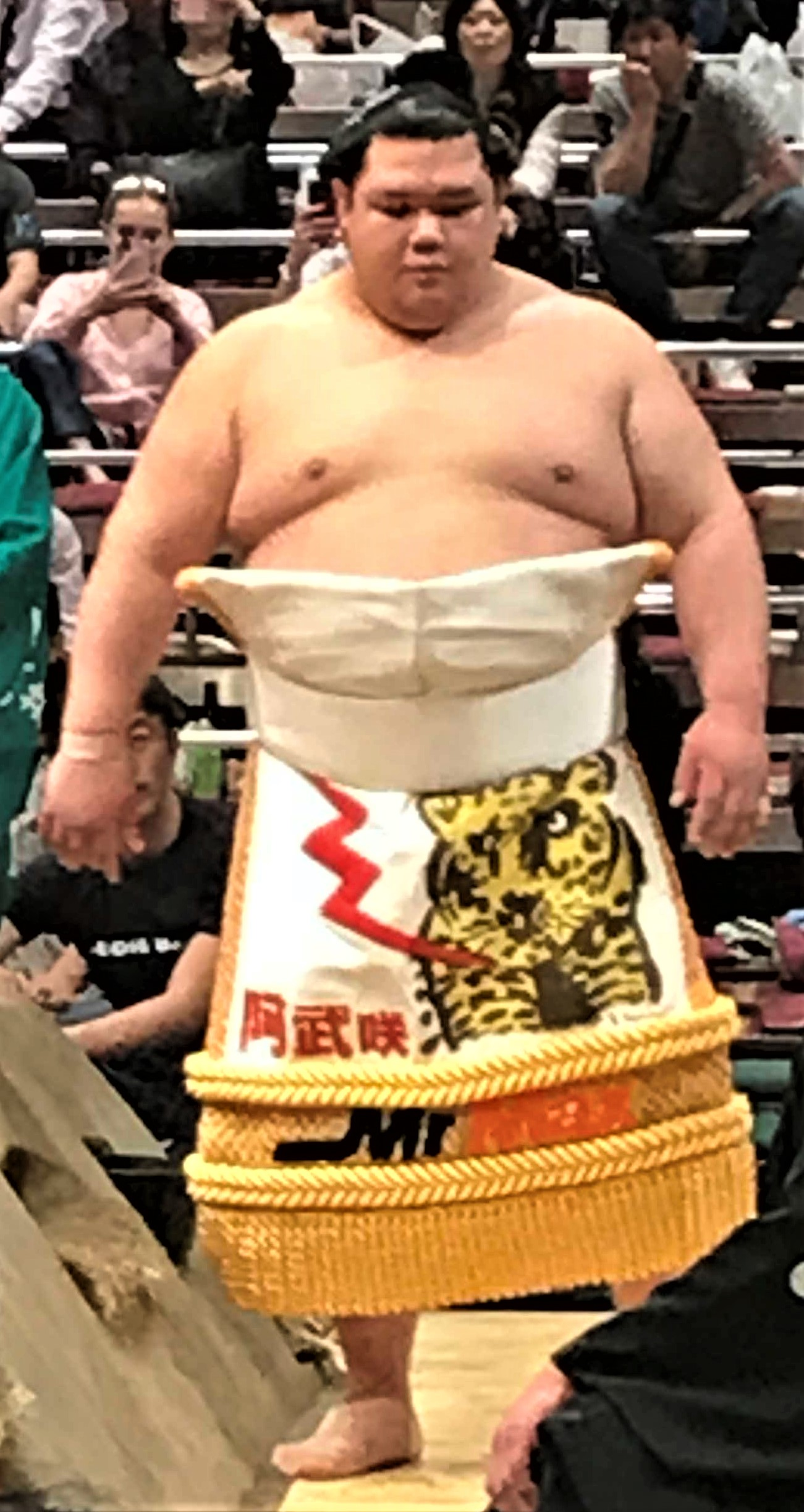
Ōnosho pictured during the May 2018 tournament in which he won the jūryō division championship

- 11: Former maegashira Ōiwato announces his retirement. Last year he became the oldest winner of the makushita division championship in the six tournaments a year era. He plans to work for an electronic recycling company in Kanagawa Prefecture.
- 11: The Tagonoura stable duo of Kisenosato and Takayasu both announce they will miss the beginning of the May tournament. For Kisenosato it will be the seventh straight basho he has failed to complete, equaling the unwanted record of most yokozuna absences post-1958 set by Takanohana who sat out seven full tournaments in 2001 and 2002. Takanohana did make a successful comeback with a 12–3 record in September 2002 and tells Kisenosato, "He should take his time to heal. As long as he's fighting he should be in top shape. The key is not to rush." Kisenosato's stablemaster Tagonoura says doctors have told the yokozuna he should stay away from intense training for a month, and will "fight for his life" when he next competes in July. Takayasu injured his left upper arm in training earlier in the week but still hopes to enter the tournament at some point.
- 14: Former maegashira Amūru of Russia, who has fallen to makushita, announces his retirement.
- 21: The only ōzeki competing in the May tournament, Gōeidō, pulls out with an ankle injury, making this the first time since 1949 that the only two ōzeki on the banzuke have withdrawn from a tournament.
- 27: The championship is decided in the final bout of the tournament, with Kakuryū defeating Hakuhō to clinch his second successive yūshō with a 14–1 record, avoiding the need for a playoff with Tochinoshin, who finishes on 13–2. Tochinoshin wins the Technique and Fighting Spirit Prizes, and with 37 wins over the last three tournaments is assured of ōzeki promotion. Also sharing the Fighting Spirit Prize are Kyokutaisei, who scores 10–5 in his makuuchi debut, and Chiyonokuni, who produces his best ever record of 12–3. The Outstanding Performance prize goes to Shōhōzan, who is the only man to defeat Kakuryū. In the jūryō division former komusubi Ōnoshō comes back strongly from injury to take the championship with a 12–3 record. Retiring along with the previously announced Ōiwato and Amūru is former jūryō Masakaze who is suffering from illness. The jonidan championship is won by Hoshoryu, nephew of former yokozuna Asashōryū.
- 30: Promotions to the jūryō division are announced. There are two newcomers:Chiyonoumi, who is the first sekitori produced by the current Kokonoe stablemaster, ex-ozeki Chiyotaikai and the first new sekitori from Kōchi Prefecture since Tosayutaka in 2008, and Churanoumi (formerly Kizaki), a Nihon University graduate from Okinawa Prefecture. Earning promotion to jūryō for a record ninth time is veteran Kizenryu.
- 30: Tochinoshin's promotion to ōzeki is confirmed. Unusually, he thanks his stablemaster, Kasugano Oyakata, in his acceptance speech.

=== June ===
- 5: Tochinoshin returns to his homeland of Georgia for the first time since last May and meets President Giorgi Margvelashvili. Tochinoshin says he wants to help build the first dohyō in the country.
- 7: Police say that Takayoshitoshi has been reported to prosecutors in the case over striking his attendant. He has already reached an out of court settlement with the victim.
- 25: The rankings for the Nagoya tournament in July are released, with Tochinoshin listed as ōzeki for the first time. Both of his fellow ōzeki, Gōeidō and Takayasu, are kadoban (in danger of demotion). There are two newcomers to the top division, Kotoeko and Meisei, with Ōnoshō returning.

=== July ===
- 2: Kisenosato faces fellow yokozuna Hakuhō in a training session (degeiko) at Kokonoe stable, the first time the two have sparred in over a year.
- 5: Kisenosato announces that he will miss the forthcoming Nagoya basho, making it the eighth straight tournament he has failed to complete. This is a record for a yokozuna.
- 13: Kakuryū withdraws through injury on Day 6 of the Nagoya tournament, joining Hakuhō who pulled out on Day 4 and Kisenosato who was absent from the beginning. It is the first time since 1999 that all three yokozuna have failed to complete a tournament.
- 14: Tochinoshin is forced to withdraw from his debut tournament as an ōzeki due to a toe injury suffered in the previous day's bout. He had won his first five matches, but will now be kadoban in the September tournament.
- 21: Mitakeumi wins his first championship by defeating Tochiozan on Day 14 which gives him a 13–1 record and an unassailable two win lead going into the final day. He is the first wrestler from Dewanoumi stable to win a top division championship since 1980, and also the first Japanese wrestler born in the Heisei era to do so.
- 22: Mitakeumi is defeated on the final day by Yutakayama and finishes on 13–2, but also wins special prizes for Outstanding Performance and Technique. Yutakayama is the runner-up on 12–3 and shares the Fighting Spirit prize with Asanoyama, who finishes on 11–4. The juryo championship is won by Takanoiwa, who is set to return to makuuchi for the first time since his assault by Harumafuji. The makushita championship is won by Hakuyozan, and the sandanme title goes to former maegashira Kagamio.

The summer tour visits the following locations:

- 29: Ogaki, Gifu Prefecture
- 30: Otsu, Shiga Prefecture
- 31: Katsuyama, Fukui Prefecture

=== August ===
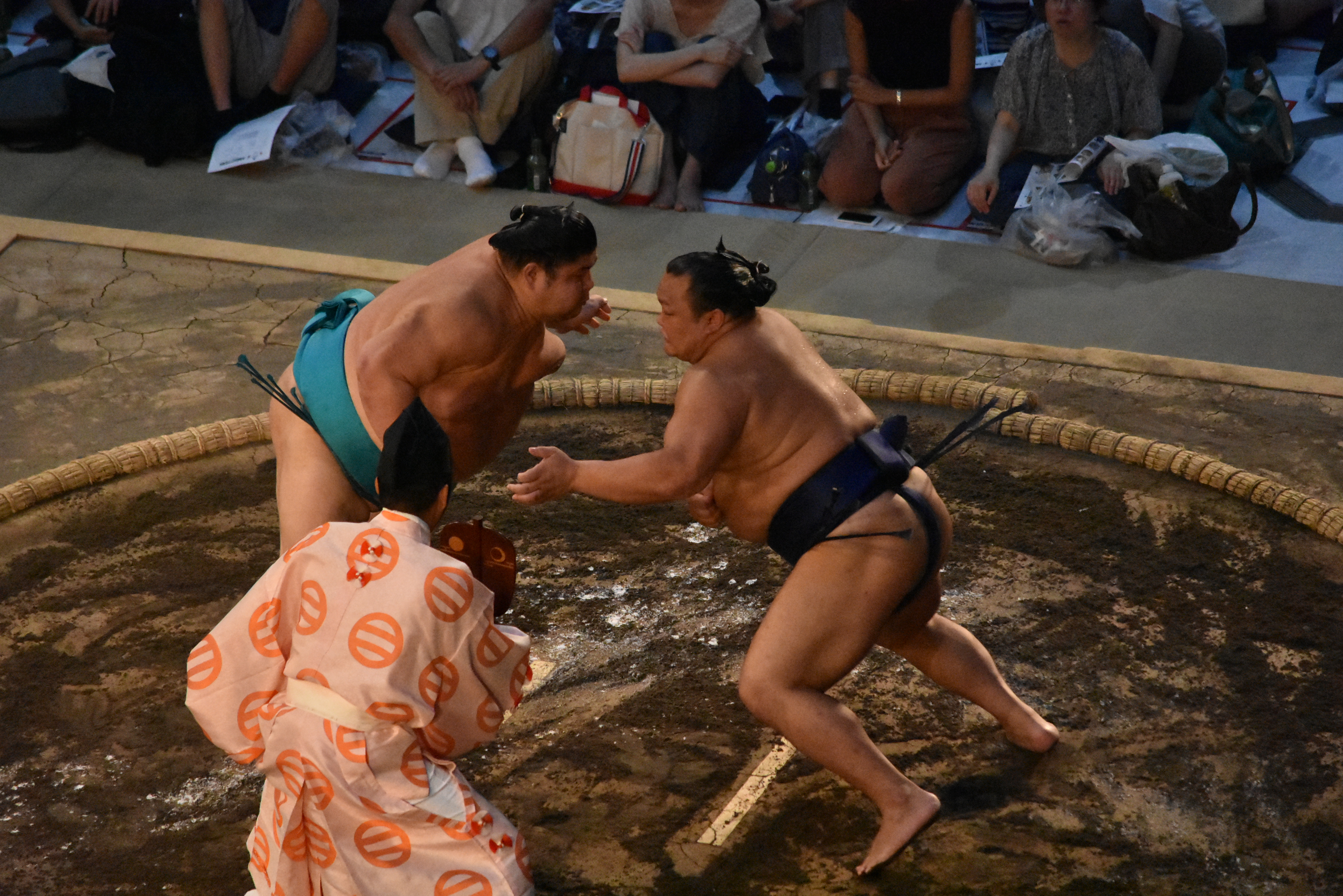
The KITTE exhibition on 26 August

- 1: Komatsu, Ishikawa Prefecture
- 2: Uozu, Toyama Prefecture
- 3: Yuzawa, Niigata Prefecture
- 4: Niigata, Niigata Prefecture
- 5: Nagano, Nagano Prefecture
- 6: Shimosuwa, Nagano Prefecture
- 7: Tokorozawa, Saitama Prefecture
- 8: Aoyama, Tokyo Prefecture
- 9: Ryugasaki, Ibaraki Prefecture
- 10: Shirakawa, Fukushima Prefecture
- 11: Nanyo, Yamagata Prefecture
- 12: Sendai, Miyagi Prefecture
- 14: Oshu, Iwate Prefecture
- 15: Rikuzentakata, Iwate Prefecture
- 16: Hachinohe, Aomori Prefecture
- 18: Obihiro, Hokkaido Prefecture
- 19: Sapporo, Hokkaido Prefecture
- 21: Akita, Akita Prefecture. Takanohana is taken to hospital after suffering convulsions and falling unconscious while supervising a morning training session in the city. He is discharged the following day.
- 22: Tachikawa, Tokyo Prefecture
- 23: Mishima, Shizuoka Prefecture
- 24: Odawara, Kanagawa Prefecture
- 25: Kasukabe, Saitama Prefecture
- 26: KITTE exhibition, Tokyo Prefecture
- 27: The banzuke for the upcoming Aki basho is released. Tochinoshin is in danger of demotion in only his second ōzeki tournament. Mitakeumi is East Sekiwake, his 10th straight tournament in sanyaku. Kotoyuki returns to makuuchi for the first time since March, while Takanosho, a 23 year old from Chiganoura stable, makes his top division debut.

=== September ===
- 7: The matches for the first two days are announced, with all 70 sekitori expected to participate in the tournament. Kisenosato is paired against Ikioi on Day 1, who he has lost to only once in his career.
- 12: Day 4 sees three yokozuna all undefeated, the first time this has happened since the March 1989 tournament when Chiyonofuji, Hokutoumi and Onokuni were all 4–0.
- 22: Hakuhō marks his return from injury by defeating Goeidō to claim both his 41st championship and his 1000th win in the top division.
- 23: Hakuhō defeats Kakuryū (handing him his fifth straight loss in the tournament) to ensure a zensho-yusho, the 14th of his career. Kakuryū drops to 10–5, the same score as Kisenosato, who secures a majority of wins for the first time since his yokozuna debut in March 2017. Goeidō is the runner-up on 12–3, while his fellow ōzeki Takayasu and Tochinoshin finish on 11-4 and 9–6 respectively, the latter preserving his ōzeki status. There are no special prizes awarded for the first time since the sansho system was introduced in 1947. The jūryō championship is won by Tokushoryu who defeats Daiamami in a playoff after both wrestlers finish on 11–4. Ōrora, the heaviest sumo wrestler ever at 292 kg (644 lb), announces his retirement after 18 years in sumo.
- 25: Takanohana announces his resignation from the Japan Sumo Association stating that he was unable to comply with the organisation's demand that he retract the allegations made earlier in the year regarding the Takanoiwa case. Members of his stable are scheduled to move to Chiganoura.
- 25: The promotions to the jūryō division for the next tournament in Kyushu are announced. There are two newcomers: Gokushindo of the Nishikido stable and Oguruma stable's Tomokaze. Returning after two years in makushita is former sekiwake Toyonoshima.
- 27: Promotions for gyōji (referees) are announced, effective 25 December. The 11th Shikimori Kandayū (Hideki Imaoka) is elevated to the tate-gyōji rank and becomes the 41st gyōji to assume the name of Shikimori Inosuke. Kimura Kōnosuke (Toshiaki Kojima) is promoted to san'yaku-gyōji from makuuchi.
- 30:
  - Harumafuji's retirement ceremony (danpatsu-shiki) is held at the Kokugikan.
  - Onosho wins the All Japan Rikishi tournament, defeating Kisenosato in the final. Daishōho wins the juryo competition.

=== October ===
- 1: Takanohana stable is dissolved, and the Takanohana elder name disappears, upon Takanohana's official departure from the Sumo Association. The wrestler and personnel transfer to Chiganoura stable.
- The autumn tour visits the following locations:
  - 3: Ota-ku, Tokyo Prefecture
  - 4: Ota, Gunma Prefecture
  - 5: Ashikaga, Tochigi Prefecture
  - 6: Saitama, Saitama Prefecture
  - 7: Chiba, Chiba Prefecture
  - 8: Minamiashigara, Kanagawa Prefecture
  - 9: Higashiizu, Shizuoka Prefecture
  - 10: Kofu, Yamanashi Prefecture
  - 11: Kasugai, Aichi Prefecture
  - 12: Yokkaichi, Mie Prefecture
  - 13: Toyota, Aichi Prefecture
  - 14: Kanazawa, Ishikawa Prefecture
  - 16: Izumisano, Osaka Prefecture
  - 17: Kyoto, Kyoto Prefecture
  - 18: Ikeda, Osaka Prefecture
  - 19: Kurayoshi, Tottori Prefecture
  - 20: Sōja, Okayama Prefecture
  - 21: Takamatsu, Kagawa Prefecture
  - 23: Anan, Tokushima Prefecture
  - 24: Kochi, Kochi Prefecture
  - 25: Matsuyama, Ehime Prefecture
  - 26: Kure, Hiroshima Prefecture
  - 27: Hiroshima, Hiroshima Prefecture
  - 28: Shunan, Yamaguchi Prefecture
- 19: The panel set up in February in the wake of the Harumafuji assault presents its report to the Sumo Association and calls for mandatory reporting and disciplinary measures for acts of violence within stables.
- 19: The rankings for the Kyushu tournament next month are released. There are no newcomers to the top division but Daiamami, Meisei and Arawashi all return. Kaisei returns to the sanyaku ranks for the first time since September 2016. Veteran Gagamaru is demoted to the makushita division.

=== November ===
- 8: Hakuhō and Kakūryū both announce that they will miss the forthcoming November tournament through injury, meaning Kisenosato will be the sole yokozuna participating.
- 15: Kisenosato withdraws after losing his first four matches, reporting a right knee injury.
- 25: The tournament is won by komusubi Takakeisho, who defeats Nishikigi to finish with a 13–2 record. Ōzeki Takayasu fails to force a playoff after being defeated by Mitakeumi, and must settle for 12-3 and runner-up honours. It is Takakeisho's first top division championship in just his 26th career tournament, the 6th fastest since 1958 alongside Akebono. He is the third first-time yusho winner of the year, the most since 2000. He receives prizes for Outstanding Performance and Fighting Spirit. Ōnoshō also shares the Fighting Spirit prize after winning his tenth bout. Tochinoshin finishes on 8–7, which is enough to give him the most victories in makuuchi in 2018, with 59. (No wrestler managed a winning record in every tournament in the top division in 2018.) The juryo division championship is won by Tomokaze in his juryo debut with a 12–3 record, from the very bottom rank of #14 West. Veteran Sokokurai wins the makushita yusho. Former maegashira Satoyama retires at the age of 37 and becomes Sanoyama Oyakata.
- 28: The makushita division wrestler Shingaku retires after he was involved in a car accident on November 10 and charged with being under the influence of alcohol and failure to report an accident. His stablemaster Ōtake Oyakata is punished by the Sumo Association with a 20 percent salary cut for the next six months.

=== December ===
- The winter tour visits the following locations:
  - 2: Nagasaki, Nagasaki Prefecture
  - 3: Nogata, Fukuoka Prefecture
  - 4: Kurume, Fukuoka Prefecture
  - 5: Yukuhashi, Fukuoka Prefecture
  - 6: Beppu, Oita Prefecture
  - 7: Nobeoka, Miyazaki Prefecture
  - 8: Takamori, Kumamoto Prefecture
  - 9: Koshi, Kumamoto Prefecture
  - 10: Uto, Kumamoto Prefecture
  - 11: Hioki, Kagoshima Prefecture
  - 12: Kagoshima, Kagoshima Prefecture
  - 13: Kitakyushu, Fukuoka Prefecture
  - 15: Ginowan, Okinawa Prefecture
  - 16: Ginowan, Okinawa Prefecture
  - 20: Kumagaya, Saitama Prefecture
  - 21: Kawagoe, Saitama Prefecture
  - 22: Tsuchiura, Ibaraki Prefecture
- 5: Takanoiwa is suspended from the winter tour by the Sumo Association after he assaulted his tsukebito or personal attendant, reportedly because "he made an excuse for forgetting something." Takanoiwa was himself assaulted in October last year by now retired yokozuna Harumafuji. Shibatayama Oyakata comments, "Takanoiwa is supposed to understand the (pain) the most...We will take strict action over this incident."
- 7: Takanoiwa retires, submitting his letter of resignation to the Sumo Association, to take responsibility for the incident.
- 19: The Sumo Association holds a workshop for wrestlers to address the problem of violence in sumo, and announces that a yokozuna found to have committed violence against a subordinate will be expected to retire, while other sekitori will be suspended for a minimum of one tournament with the possibility of further penalties.

== Deaths ==
- 1 Jan: Former maegashira 1 Katsuhikari, also former Wakafuji Oyakata, aged 75, of cancer.
- 14 August: Former komusubi Itai, who made a number of match-fixing allegations in the 2000s, aged 62.
- 8 October: Former yokozuna Wajima, also former Hanakago Oyakata, aged 70, of throat cancer.

== See also ==
- Glossary of sumo terms
- List of active sumo wrestlers
- List of years in sumo
