= Mitakeumi Hisashi =

Japanese professional sumo wrestler

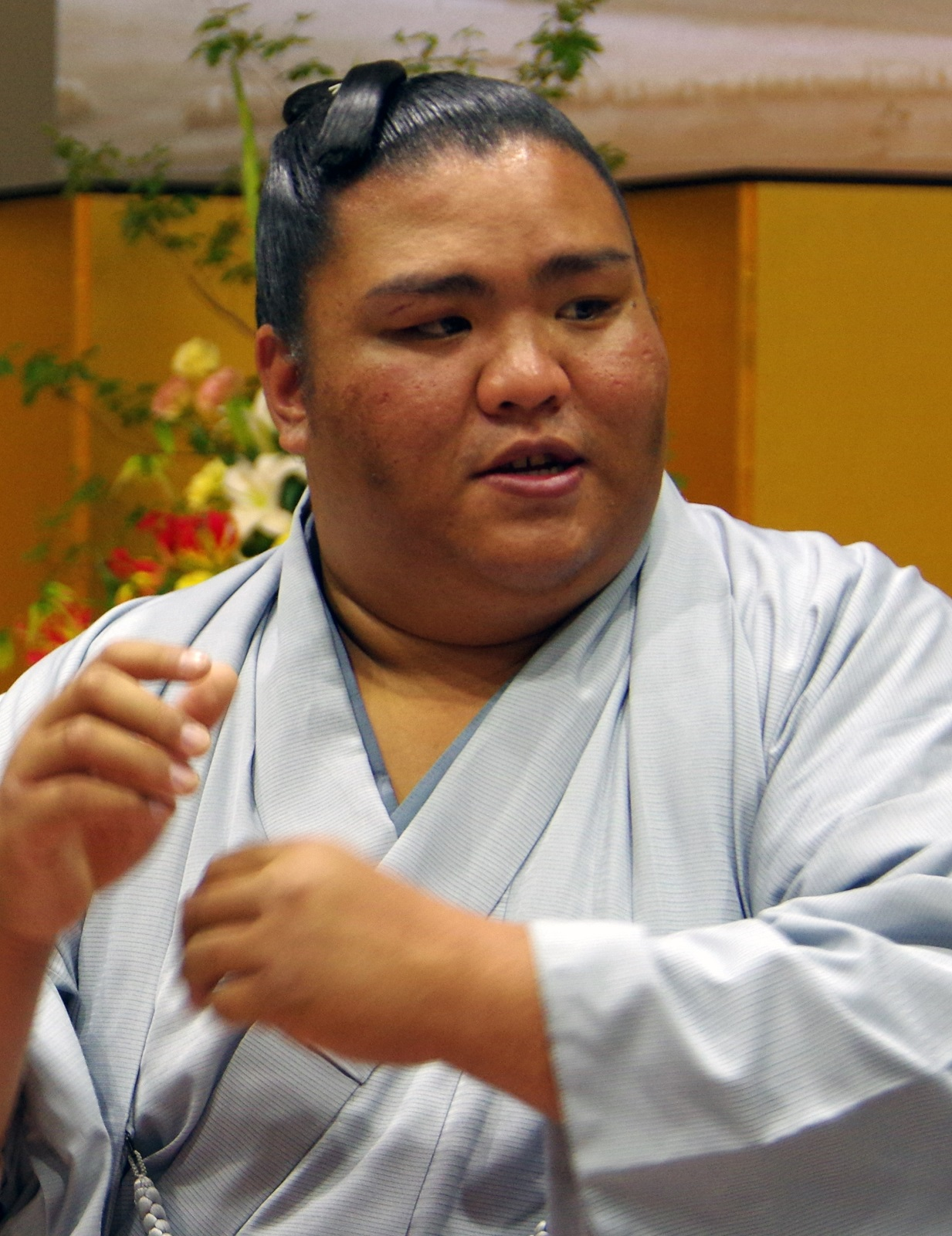
- Mitakeumi in 2018

Personal information
- Native name: 御嶽海 久司
- Born: Hisashi Ōmichi; December 25, 1992 (age 33) The Philippines
- Height: 1.82 m (5 ft 11 1/2 in)
- Weight: 175 kg (386 lb; 27.6 st)

Sport
- Sport: Sumo
- Rank: see below
- University team: Toyo University
- Heya: Dewanoumi
- Debut: March 2015
- Highest rank: Ōzeki (March 2022)
- Championships: 3 Makuuchi; 1 Jūryō
- Special Prizes: Fighting Spirit (1); Technique (3); Outstanding Performance (6)
- Gold Stars: 2 Harumafuji; Kakuryū
- Updated on 24 September 2023

Mitakeumi Hisashi (Japanese: 御嶽海 久司; born December 25, 1992 as Hisashi Omichi (大道 久司, Ōmichi Hisashi)) is a Japanese professional sumo wrestler from Agematsu, Nagano. He is in the Dewanoumi stable. He is a pusher thruster-type wrestler. A former amateur champion at Toyo University, he made his professional debut in March 2015, reaching the top makuuchi division in November of the same year. He has ten special prizes for Fighting Spirit, Technique and Outstanding Performance, as well two gold stars for defeating a yokozuna while ranked as a maegashira. His highest rank has been ōzeki. He won his first top division championship (yūshō) in July 2018, his second in September 2019, and his third in January 2022. All three yūshō were won at the rank of sekiwake.

== Early life and sumo background ==
Mitakeumi was born as Hisashi Ōmichi on 25 December 1992 to Haruo Ōmichi, a Japanese, and Margarita, who is originally from the Philippines. His mother first came to Japan as a member of an all-female band, and after giving birth to Hisashi in the Philippines, she returned with him to Japan. Hisashi began in sumo at Agematsu Elementary school as a first grader at a sumo tournament in Ōkuwa where he lost to an opponent smaller than himself. This loss lit a fire in his soul, which led to him formally beginning in sumo by joining the Kiso Sumo Club for boys. By the end of elementary school he rose to second place in the All Japan Elementary School Sumo Championship Tournament. While attending Kiso Fukushima Middle School he was in the Top 8 amongst his peers nationally. In his third year at Kiso Seihō High School he earned third place in the National Sports Festival junior sumo competition. He then went on to Law School at Toyo University.

At Toyo University he became a powerful pusher thruster and earned 15 titles in sumo. In his fourth year at university in November he became a university yokozuna, then went on to become an amateur yokozuna in December. Attaining both university yokozuna and amateur yokozuna earned him the right to start as a professional at the rank of makushita 10. He had initially not intended to enter the professional ranks, but instead to work for the Wakayama Prefectural government. However he was convinced by the former Oginohana, the 11th generation stable master at Dewanoumi stable to help revive the fortunes of his stable, and so joined the stable on February 12, 2015. He became the first new student of the stablemaster, who had just taken over from his predecessor (former sekiwake Washūyama).

== Career ==
=== Early career ===
He entered the dohyō for the first time in the March 2015 tournament and was given the name Mitakeumi. His name is taken from a mountain near his hometown of Agematsu named Mount Ontake (御嶽山. 御 can be read as "On" or "Mi"). The "Umi" part of his name comes from his stable, Dewanoumi. Although Mitakeumi suffered his first loss as a professional sumo wrestler to Daishōhō in his second bout of the tournament, this helped relieve tension, and he was able to finish with a strong 6-1 winning record. This propelled him to the rank of east makushita #3 in the next tournament where he got another 6–1 record and advanced to the second highest (jūryō) division of sumo in the July tournament. He became only the 11th wrestler promoted to jūryō after only two tournaments.

In his first jūryō tournament Mitakeumi earned the championship with an 11–4 record at the July 2015 tournament. It had been 66 years since the May 1949 tournament that a wrestler from Nagano had won the jūryō tournament. On day 10 of the tournament he suffered a loss as well as a sharp blow to the mouth from Jōkōryū requiring 15 stitches to his upper lip, however he was able to return the following day and earn a victory.

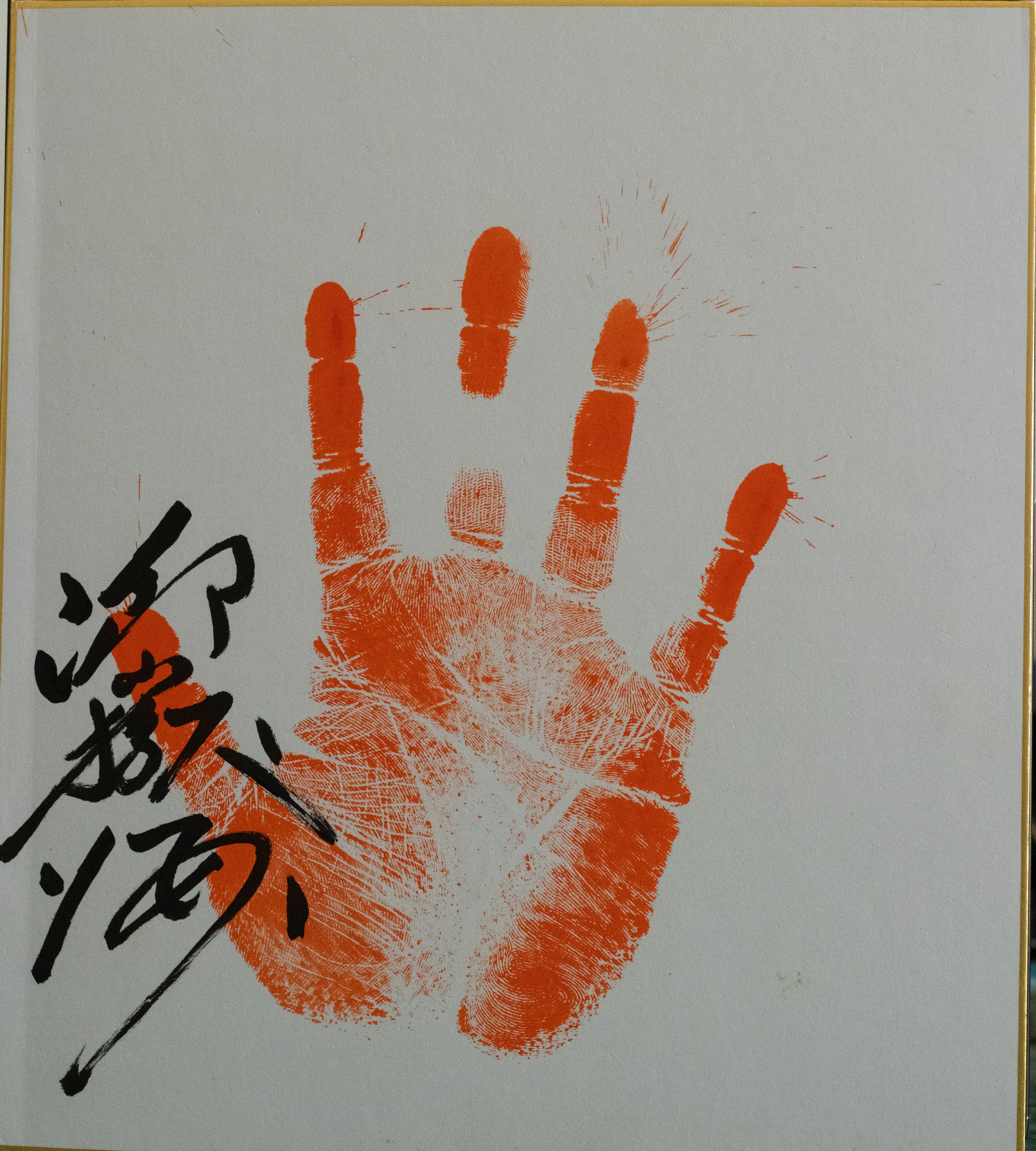
Mitakeumi original tegata (handprint & signature)

=== Promotion to makuuchi ===
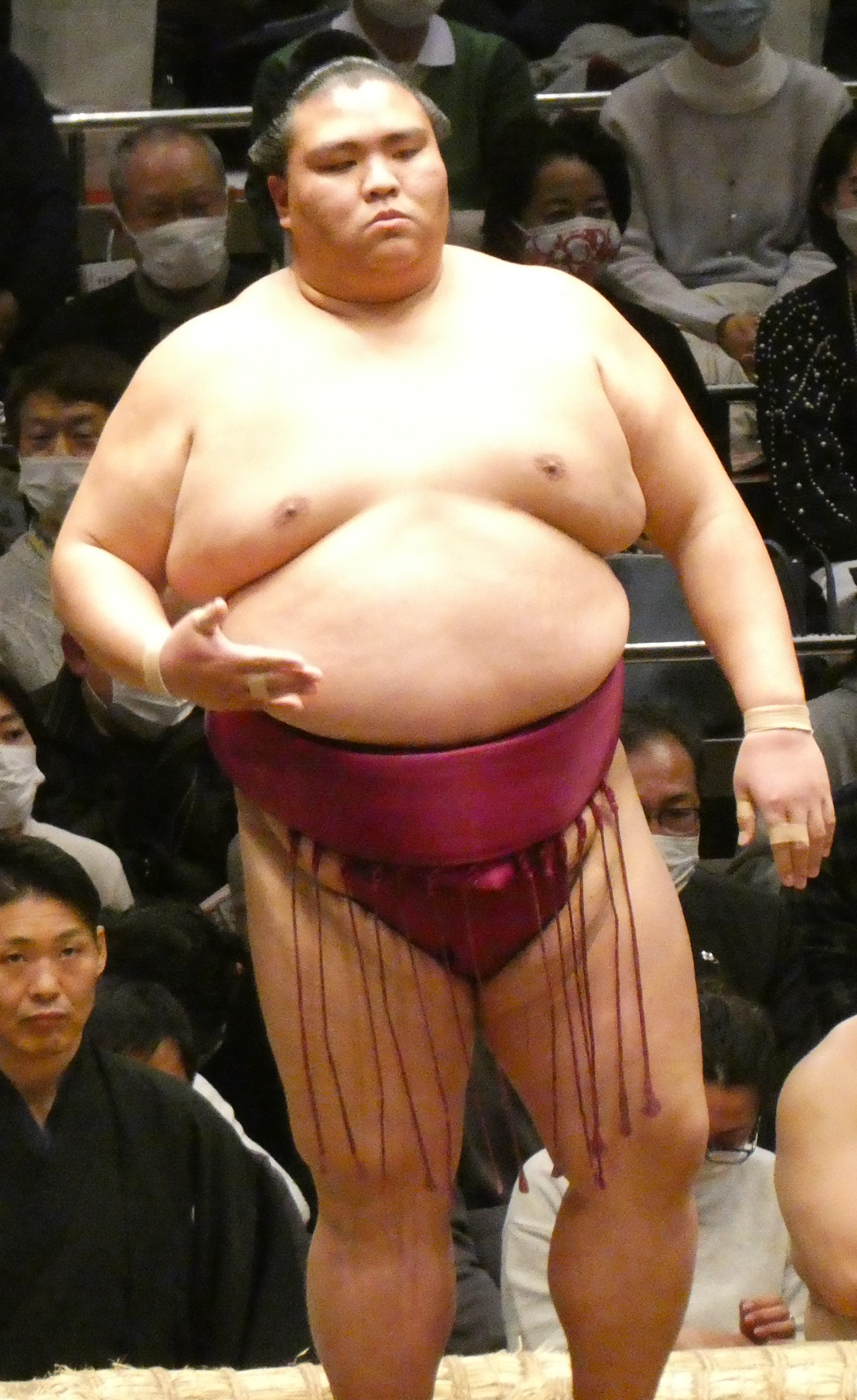
Mitakeumi in 2022

Mitakeumi fought for the first time in the makuuchi division while in jūryō on Day 14 of the September 2015 tournament. He finished with a 12–3 record at the rank of jūryō #5 at this tournament and was promoted to the makuuchi division for the November tournament in Kyushu. He became the first wrestler to enter the top (makuuchi) division from Nagano prefecture since Ōwashi retired from sumo in January 1978 (this period of 37 years was the current longest amongst all the prefectures). It had also been 47 years since a wrestler from Nagano reached the rank of jūryō (Ōwashi in 1968).

He earned an 8–7 winning record on his top division debut. He had the flu during the January 2016 tournament, which contributed to his first losing record in the top division, however he followed this tournament with two strong performances of 10–5 and 11–4, taking his first special prize, the fighting spirit prize, in May 2016. He made his san'yaku debut at komusubi in the November 2016 tournament. The new rank though proved to be a challenge as he had to face everyone above him in the first week losing 7 of the first 8 days. In the end he only managed to get 6 wins, going 6-9 overall. 2016 proved overall to be a good year for Mitakeumi having three tournaments with double digit wins, winning his first prize, and making it to komusubi, and he was the 53rd winner of the annual "best makuuchi newcomer" award sponsored by ChuSpo.

=== Promotion to sekiwake ===
Mitakeumi began the Hatsu tournament in January 2017 with a win over ōzeki Gōeidō, and on Day 2 he earned his first kinboshi (a yokozuna upset by a wrestler from the maegashira ranks) when he defeated Harumafuji. He also defeated yokozuna Kakuryū on Day 4. He finished with 11 wins and was awarded a Technique prize for his performance in this tournament. He returned to the sanyaku ranks in the March 2017 tournament at komusubi, and came through with a winning record of 9–6. In May he defeated Kakuryū on Day 1 and Harumafuji on Day 11 (which was Harumafuji's first loss in the tournament). He finished with an 8–7 record and received the Outstanding Performance Award for the first time. He was promoted to sekiwake for the July 2017 tournament, the first wrestler from Dewanoumi stable to achieve this since Dewanohana in 1982. In this tournament he defeated yokozuna Kisenosato on opening day, and tournament leader Hakuhō on Day 11, who was on a 25-match winning streak and hoping to equal the all-time career wins record of 1047. Mitakeumi's only previous win over Hakuhō had been by default when the yokozuna pulled out of the March 2017 tournament through injury. He ended the tournament with a 9–6 record and received a second consecutive Outstanding Performance award. In an interview immediately after the tournament he commented "I didn't think I would be able to win this award twice in a row so I am pleased. It was good that I was able to wrestle my brand of sumo at this tournament, win on the last day and also get a victory against Hakuho". Mitakeumi maintained his sekiwake rank in the September and November tournaments, and was the only top division wrestler to secure a majority of wins against losses in every tournament of 2017. In January 2018 he started well with seven straight wins but he recorded only one more win (over Kakuryū) in the tournament. A 7–8 result in March saw him demoted to komusubi but he rebounded with 9 wins in May to return to sekiwake.

=== First tournament win ===
The 2018 Nagoya tournament in July saw many injury withdrawals (kyūjō): Kisenosato did not start the tournament, and by day 6 he had been joined on the injured list by Hakuhō, Kakuryū and the newly promoted ōzeki Tochinoshin. Mitakeumi won his first eleven matches and appeared to have extended his run against the ōzeki Takayasu on day 12 but the referee's decision was overturned by the judges. After a win over the ōzeki Gōeidō the following afternoon he clinched the title on day 14 with a yorikiri victory over Tochiōzan. Interviewed immediately after the match he had difficulty responding to questions as he struggled to control his emotions and repeatedly broke down in tears. He became the first wrestler from the Dewanoumi stable to win a top-division title in since Mienoumi in 1980. Despite losing to Yutakayama in his final match he was awarded the Emperor's Cup as champion as well as the special prizes for technique and outstanding performance. Addressing the crowd after the presentation of the trophies he said "It's simply awesome. I've never spoken in front of such a big crowd. I probably won't remember what I said here. I wanted to end on a good note with a win, but I think I still need to get stronger. I wasn't able to push my opponent out, so I think I'll have to go back and practice." He received plenty of local support as the Nagoya tournament is held close to his hometown of Agematsu.

Despite speculation that Mitakeumi could be promoted to ōzeki with another good performance in September, he lost five bouts in a row from Days 8 to 12, and ended with only a 9–6 record. He lost his sekiwake rank after a make-koshi 7–8 record in November, but began the January 2019 tournament with five straight wins before injuring his knee in a Day 6 defeat to Myōgiryū. Forced to sit out Days 7 to 10 due to the injury, he returned on Day 11 and defeated Hakuhō, handing the yokozuna his first loss of the tournament. He finished the tournament with eight wins and was awarded the Outstanding Performance Award for defeating both two yokozuna as well as the tournament winner Tamawashi. He became the first wrestler since special prizes were established in 1947 to win one despite missing some bouts through injury. Despite a 7-8 performance in March he retained his komusubi status and secured a return to sekiwake with nine wins in May. Another nine wins in July meant that he entered the next tournament in san'yaku for the 16th consecutive time.

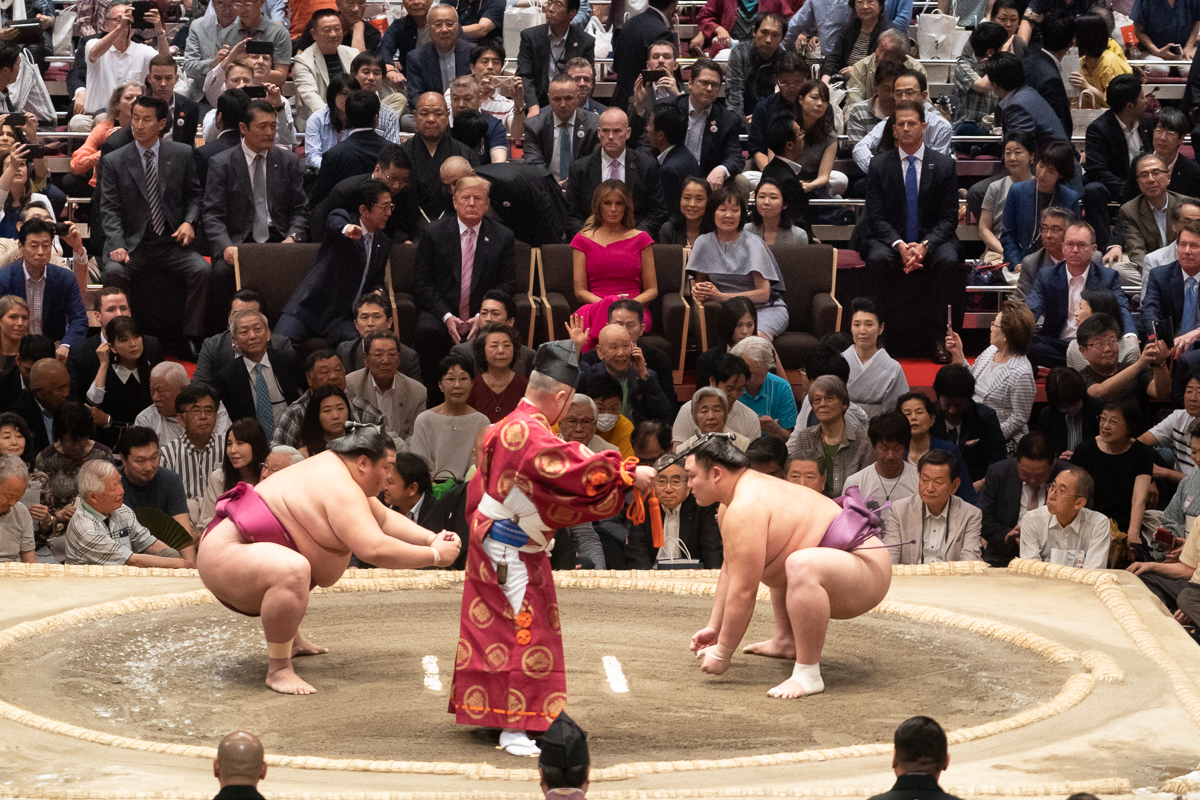
Mitakeumi faces off against Asanoyama on the final day of the May 2019 tournament.

=== Second championship ===
The 2019 September tournament saw the upper ranks depleted as the ōzeki Takayasu sat out the tournament while the two active yokozuna, Hakuhō and Kakuryū withdrew by the end of the first week. After losing to Asanoyama in his first match Mitakeumi won his next six bouts before losing tamely to Takakeishō on day 8. He remained in contention throughout the second week despite a loss to Ryūden on day 11 and a victory over Gōeidō on day 14 (in which he employed a henka) saw him enter the final day in a three-way tie for the lead alongside Okinoumi and Takakeishō. After Takakeishō defeated Okinoumi, Mitakeumi secured his place in a play-off for the title with a yorikiri win over Endō. In the play-off Mitakeumi evaded Takakeishō's attempt at a pull-down, secured a double inside grip and quickly forced his rival over the bales to win his second top division championship and the Outstanding Performance Award as well.

Mitakeumi needed a strong performance and record in the November 2019 basho to secure a promotion to ōzeki. On Day 3, he badly injured his right eye in his win over Meisei. Mitakeumi never recovered after that, finishing with a losing record of 6–9 and eliminating all chances for a promotion. Instead, he was demoted from sekiwake all the way down to West maegashira #2 for the January 2020 basho. This was his first time in the maegashira ranks since January 2017. In the March 2020 basho he posted 10 wins, securing his promotion to sekiwake for the July 2020 basho, where he posted 11 wins and defeated Asanoyama and Hakuhō. He was awarded his sixth Outstanding Performance prize. This performance saw him on another ōzeki run, but he posted only 8–7 in the following tournament in September. In November 2020 he produced a make-koshi record of 7-8 and fell to komusubi for the January 2021 tournament. He went on to secure a winning record in every tournament in 2021, and finished the year with an 11–4 record.

=== Third championship and ōzeki career ===
Fighting at the rank of sekiwake at the January 2022 tournament, Mitakeumi won his third top-division yūshō with a 13–2 record. Mitakeumi defeated yokozuna Terunofuji on the final day to secure the championship. He said afterwards, "I was worried at one point about whether I could hold up mentally, but I was able to take the pressure." Having won 33 matches in the last three tournaments which includes one yūshō, Mitakeumi met the de facto requirement to be promoted to ōzeki, and a meeting was scheduled to discuss the promotion. The promotion was finalized on 26 January 2022. In his customary acceptance speech, Mitakeumi said he would embrace gratitude, express his own style and devote himself to the way of sumo.

Mitakeumi is the first ōzeki from Nagano prefecture in 227 years, since Raiden Tameemon. Prior to his promotion Mitakeumi said, "I'm really happy that even people unfamiliar with sumo will hear the name Raiden."

The Sumo Association announced that Mitakeumi tested positive for COVID-19 on January 31. The test was announced after he had participated in the danpatsu-shiki of Gōeidō during the previous two days. In his ōzeki debut in March 2022, Mitakeumi produced an 11–4 record, and was ranked in the top Ōzeki 1 East slot for the May 2022 tournament.

Mitakeumi was forced to withdraw on Day 7 of the July 2022 basho after another member of his stable tested positive for COVID-19. Later the same day, it was announced that Mitakeumi himself tested positive for the virus. As he had already been in kadoban status but withdrew before a winning or losing record could be determined, the Sumo Association decided to extend his kadoban status to the following tournament in September.

Mitakeumi's losing record in the September tournament resulted his demotion to sekiwake. At a total of four basho, his reign as an ōzeki is one of the shortest since 1941, and the shortest since Takakeishō's first ōzeki stint in 2019. He could have made an immediate return to ōzeki had he secured at least ten wins in the November 2022 tournament, but this became impossible with his sixth defeat on Day 10.

=== Post-ōzeki career ===
For the January 2023 tournament Mitakeumi was ranked maegashira 2, marking the first time he had been placed outside the upper rankings since 2020. He finished the tournament with a losing 7–8 record. Following a good May tournament, Mitakeumi was promoted to maegashira 2 for the July tournament of the same year.

Prior to this tournament, however, Mitakeumi learned of his father's death, forcing him to travel from Inuyama (Dewanoumi's training camp) to Kiso (Nagano Prefecture) to attend the funeral at his parents' home. His master Dewanoumi-oyakata commented, however, that Mitakeumi still wished to take part in the tournament, which began 3 days later. In fact, Mitakeumi resumed training on the evening of the 7th. Commenting on his father's death, he admitted that his parents had hidden from him his father's hospitalisation for acute heart failure. Moreover, by his own admission he was having sleepless nights during the funeral ceremony, but vowed to perform well in his father's memory. After scoring a low result in the tournament, Mitakeumi confessed to Chunichi Sports that he had also lost his maternal grandmother during the tournament. In the same interview he confided that he had apologized to his father's grave for having been "pitiful" during the tournament, vowing to return to the san'yaku ranks by the end of the year by winning the September tournament. Relegated to Maegashira 11, his lowest ranking since the March 2016 tournament, Mitakeumi competed in matches at the very start of his division, these usually serving as build-ups for the higher-ranked wrestlers. For the first time in seven and a half years, he was one of two wrestlers to open the makuuchi matches of a tournament day, nonetheless earning an eighth victory over Sadanoumi, guaranteeing promotion in makuuchi.

At the May 2024 tournament, Mitakeumi established himself as one of the tournament leaders, recording five consecutive wins from the first day of the competition. However, his winning streak came to an end when he was defeated by fellow leader Ura. On Day 8, he maintained his place one win behind the leading group with a victory over Shōnannoumi, both opponents falling from the dohyō at the end of the match and Mitakeumi showing signs of being unable to close his left knee. He gave up a share of the lead on Day 10, and finished the tournament with eight wins.

Mitakeumi was unable to secure a winning record in each of the next five tournaments. In May 2025 he was demoted to jūryō–his first time ranked outside of the top division since he was promoted to it in November 2015. After regaining his makuuchi status for the July 2025 tournament, Mitakeumi continued to compete at this level after being promoted to maegashira 12 for the September tournament. Two days before the start of the tournament, Mitakeumi learned of the death of his mother at the age of 55, following a sudden illness. Returning to Agematsu to mourn, Mitakeumi conveyed through his master Dewanoumi his wish to still participate in the September tournament.

== Fighting style ==
Mitakeumi prefers pushing and thrusting moves as opposed to fighting on the opponent's mawashi or belt. His most common winning techniques are oshidashi, the push out, yorikiri, the force out and hatakikomi, the slap down. Mitakeumi emphasizes speed in his tachi-ai, and attempts to be the first wrestler in each match to take two steps toward his opponent rather than one. He trains by unconventional methods, such as jumping rope and running uphill, to gain additional speed.

== Personal life ==
At the time that Mitakeumi was promoted to the rank of ōzeki in January 2022, stablemaster Dewanoumi (former maegashira Oginohana) revealed that Mitakeumi was married to a woman a year older. The reception took place in a Tokyo hotel on 12 February 2024, with around 500 people in attendance.

== Career record ==
Mitakeumi Hisashi
Year	January Hatsu basho, Tokyo	March Haru basho, Osaka	May Natsu basho, Tokyo	July Nagoya basho, Nagoya	September Aki basho, Tokyo	November Kyūshū basho, Fukuoka
2015	x	Makushita tsukedashi #10; 6–1	East Makushita #3; 6–1	West Jūryō #12; 11–4; Champion	West Jūryō #5; 12–3	West Maegashira #11; 8–7
2016	West Maegashira #10; 5–8–2	West Maegashira #13; 10–5	West Maegashira #8; 11–4; F	East Maegashira #1; 5–10	West Maegashira #5; 10–5	East Komusubi #1; 6–9
2017	West Maegashira #1; 11–4; T★★	East Komusubi #1; 9–6	East Komusubi #1; 8–7; O	West Sekiwake #1; 9–6; O	East Sekiwake #1; 8–7	East Sekiwake #1; 9–6
2018	East Sekiwake #1; 8–7	East Sekiwake #1; 7–8	East Komusubi #1; 9–6	West Sekiwake #1; 13–2; OT	East Sekiwake #1; 9–6	East Sekiwake #1; 7–8
2019	West Komusubi #1; 8–4–3; O	East Komusubi #1; 7–8	West Komusubi #1; 9–6	East Sekiwake #1; 9–6	East Sekiwake #1; 12–3–P; O	East Sekiwake #1; 6–9
2020	West Maegashira #2; 7–8	West Maegashira #3; 10–5	West Sekiwake #1; Tournament Cancelled; State of Emergency; 0–0–0	West Sekiwake #1; 11–4; O	West Sekiwake #1; 8–7	East Sekiwake #1; 7–8
2021	West Komusubi #1; 9–6	West Komusubi #1; 8–7	East Komusubi #1; 10–5	West Sekiwake #1; 8–7	East Sekiwake #1; 9–6	East Sekiwake #1; 11–4
2022	East Sekiwake #1; 13–2; T	West Ōzeki #2; 11–4	East Ōzeki #1; 6–9	West Ōzeki #1; 2–5–8 (Note: Withdrew on Day 7 due to COVID protocols. His ōzeki rank and its kadoban status were extended to the following tournament.)	West Ōzeki #2; 4–11	West Sekiwake #2; 6–9
2023	East Maegashira #2; 7–8	East Maegashira #3; 4–11	West Maegashira #6; 9–6	West Maegashira #2; 3–12	East Maegashira #11; 9–6	West Maegashira #9; 8–7
2024	East Maegashira #9; 6–9	West Maegashira #10; 9–6	West Maegashira #7; 8–7	West Maegashira #2; 7–8	East Maegashira #3; 4–11	West Maegashira #7; 7–8
2025	West Maegashira #7; 2–13	East Maegashira #17; 6–9	East Jūryō #1; 8–7	West Maegashira #16; 10–5	West Maegashira #12; 7–8	West Maegashira #13; 7–8
2026	West Maegashira #14; 7–8	West Maegashira #15; 8–7	East Maegashira #14; 8–7	West Maegashira #11; 2–13	West Jūryō #4; 5–10	East Jūryō #9; 6–9
Record given as wins–losses–absences Top division champion Top division runner-up Retired Non-participation Jūryō Lower divisions Sanshō key: F=Fighting spirit; O=Outstanding performance; T=Technique Also shown: ★=Kinboshi; P=Playoff(s); Divisions: Makuuchi — Jūryō — Makushita — Sandanme — Jonidan — Jonokuchi Makuuchi ranks: Yokozuna — Ōzeki — Sekiwake — Komusubi — Maegashira

== See also ==
- Glossary of sumo terms
- List of active sumo wrestlers
- List of non-Japanese sumo wrestlers
- List of active gold star earners
- List of active special prize winners
- List of sumo record holders
- List of sumo top division champions
- List of sumo second division champions
- List of ōzeki
