= Kyokutaisei Takuya =

Japanese sumo wrestler

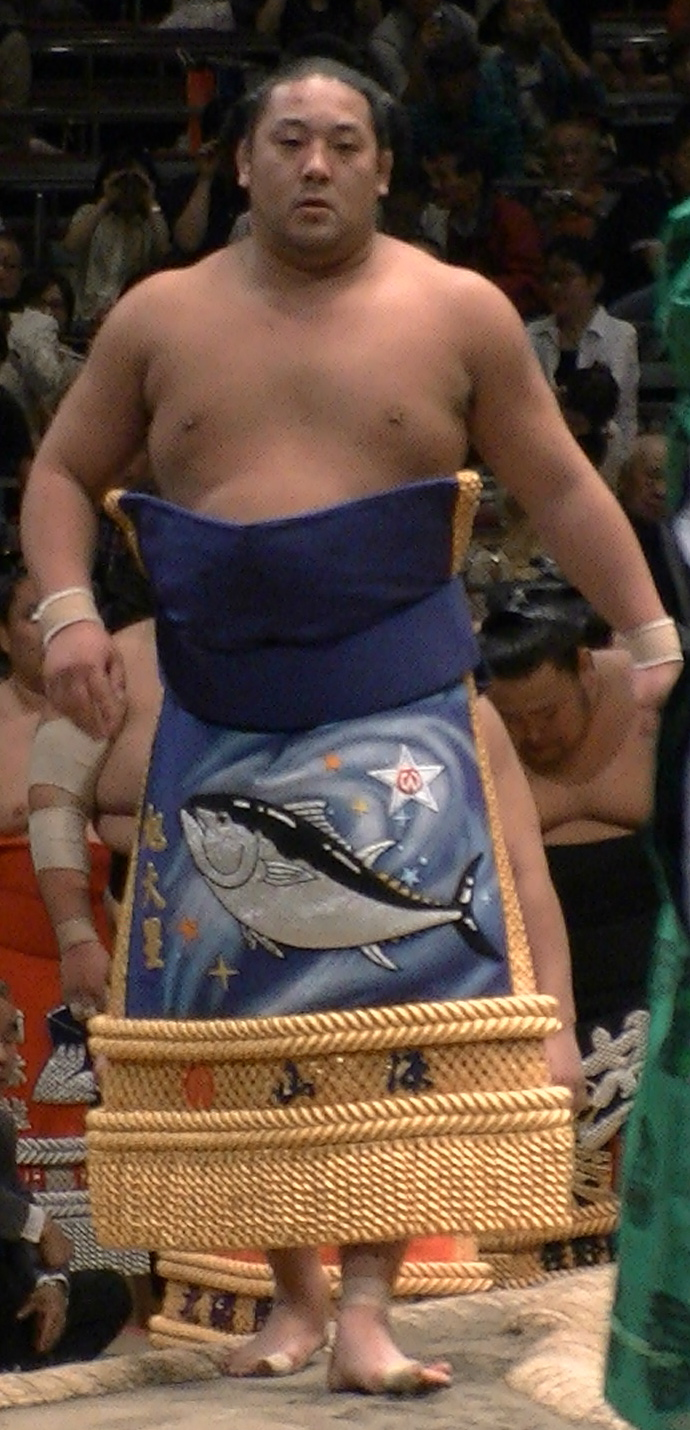
- Kyokutaisei in 2014

Personal information
- Native name: 旭大星 託也
- Born: Takuya Ōgushi; 18 October 1989 (age 36) Asahikawa, Hokkaido
- Height: 1.85 m (6 ft 1 in)
- Weight: 145.3 kg (320 lb; 22.88 st)

Sport
- Sport: Sumo
- Retired: December 2024
- Heya: Ōshima → Tomozuna → Ōshima
- Record: 483-434-80
- Debut: January 2008
- Highest rank: Maegashira 8 (July 2018)
- Special Prizes: 1 (Fighting Spirit)
- Updated on 26 December 2024

Kyokutaisei Takuya (Japanese: 旭大星 託也; born 18 October 1989 as Takuya Ōgushi (大串 拓也, Ōgushi Takuya)) is a Japanese former professional sumo wrestler from Asahikawa, Hokkaido. His debut in maezumō was in January 2008, and his first makuuchi division honbasho was the Natsu tournament in May 2018. His highest rank has been maegashira 8. He has one special prize for Fighting Spirit. He was a member of Ōshima stable and retired in December 2024.

== Career ==
=== Early career ===
He was originally a judo practitioner, but was strongly encouraged by his father and sponsors from his hometown of Asahikawa to join sumo which he initially rejected. When asked again by his father after he finished high school, he agreed. He was then accepted to Ōshima stable by Ōshima-oyakata. He was light entering sumo at 83 kg so to add weight he would eat as much and as often as he could even waking up in the middle of the night for snacks to add on the calories. Because of him being so light his oyakata would tell him to imitate Ama later known as Harumafuji who also was a light wrestler. Early on he disliked sumo citing homesickness and the hard life style, he even ran away in the middle of the night to live with one of his friends to get away from sumo. This didn't last long though as he was talked into going back to the stable in time for the next tournament. He was the star of a French documentary, Tu Seras Sumo, or A Normal Life: Chronicle of a Sumo Wrestler, released in 2013, which covered the first nine months of his sumo career in 2008. In July 2014 he made the sekitori ranks for the first time when he was promoted to the jūryō division, but he was demoted back to makushita after only two tournaments. He returned to jūryō in September 2015.

=== Makuuchi and later career ===
His first makuuchi division honbasho was the Natsu tournament in May 2018 which he debuted at maegashira 15. He was the first top division wrestler from Hokkaidō since the demotion of Kitakachidoki exactly 20 years earlier, in May 1998, and the first Hokkaidō native to win promotion to makuuchi since Tatsuhikari in January 1992. In his debut tournament he went 10–5 and was awarded the fighting spirit prize for his efforts, this is his first sanshō (special prize). He was promoted to his highest rank to date of maegashira 8 for the July 2018 tournament, where he scored a make-koshi 6–9. He withdrew from a tournament for the first time in his career in September, after injuring his knees in his Day 3 bout against Daieishō. He returned to the tournament on Day 9, but withdrew again on Day 11 after aggravating the injury. He was demoted to the jūryō division in November 2018 and did not manage to return to makuuchi until almost two years later in September 2020. He withdrew on Day 5 of the September tournament with an Achilles' tendon injury, resulting in demotion back to the second division.

He was forced to sit out the January 2021 tournament due to a wrestler at Tomozuna stable tested positive for COVID-19. He withdrew from the September 2021 tournament after suffering ligament damage in his left knee, and lost sekitori status after the November 2021 tournament when he could score only 2–13 at the rank of jūryō 9. He withdrew from both the January and March 2022 tournaments partway through after suffering injuries. After having surgery on his knee and sitting out three straight tournaments from May to September 2022, Kyokutaisei finally returned to competitive action in the November 2022 tournament, having fallen to jonokuchi 5 in the rankings. On Day 8 he defeated Takabahō to move to 4–0, his first kachi-koshi since March 2021, when he was ranked in jūryō. During this tournament he also recorded a fifth win in a row, but missed out on the championship after being defeated on Day 11 by Takerufuji.

Having begun his career at Ōshima stable, he was once again a member of Ōshima after February 2022 when his stablemaster renamed it from Tomozuna stable.

Impeded by his left knee injury, Kyokutaisei retired in December 2024, without staying with the association as an elder. A few days after announcing his retirement, he told the Nikkan Sports newspaper of his intention to run an aburasoba restaurant, wishing first to train in a restaurant to which he is indebted to the owner. His retirement ceremony was held in a Tokyo hotel on 1 June 2025.

== Fighting style ==
Kyokutaisei was unusual in that he preferred a maemitsu grip on his opponent's mawashi or belt – grabbing the front part directly below the stomach area. His most common winning techniques were oshidashi (frontal push out) and hatakikomi (slap down), which were responsible for over 60% of his victories. He was also fond of dashinage techniques which involved throwing the opponent in a pulling motion, such as shitatedashinage (pulling underarm throw).

== Personal ==
Kyokutaisei registered his marriage to Yoshie Kobayashi on 18 September 2017. The reception was held on 9 June 2018, about 450 guests attended with Hakuhō giving a speech.

== Career record ==
Kyokutaisei Takuya
Year	January Hatsu basho, Tokyo	March Haru basho, Osaka	May Natsu basho, Tokyo	July Nagoya basho, Nagoya	September Aki basho, Tokyo	November Kyūshū basho, Fukuoka
2008	(Maezumo)	East Jonokuchi #28; 6–1	East Jonidan #61; 5–2	East Jonidan #22; 2–5	East Jonidan #57; 4–3	West Jonidan #29; 3–4
2009	East Jonidan #54; 3–4	East Jonidan #78; 4–3	West Jonidan #51; 5–2	West Jonidan #7; 5–2	East Sandanme #78; 3–4	East Sandanme #92; 4–3
2010	West Sandanme #74; 5–2	West Sandanme #42; 3–4	West Sandanme #57; 4–3	East Sandanme #43; 6–1	West Makushita #54; 1–6	East Sandanme #24; 3–4
2011	West Sandanme #41; 4–3	West Sandanme #27; Tournament Cancelled; Match fixing investigation 0–0–0	West Sandanme #27; 5–2	West Makushita #55; 2–5	West Sandanme #17; 4–3	West Sandanme #4; 5–2
2012	East Makushita #51; 4–3	East Makushita #44; 4–3	West Makushita #36; 3–4	East Makushita #48; 4–3	West Makushita #40; 4–3	East Makushita #32; 3–4
2013	East Makushita #39; 5–2	West Makushita #23; 4–3	East Makushita #15; 3–4	East Makushita #24; 6–1	West Makushita #11; 3–4	West Makushita #16; 3–4
2014	East Makushita #23; 5–2	East Makushita #11; 6–1	West Makushita #3; 5–2	West Jūryō #13; 7–8	East Jūryō #14; 5–10	East Makushita #5; 3–4
2015	East Makushita #10; 4–3	East Makushita #7; 4–3	East Makushita #6; 5–2	East Makushita #4; 5–2	West Jūryō #13; 9–6	West Jūryō #7; 6–9
2016	West Jūryō #9; 5–10	West Jūryō #14; 6–9	West Makushita #2; 5–2	East Jūryō #13; 7–8	East Jūryō #13; 8–7	East Jūryō #11; 10–5
2017	East Jūryō #7; 8–7	West Jūryō #6; 9–6	West Jūryō #3; 6–9	East Jūryō #6; 8–7	East Jūryō #4; 6–9	East Jūryō #6; 9–6
2018	West Jūryō #1; 8–7	East Jūryō #1; 8–7	West Maegashira #15; 10–5; F	West Maegashira #8; 6–9	West Maegashira #11; 1–6–8	East Jūryō #7; 7–8
2019	East Jūryō #9; 7–8	East Jūryō #9; 8–7	East Jūryō #8; 6–9	East Jūryō #11; 8–7	West Jūryō #9; 9–6	East Jūryō #7; 7–8
2020	East Jūryō #8; 7–8	East Jūryō #8; 9–6	East Jūryō #5; Tournament Cancelled; State of Emergency; 0–0–0	East Jūryō #5; 10–5–P	East Maegashira #16; 2–3–10	East Jūryō #8; 8–7
2021	East Jūryō #7; Sat out due to COVID rules 0–0–15	East Jūryō #8; 7–8	West Jūryō #8; 9–6	East Jūryō #2; 7–7–1	West Jūryō #2; 2–4–9	West Jūryō #9; 2–13
2022	West Makushita #5; 0–3–4	West Makushita #38; 1–1–5	East Sandanme #6; Sat out due to injury 0–0–7	West Sandanme #66; Sat out due to injury 0–0–7	East Jonidan #37; Sat out due to injury 0–0–7	West Jonokuchi #5; 6–1
2023	East Jonidan #28; 6–1	West Sandanme #55; 6–1	East Sandanme #3; 4–3	East Makushita #53; 4–3	West Makushita #44; 4–3	West Makushita #35; 3–4
2024	West Makushita #45; 3–4	West Makushita #55; 6–1	East Makushita #25; 4–3	East Makushita #19; 3–4	East Makushita #26; 2–5	East Makushita #40; Sat out due to injury 0–0–7
2025	West Sandanme #20; Retired –	x	x	x	x	x
Record given as wins–losses–absences Top division champion Top division runner-up Retired Lower divisions Non-participation Sanshō key: F=Fighting spirit; O=Outstanding performance; T=Technique Also shown: ★=Kinboshi; P=Playoff(s); Divisions: Makuuchi — Jūryō — Makushita — Sandanme — Jonidan — Jonokuchi Makuuchi ranks: Yokozuna — Ōzeki — Sekiwake — Komusubi — Maegashira

== See also ==
- Glossary of sumo terms
- List of past sumo wrestlers
