= Chiyonokuni Toshiki =

Japanese sumo wrestler

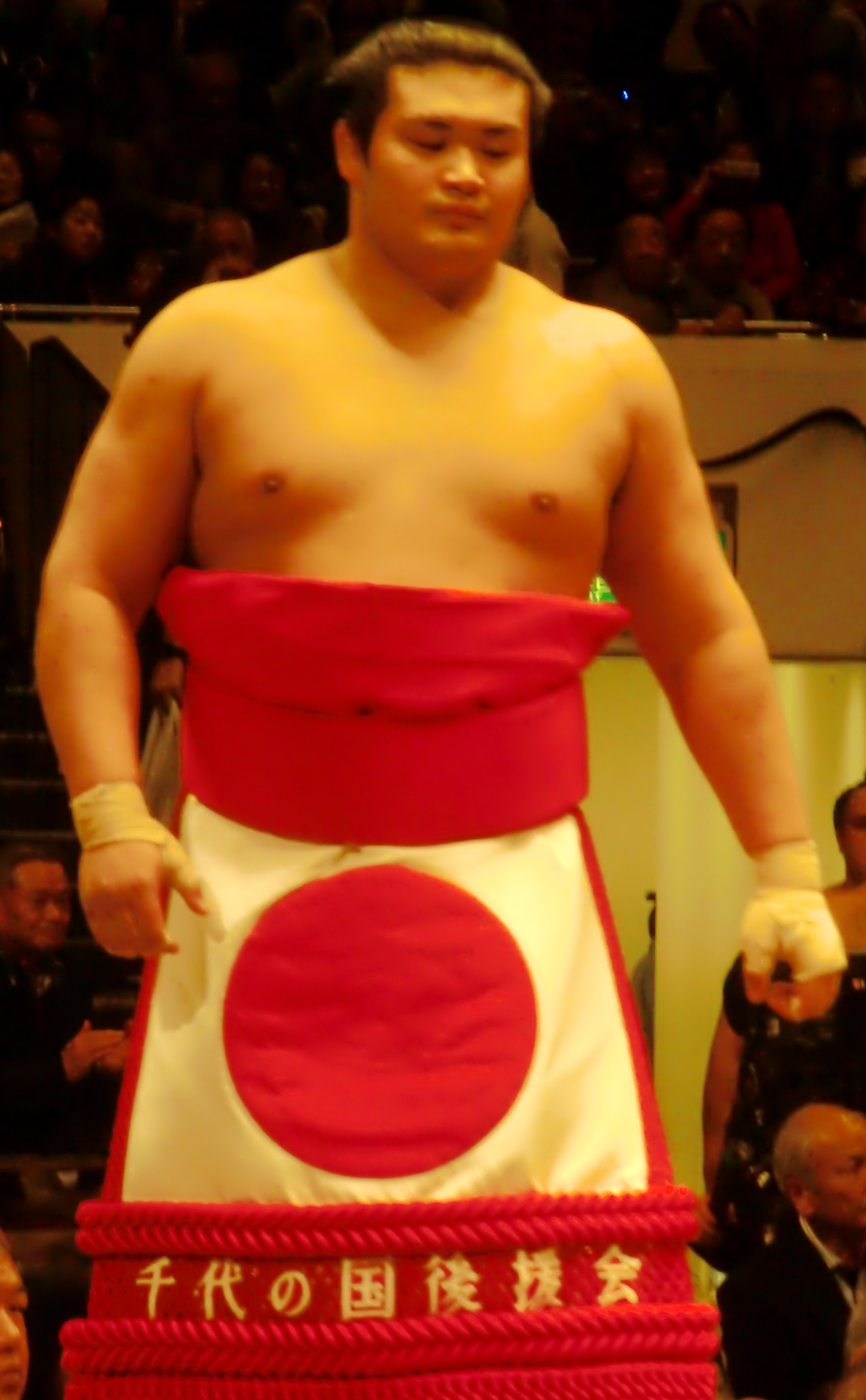
- Chiyonokuni in 2012

Personal information
- Native name: 千代の国 憲輝
- Born: Toshiki Sawada; 10 July 1990 (age 36) Iga, Mie, Japan
- Height: 1.81 m (5 ft 11 1/2 in)
- Weight: 147 kg (324 lb)

Sport
- Sport: Sumo
- Rank: see below
- Retired: July, 2023
- Heya: Kokonoe
- Record: 539-452-180
- Debut: May, 2006
- Highest rank: Maegashira 1 (May, 2017)
- Elder name: Sanoyama
- Championships: 3 Jūryō; 2 Makushita; 1 Sandanme; 1 Jonidan
- Special Prizes: 2 Fighting Spirit
- Gold Stars: 1 (Kakuryū)
- Updated on 21 July 2023

Chiyonokuni Toshiki (Japanese: 千代の国 憲輝; born 10 July 1990 as Toshiki Sawada (澤田 憲輝, Sawada Toshiki)) is a Japanese former professional sumo wrestler from Iga, Mie. He made his professional debut in May 2006 and reached the top makuuchi division for the first time in January 2012. He reached the highest rank of maegashira 1, but he has also been restricted by injuries, falling to the sandanme division in 2015. He staged another comeback and then once again had a serious injury in 2019, which sent him down the ranks. He made a final comeback which saw him stagnate in the second half of the jūryō division before his demotion and retirement. He is a member of Kokonoe stable where he is an elder under the name Sanoyama.

== Early life and sumo background ==
Toshiki Sawada was born the son of a Buddhist temple head priest. From a very young age he had great interest in combat sports such as karate. He has said he was in the fourth grade when he first foretold he would be a professional sumo wrestler in the future. As a member of his judo team in junior high school he advanced to the best sixteen in a national tournament.

== Career ==
Upon graduating from junior high school he joined former yokozuna Chiyonofuji's Kokonoe stable. He made his professional debut in May 2006. Though he recorded many winning tournaments in his career in the unsalaried ranks, he also missed four tournaments in this span, which would demote him each time and which he would have to fight back from in following tournaments. From the November 2008 tournament he missed two tournaments in a row, but he bounced back from this in the subsequent March 2009 tournament with a perfect 7-0 followed by a playoff win to take the jonidan championship or yūshō. His fortunes largely changed after this and he had a series of mostly winning tournaments culminating in a 6–1 record at makushita 41 and coming just short of the championship by losing a playoff to Tochitsubasa. He followed this with two strong 5-2 winning tournaments.

During this time, however the ramifications of the match-fixing scandal that would rock the sumo world were becoming apparent. Due to this, Chiyonokuni, along with many other upper makushita wrestlers was promoted to salaried ranks of jūryō for the July 2011 though his actual performance so far would not have not merited promotion. The expelled rikishi included his elder stablemate Chiyohakuho. Chiyonokuni was reported to have very mixed feelings about the scandal and admitted it felt surreal to be promoted to jūryō under such strange circumstances. He did however exceed expectations and about recorded three strong winning tournaments in a row to earn promotion to the top makuuchi division in January 2012.

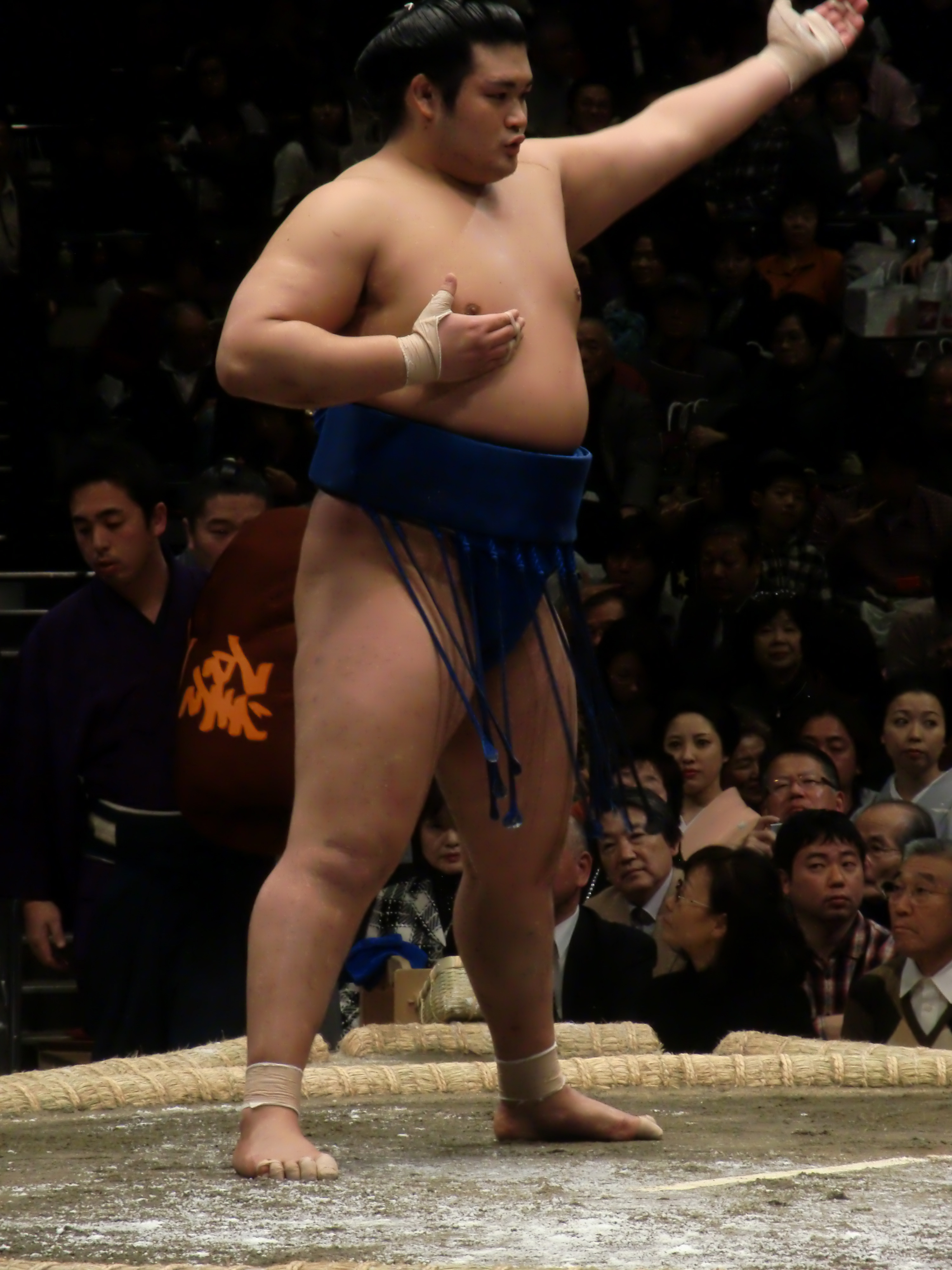
Chiyonokuni during his debut top division tournament in January 2012

Although he recorded a winning record in this tournament he had to withdraw due to a dislocated shoulder. In the following tournament in March he injured his shoulder again in a bout with Takanoyama on Day 11, which caused him to miss the May 2012 basho and drop down to the jūryō division. He won the jūryō championship on his comeback in July and returned to the top division in November. After scoring only 5–10 he was demoted to juryo again, but a 9–6 record at Juryo 2 in January 2013 ensured him of another top division return. Though he only managed 7–8 in March 2013 he managed to avoid relegation. He performed creditably in the May 2013 tournament, scoring 9–6, but was injured in the following tournament and withdrew with only two wins, resulting in another demotion to jūryō.

After four tournaments in the second division, he was again promoted to the top division, but another serious injury on only the second day in May 2014 would force him to sit out the rest of the tournament and guarantee his demotion to jūryō. Ranked at the bottom of the jūryō division in September 2014, he withdrew on Day 8 and did not return to competition until March 2015, by which time he had fallen to the fourth sandanme division. He began his comeback by winning the sandanme championship with a perfect 7–0 record, and in January 2016 he returned to sekitori status at jūryō 13 after four straight winning records in the makushita division. He marked ten years as a professional sumo wrestler by winning his second jūryō division championship in May 2016 with a 12–3 record, ensuring his return to the top division for the first time in two years. He achieved eight wins in the July 2016 tournament, his first kachi-koshi or winning record in makuuchi since 2013, although he withdrew because of injury on Day 13 meaning he had only completed three of his nine tournaments ranked in makuuchi.

He attained his highest rank to date of maegashira 1 in the May 2017 tournament, and on Day 2 defeated yokozuna Kakuryū to earn his first gold star or kinboshi. However he was only able to win one other bout and dropped back to maegashira 11 for the July 2017 tournament, where he secured his majority of wins. In May 2018 he earned his first sansho award, for Fighting Spirit, after a career best 12–3 performance. In July he benefited from two yokozuna withdrawals, getting a default win over Hakuhō on Day 4 and Kakuryū on Day 6. However, he was himself injured in a match against Tamawashi on Day 12 and withdrew from the tournament on the following day.

In January 2019 he was on the tournament leaderboard with just one loss up to Day 9 but damaged his left knee ligaments in losing to Ikioi on Day 10 and had to withdraw from the tournament. He underwent surgery on January 28 and did not enter the following tournament in March. He would suffer three demotions for missed tournaments before starting his comeback in September at the ranking of Makushita 46. In September, Chiyonokuni won the makushita division championship with a perfect 7–0 score, clinching the title with a victory over Terunofuji in his final match. While he struggled with 3-4 finishes from upper makushita ranks, he recovered in spectacular fashion after the May 2020 tournament was cancelled due to COVID. In the next basho Chiyonokuni won his second makushita championship in July 2020 with a 7–0 score from Makushita 12, followed by his third jūryō championship with a 14–1 record in September that would lead to a rare single-tournament promotion through Juryo. This gave him a total of seven championships in divisions below the top makuuchi division, which is a record. He was promoted back to makuuchi for the November 2020 tournament, making him only the third wrestler to twice return to the top division after falling to makushita or below, after Wakanoyama and Tamaasuka. In this tournament he produced a 10–5 record and received his second Fighting Spirit prize. He was forced to sit out the following tournament in January 2021 after several members of the Kokonoe stable tested positive for COVID-19. He returned in March with his previous rank preserved, and secured a majority of wins before withdrawing from the tournament because of a thumb injury and fractured rib. He withdrew on Day 4 of the May 2021 tournament with a left knee injury. He also had to withdraw during the March 2022 tournament due to a deltoid muscle injury), although he later returned. His series of injuries continued as he had to withdraw from the 2023 summer tournament from Day 10 after suffering meniscus injuries in both knees and suffering from osteoarthritis in his left knee. The absence was the 25th time Chiyonokuni had announced he was kyūjō and the third time his injuries had seen him drop from makuuchi to makushita. On the first day of the following tournament in July, it was announced that Chiyonokuni would also be absent for at least the first few days.

In July 2023 he finally announced his retirement. He decided to continue his career with the Japan Sumo Association by becoming an elder in his stable, under the name Sanoyama, succeeding former maegashira Tenkaihō. His retirement ceremony was held on 8 June 2024 at the Ryōgoku Kokugikan.

== Fighting style ==
Chiyonokuni is an oshi-sumo specialist, who prefers pushing and thrusting techniques to fighting on the mawashi or belt. His most common winning kimarite are hataki-komi, the slap down, and oshi-dashi, the push out.

== Personal life ==
Chiyonokuni was married in April 2017 to 26 year-old Ai Hayashi from Sakai, with the reception planned for February 2018. The couple met in 2010 when Chiyonokuni was still ranked in the makushita division.

His older brother Kensho Sawada was also a professional sumo wrestler under the shikona of Chiyonoshin and was a member of Kokonoe stable from 2002 until 2012, and fought one tournament in the makushita division. It was Chiyonoshin who introduced Chiyonokuni to sumo. In 2018 he opened a restaurant in their home town of Iga, named Dining Makuni (after their shikona).

== Career record ==
Chiyonokuni Toshiki
Year	January Hatsu basho, Tokyo	March Haru basho, Osaka	May Natsu basho, Tokyo	July Nagoya basho, Nagoya	September Aki basho, Tokyo	November Kyūshū basho, Fukuoka
2006	x	x	(Maezumo)	West Jonokuchi #38; 6–1	West Jonidan #76; Sat out due to injury 0–0–7	East Jonokuchi #26; 5–2
2007	West Jonidan #97; 4–3	East Jonidan #71; 6–1	East Jonidan #1; 3–4	West Jonidan #16; Sat out due to injury 0–0–7	West Jonidan #87; 5–2	East Jonidan #47; 4–3
2008	East Jonidan #21; 4–3	East Sandanme #100; 4–3	West Sandanme #81; 5–2	West Sandanme #51; 5–2	East Sandanme #22; 3–4	West Sandanme #34; Sat out due to injury 0–0–7
2009	West Sandanme #94; Sat out due to injury 0–0–7	West Jonidan #55; 7–0–P; Champion	East Sandanme #55; 4–3	East Sandanme #41; 6–1	East Makushita #54; 2–5	East Sandanme #18; 4–3
2010	East Sandanme #8; 4–3	East Makushita #58; 6–1	East Makushita #24; 4–3	West Makushita #20; 2–5	East Makushita #36; 3–4	East Makushita #41; 6–1–P
2011	West Makushita #17; 5–2	East Makushita #9; Tournament Cancelled; Match fixing investigation 0–0–0	East Makushita #9; 5–2	East Jūryō #11; 8–7	East Jūryō #9; 10–5	East Jūryō #3; 9–6
2012	East Maegashira #13; 9–5–1	East Maegashira #8; 3–10–2	West Maegashira #14; Sat out due to injury 0–0–15	East Jūryō #11; 11–4; Champion	East Jūryō #3; 10–5	West Maegashira #14; 5–10
2013	East Jūryō #2; 9–6	East Maegashira #14; 7–8	East Maegashira #15; 9–6	West Maegashira #10; 2–3–10	West Jūryō #2; 7–8	West Jūryō #3; 7–6–2
2014	East Jūryō #5; 7–8	East Jūryō #6; 9–6	West Maegashira #16; 0–2–13	West Jūryō #11; 6–9	West Jūryō #13; 3–5–7	East Makushita #8; Sat out due to injury 0–0–7
2015	West Makushita #48; Sat out due to injury 0–0–7	West Sandanme #28; 7–0; Champion	West Makushita #18; 4–3	West Makushita #14; 4–3	East Makushita #10; 5–2	West Makushita #4; 5–2
2016	West Jūryō #13; 10–5	East Jūryō #7; 9–6	East Jūryō #3; 12–3; Champion	East Maegashira #9; 8–5–2	East Maegashira #6; 8–7	West Maegashira #4; 5–10
2017	West Maegashira #8; 9–6	East Maegashira #6; 9–6	East Maegashira #1; 2–13 ★	East Maegashira #11; 8–7	East Maegashira #7; 9–6	East Maegashira #4; 6–9
2018	West Maegashira #7; 6–9	West Maegashira #10; 7–8	West Maegashira #11; 12–3; F	West Maegashira #2; 6–7–2	East Maegashira #4; 4–11	East Maegashira #11; 5–10
2019	East Maegashira #15; 8–3–4	East Maegashira #12; Sat out due to injury 0–0–15	West Jūryō #7; Sat out due to injury 0–0–15	East Makushita #6; Sat out due to injury 0–0–7	West Makushita #46; 7–0; Champion	West Makushita #2; 3–4
2020	East Makushita #6; 3–4	East Makushita #10; 3–4	West Makushita #12; Tournament Cancelled; State of Emergency; 0–0–0	West Makushita #12; 7–0; Champion	West Jūryō #11; 14–1; Champion	East Maegashira #14; 10–5; F
2021	East Maegashira #9; Sat out due to COVID rules 0–0–15	East Maegashira #9; 8–5–2	West Maegashira #3; 0–4–11	East Maegashira #16; 7–8	East Maegashira #17; 9–6	West Maegashira #14; 9–6
2022	East Maegashira #9; 4–11	West Maegashira #13; 5–6–4	East Jūryō #2; 6–9	East Jūryō #5; 8–7	East Jūryō #2; 6–9	West Jūryō #5; 6–9
2023	East Jūryō #7; 10–5	East Jūryō #2; 3–12	West Jūryō #9; 0–10–5	West Makushita #5; Retired; 0–0–7	x	x
Record given as wins–losses–absences Top division champion Top division runner-up Retired Lower divisions Non-participation Sanshō key: F=Fighting spirit; O=Outstanding performance; T=Technique Also shown: ★=Kinboshi; P=Playoff(s); Divisions: Makuuchi — Jūryō — Makushita — Sandanme — Jonidan — Jonokuchi Makuuchi ranks: Yokozuna — Ōzeki — Sekiwake — Komusubi — Maegashira

== See also ==
- Glossary of sumo terms
- List of sumo tournament second division champions
- List of active sumo wrestlers
- List of active gold star earners
- Active special prize winners
