= 善政 =

善政, meaning "virtuous, politics", is an Asian given name.

It may refer to:

- Chang San-cheng, Taiwanese politician
- Yoshimasa, Japanese given name
- Zhao Shanzheng (趙善政), first emperor of Datianxing (大天興)
