= Ōsunaarashi Kintarō =

Egyptian sumo wrestler

大砂嵐 金崇郎 Ōsuna-arashi Kintarō
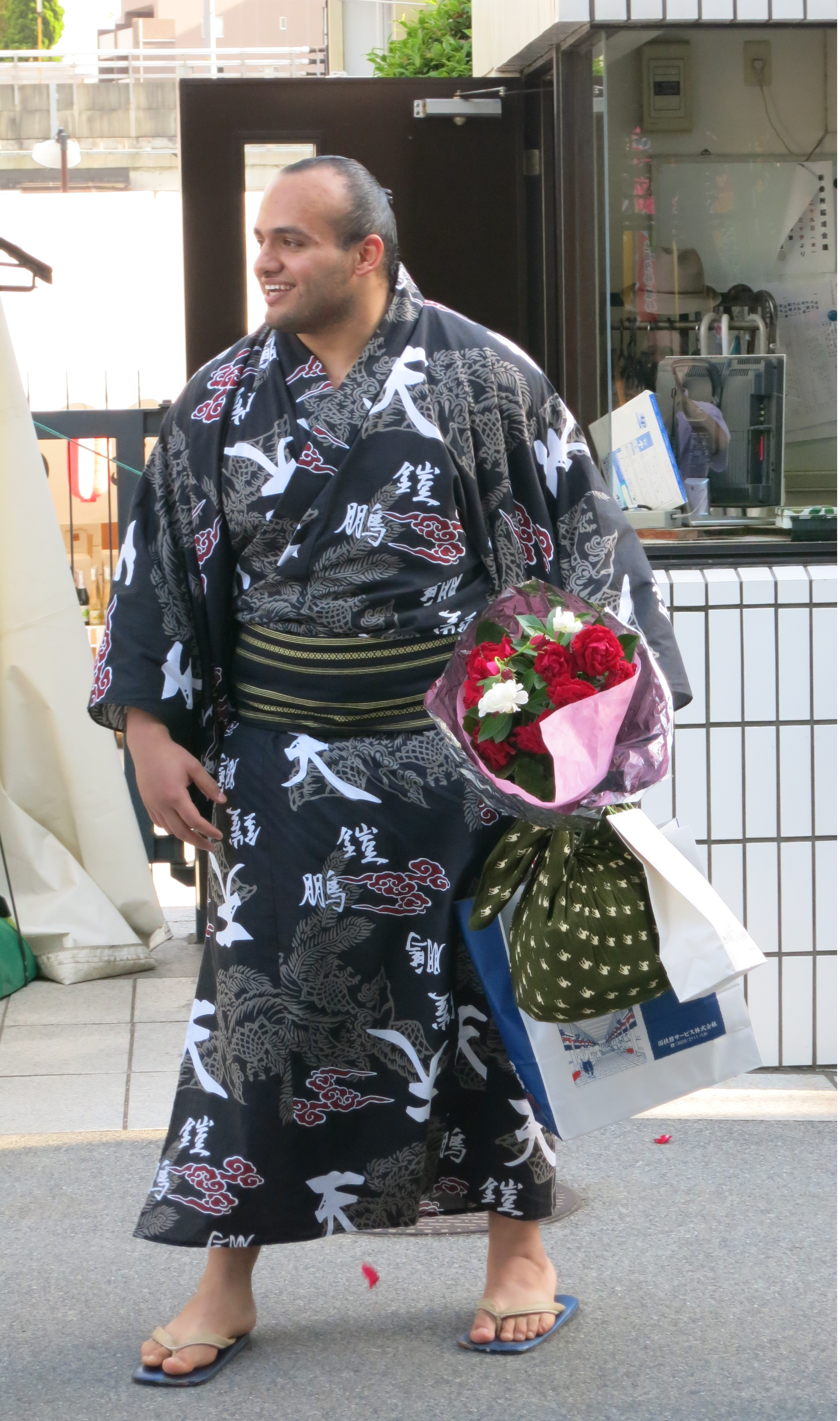
- Ōsunaarashi after winning makushita division in May 2013

Personal information
- Born: Abdelrahman Alaa el-Din Mohamed Ahmed Shalan; February 10, 1992 (age 34) Dakahlia Governorate, Egypt
- Height: 1.89 m (6 ft 2 1/2 in)
- Weight: 158 kg (348 lb)

Sport
- Sport: Sumo
- Retired: March 2018
- Heya: Ōtake
- Record: 238-178-53
- Debut: January 2012
- Highest rank: Maegashira 1 (November 2015)
- Championships: 1 (Jonokuchi); 1 (Makushita); 1 (Jūryō)
- Gold Stars: 3 Harumafuji (2); Kakuryū
- Updated on March 9, 2018

Ōsunaarashi Kintarō (大砂嵐 金崇郎) (born February 10, 1992, as Abdelrahman Shalan, Arabic: عبد الرحمن شعلان) is a retired sumo wrestler from Egypt. He was the first pro sumo wrestler from the African continent. Ōsunaarashi, whose chosen ring name translates into English as "great sandstorm", rose quickly through the unsalaried ranks, gaining the interest of Japanese media and popularity among sumo fans. Ōsunaarashi was promoted to the top tier makuuchi division for the November 2013 tournament. He emerged victorious from his first two matches against yokozuna-ranked wrestlers in July 2014. He dropped in rank after injury problems and was forced to retire in March 2018 after being involved in a traffic accident when he was driving without a valid license. After leaving sumo he signed with Rizin FF, a Japanese national mixed martial arts organization, where he joined other former rikishi like Baruto Kaito and Akebono Tarō. His mixed martial arts debut was at Rizin 13.

== Early life and sumo background ==
Shalan was born in the Dakahlia Governorate, near Cairo, Egypt. He was raised in the suburbs of Giza and as a youth showed an interest in bodybuilding. Through an acquaintance, he became involved in amateur sumo at the age of sixteen. In 2008, he won the silver medal in the Junior Sumo World Championships in Estonia, and the following year won the gold medal in an amateur championships in Bulgaria. In 2010 in earned a bronze medal at the Junior World Championships in Estonia. He entered university as an accounting major, but still felt drawn by his love for sumo. He decided to come to Japan in August 2011, despite knowing virtually nothing about the country, after watching professional sumo bouts on YouTube. He tried out at a number of sumo stables, and was eventually accepted by Ōtake stable. He accompanied the stable to tournaments and exhibitions as an observer while learning Japanese and procuring his visa.

== Ring name ==
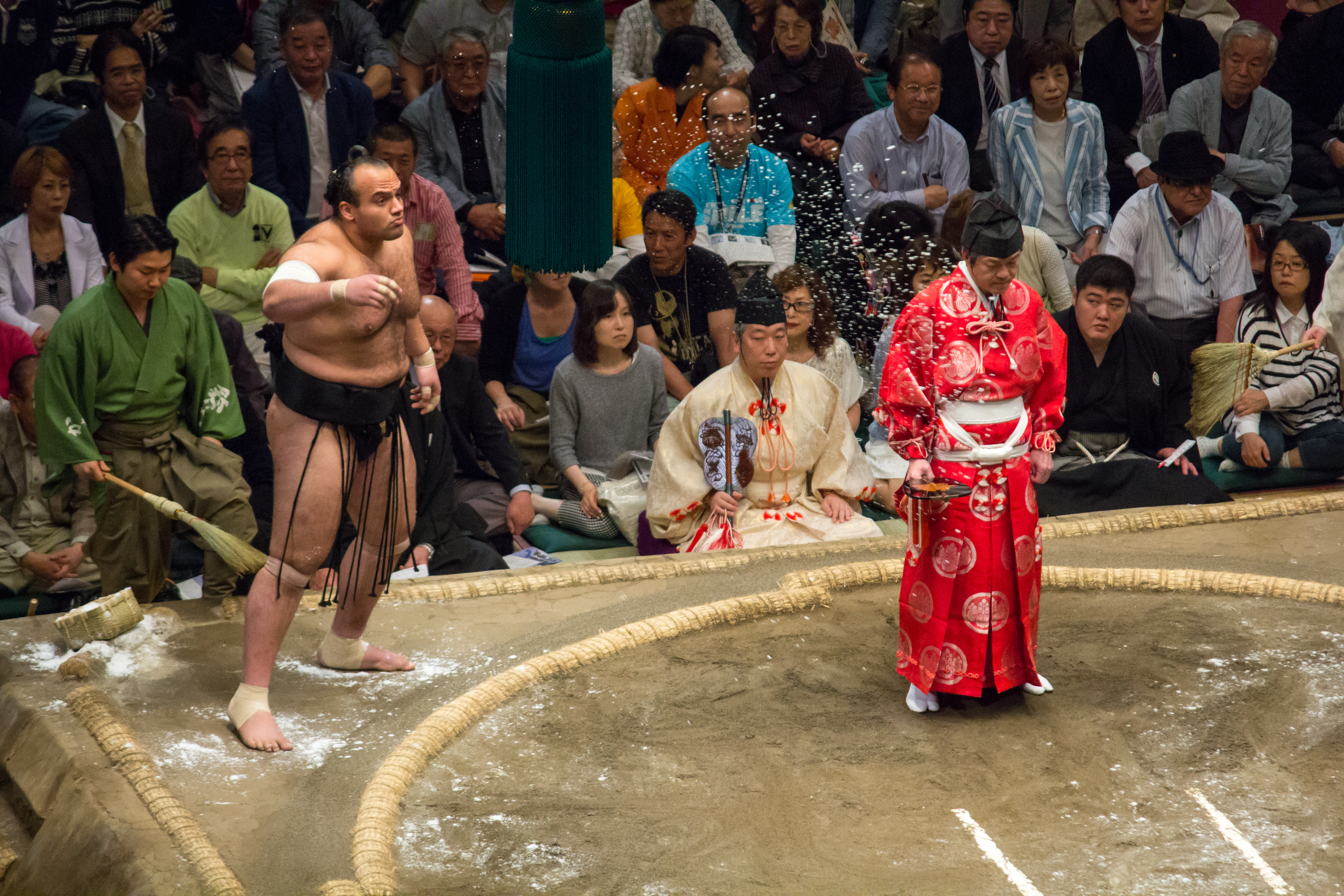
Ōsunaarashi in the May 2014 tournament

Ōsunaarashi's ring name, beyond the sandstorm reference, is also taken from his surname Shalan, as the second and third characters, can also be pronounced 砂 ("sha," meaning "sand") and 嵐 ("ran," meaning "storm"), respectively. The first kanji of 大 (pronounced "ō" or "dai," meaning "big") comes from the ring name of his stablemaster, the former Dairyū. His second name of Kintarō was chosen for two reasons; because his stablemaster thought he should have a very Japanese-sounding name to offset the fact he was a foreigner and as a reference to the character from folklore, Kintarō, who was said to have been so strong as to wrestle bears and beat them.

== Career ==
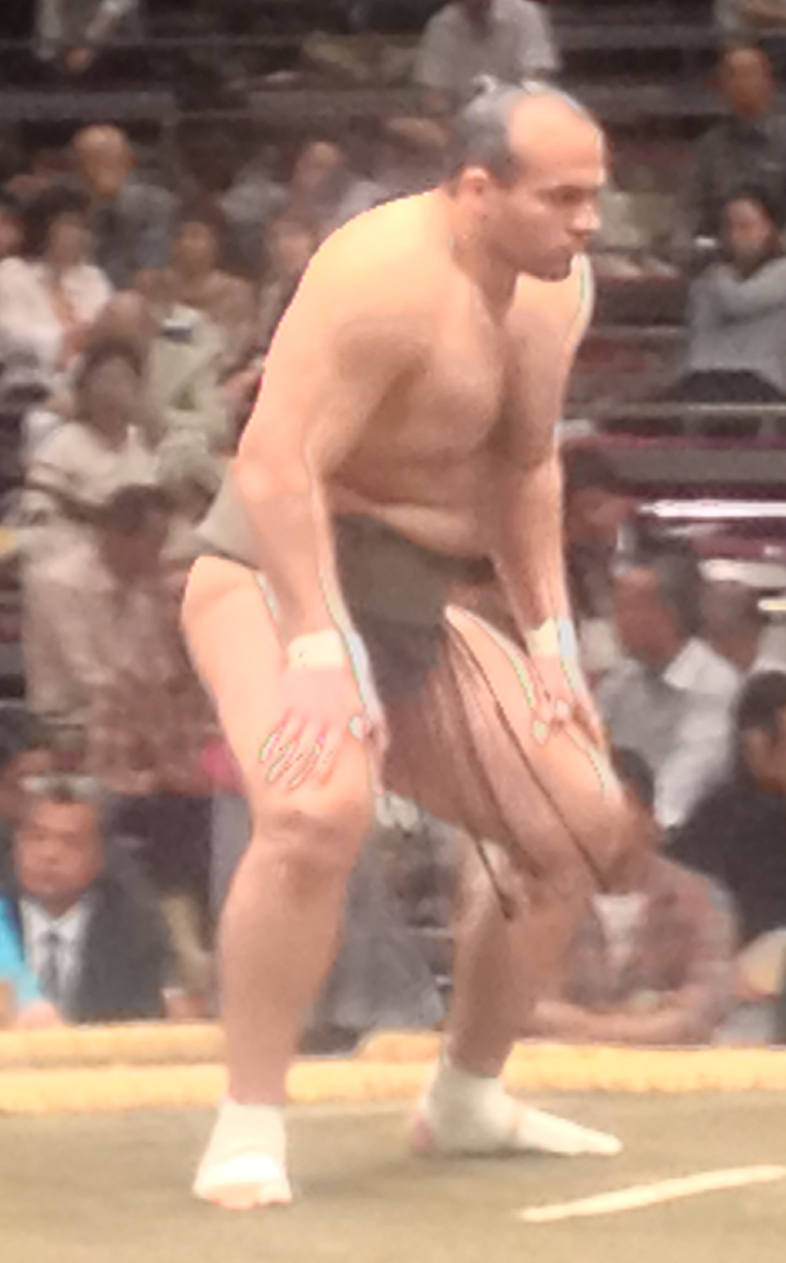
Ōsunaarashi in May 2013

Ōsunaarashi was allowed to participate in maezumō in the January 2012 tournament, and he debuted as a professional sumo wrestler in the following May tournament in Ōsaka at the rank of jonokuchi 5. He took the yusho or championship in this tournament with a perfect record of 7–0. He missed his first day of the next tournament in July 2012 due to a phlegmon inflammation, but was able to recover and return to the tournament to win all but one of his remaining bouts. From the September tournament onward he was very successful, never posting more than two losses in a tournament. In the May 2013 tournament he was promoted to a career best rank of makushita 7 and with a 7–0 perfect record took his second championship procuring his promotion to the salaried ranks of jūryō for the July tournament. Many sumo wrestlers struggle after reaching this professional ranks, but two consecutive 10-5 tournament records in this division earned him promotion to the highest ranked makuuchi division for the November 2013 tournament.

At the rank of maegashira 15 he came just short of a winning tournament at 7–8 in his top division debut. He managed to avoid demotion to jūryō for the following January 2014 tournament and achieved a strong 9–6 record. He sat out one match due to injury in the following March tournament, but still managed a winning record overall. Following a solid 10-5 performance in May, he was promoted to maegashira 3 for the July tournament. On the fifth day of the Nagoya tournament, in his first ever match against a yokozuna, he picked up a kinboshi for defeating Kakuryū. He then beat yokozuna Harumafuji on the very next day.

Ōsunaarashi reached what was to be his highest rank of maegashira 1 at the November 2015 tournament, and earned his third kinboshi with another upset of Harumafuji on Day 2. However, was hospitalized after the tournament, and pulled out of the following tournament in January 2016. Ōsunaarashi was relegated to jūryō for the March tournament and dominated the division, taking the championship with a 13–2 record to secure an immediate return to makuuchi. After suffering a recurrence of a knee injury, he withdrew shortly before the start of the July 2016 tournament in Nagoya. He was again relegated to jūryō for the September tournament and withdrew with a groin injury on the sixth day, although he returned on Day 9 and completed the tournament finishing with six wins. In November he missed two bouts after suffering further injury problems but his nine wins were enough to see him promoted back to the top division. The January 2017 tournament saw Ōsunaarashi come back to the top division at Maegashira 16, things looked good starting out as he won the first three days, however Ōsunaarashi then lost the next eleven bouts. Though he was able to get a win on the final day, he finished with a 4–11 record which put him back down in jūryō. March 2017 saw Ōsunaarashi at jūryō 7 where he was able to go 10-5 causing him to be in a three-way playoff for the jūryō championship, however he was defeated by Toyohibiki. He remained in the jūryō division for the rest of 2017.

== Fighting style ==
Ōsunaarashi's profile at the Japan Sumo Association listed his favoured techniques as tsuki/oshi, or thrusting and pushing. His two most common winning kimarite in his career were yori kiri (force out) and tsuki dashi (thrust out). He was known for the power of his right arm in particular.

== Retirement from sumo ==
He withdrew from the January 2018 tournament after he was suspected of causing an accident in Yamanouchi, Nagano on January 3 while driving without a license, defying the Japan Sumo Association’s ban on wrestlers driving. Although Ōsunaarashi said he had an international driving license, it had apparently expired. His lawyer initially claimed it was Ōsunaarashi's pregnant wife who was driving, but police established that it was Ōsunaarashi after studying surveillance camera footage. Ōsunaarashi was placed under "house arrest" by the Sumo Association on February 1, pending the decision of the public prosecutor on whether to file charges against him. The police referred the case to prosecutors on February 7, and the summary court fined him 500,000 yen on February 16. On March 9, the Sumo Association formally requested his retirement, the harshest punishment short of outright dismissal, and Ōsunaarashi indicated that he would comply.

== Post-retirement activities ==
Ōsunaarashi was told he would not be getting a danpatsu-shiki, or hair-cutting ceremony, and he appeared on Japanese television on March 31 with his head shaved, taking part in sumo matches with Bobby Ologun and Josh Barnett. He made his mixed martial arts debut on September 30, 2018, at the Rizin 13 event in the Saitama Super Arena where he lost to Bob Sapp. This is his only MMA appearance to date.

Ōsunaarashi was the coach for the Egyptian sumo team at the 2022 World Games. The sumo team was banned from competing the remaining sumo events after "poor sportsmanship" following a gold medal win in the men's lightweight in which the winning wrestler, Abdelrahman El-Sefy, celebrated his win in an excessive manner and Ōsunaarashi angrily arguing with officials.

Ōsunaarashi has continued to appear in amateur sumo exhibition tournaments in the United States, where he now resides.

== Personal life ==
He is a practicing Muslim. This, among other things, means he must observe Ramadan and fast during this period. It was reported that he found this especially challenging while active in professional sumo, as wrestlers are expected to eat heartily and train hard everyday, especially in their younger years, to build up bulk. When tournaments coincide with Ramadan, he admitted this made his tournament appearances at this time more challenging as he had to train and wrestle on an empty stomach.

In June 2016 he became a tourism ambassador for his native country, to encourage Japanese people to visit Egypt despite political upheaval. He promoted Egypt to Japan by starting a documentary, filming about the monuments and historical sites in Egypt; he developed a 15 million-strong viewership but also faced several obstacles that threatened the documentary.

Ōsunaarashi met his wife in an Egyptian restaurant in Japan while still active in sumo. Following his retirement in 2018, Ōsunaarashi and his family settled in the United States, initially in California. Since 2021 he has resided in Clifton, New Jersey. The couple have three sons.

== Career record ==
Ōsunaarashi Kintarō
Year	January Hatsu basho, Tokyo	March Haru basho, Osaka	May Natsu basho, Tokyo	July Nagoya basho, Nagoya	September Aki basho, Tokyo	November Kyūshū basho, Fukuoka
2012	x	(Maezumo)	West Jonokuchi #5; 7–0; Champion	West Jonidan #8; 5–1–1	East Sandanme #75; 6–1	East Sandanme #20; 6–1
2013	East Makushita #38; 5–2	East Makushita #23; 6–1	East Makushita #7; 7–0; Champion	West Jūryō #9; 10–5	East Jūryō #4; 10–5	West Maegashira #15; 7–8
2014	East Maegashira #16; 9–6	East Maegashira #11; 8–6–1	East Maegashira #10; 10–5	West Maegashira #3; 7–8 ★★	West Maegashira #4; 7–8	West Maegashira #5; 4–6–5
2015	East Maegashira #13; 8–7	East Maegashira #11; 11–4	West Maegashira #3; 4–4–7	West Maegashira #8; 11–4	East Maegashira #2; 8–7	West Maegashira #1; 5–9–1 ★
2016	East Maegashira #5; Sat out due to injury 0–0–15	East Jūryō #1; 13–2; Champion	West Maegashira #7; 9–6	East Maegashira #3; 0–1–14	West Jūryō #1; 6–8–1	West Jūryō #6; 9–4–2
2017	East Maegashira #16; 4–11	East Jūryō #7; 10–5–P	West Jūryō #1; 2–13	East Jūryō #11; 8–7	East Jūryō #10; 6–9	East Jūryō #13; 9–6
2018	West Jūryō #8; 1–8–6	East Makushita #6; Retired –	x	x	x	x
Record given as wins–losses–absences Top division champion Top division runner-up Retired Lower divisions Non-participation Sanshō key: F=Fighting spirit; O=Outstanding performance; T=Technique Also shown: ★=Kinboshi; P=Playoff(s); Divisions: Makuuchi — Jūryō — Makushita — Sandanme — Jonidan — Jonokuchi Makuuchi ranks: Yokozuna — Ōzeki — Sekiwake — Komusubi — Maegashira

== Mixed martial arts record ==
Professional record breakdown
1 match	0 wins	1 loss
By decision	0	1

Res.	Record	Opponent	Method	Event	Date	Round	Time	Location	Notes
Loss	0-1	(United States) Bob Sapp	Decision (unanimous)	Rizin 13	September 30, 2018	3	9:00	Saitama, Japan	Special Rules

== See also ==
- List of sumo tournament second division champions
- List of non-Japanese sumo wrestlers
- List of past sumo wrestlers
- Glossary of sumo terms
