= Ōhō Kōnosuke =

Japanese sumo wrestler

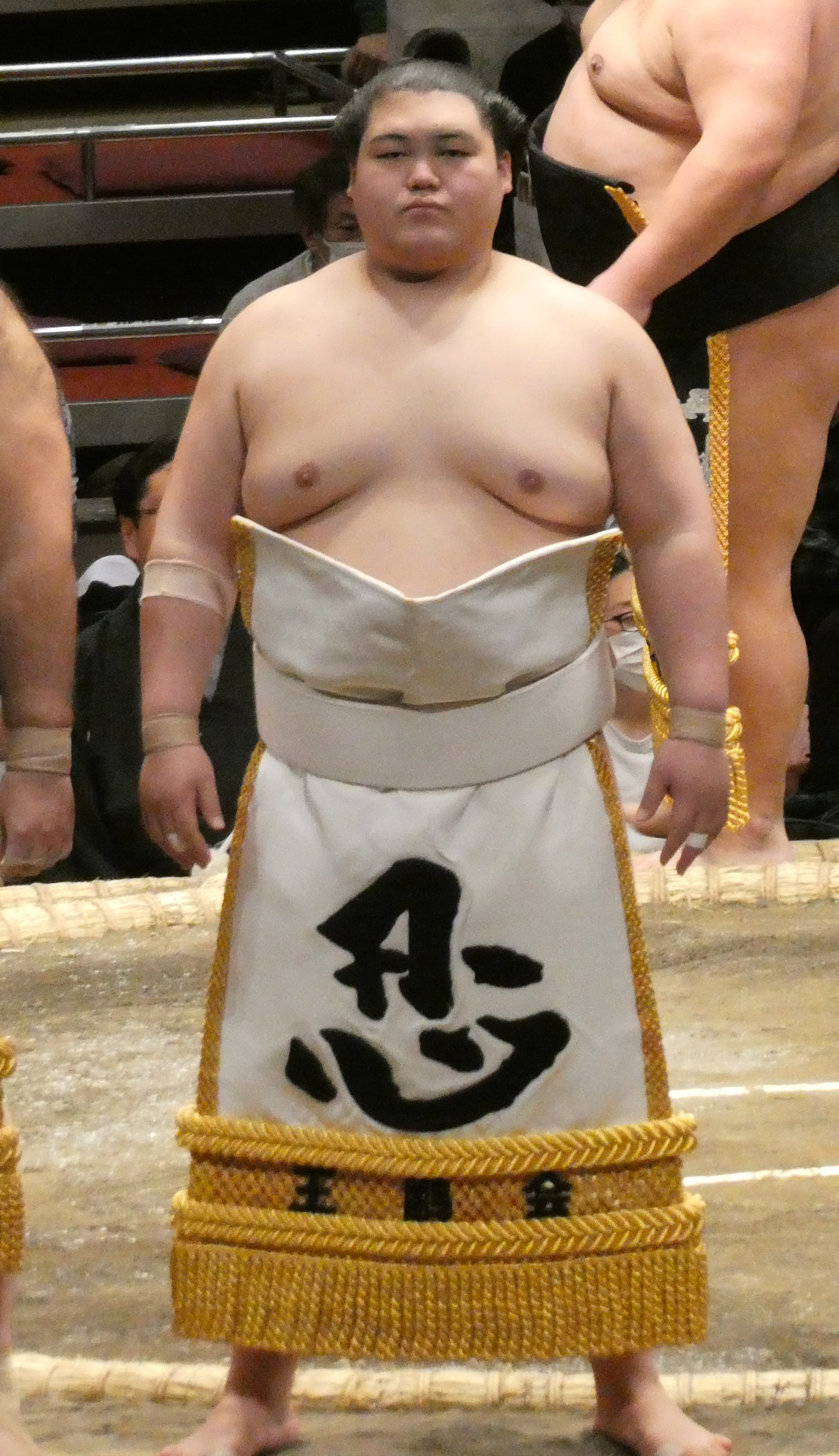
- Ōhō in January 2022

Personal information
- Native name: 王鵬 幸之介
- Born: Kōnosuke Naya; February 14, 2000 (age 26) Kōtō, Tokyo Prefecture, Japan
- Height: 1.90 m (6 ft 3 in)
- Weight: 185 kg (408 lb; 29.1 st)

Sport
- Sport: Sumo
- Rank: see below
- Heya: Ōtake
- Record: 274-220
- Debut: January 2018
- Highest rank: Sekiwake (March 2025)
- Championships: 1 (Jonokuchi)
- Special Prizes: 1 (Technique)
- Gold Stars: 3 Terunofuji; Hōshōryū; Ōnosato
- Updated on 16 July 2025

Ōhō Kōnosuke (Japanese: 王鵬 幸之介; born February 14, 2000, as Kōnosuke Naya (納谷 幸之介, Naya Kōnosuke)) is a Japanese professional sumo wrestler from Kōtō, Tokyo. He made his professional debut in January 2018, wrestling for Ōtake stable. He reached the second-highest division, jūryō, in January 2021 and reached the top division, makuuchi, in January 2022. His highest rank has been sekiwake. He has earned three gold stars for defeating a yokozuna and one special prize for Technique. He is a third generation makuuchi wrestler, the son of former sekiwake Takatōriki and the grandson of the 48th yokozuna Taihō.

== Early life and sumo background ==
Ōhō began sumo in elementary school, where he did reasonably well in tournaments despite having what he later admitted was a lazy attitude due to buying into his family legacy. He attended Saitama Sakae High School, which is famous for its sumo program. He was a high school classmate of future sekitori Kotoshōhō, Kotonowaka and Gōnoyama. In his third year, he won two national championships in both individual and team competition. Following his high school graduation, he elected to postpone his debut in professional sumo in order to compete in the 2017 All Japan Sumo Championships.

== Career ==
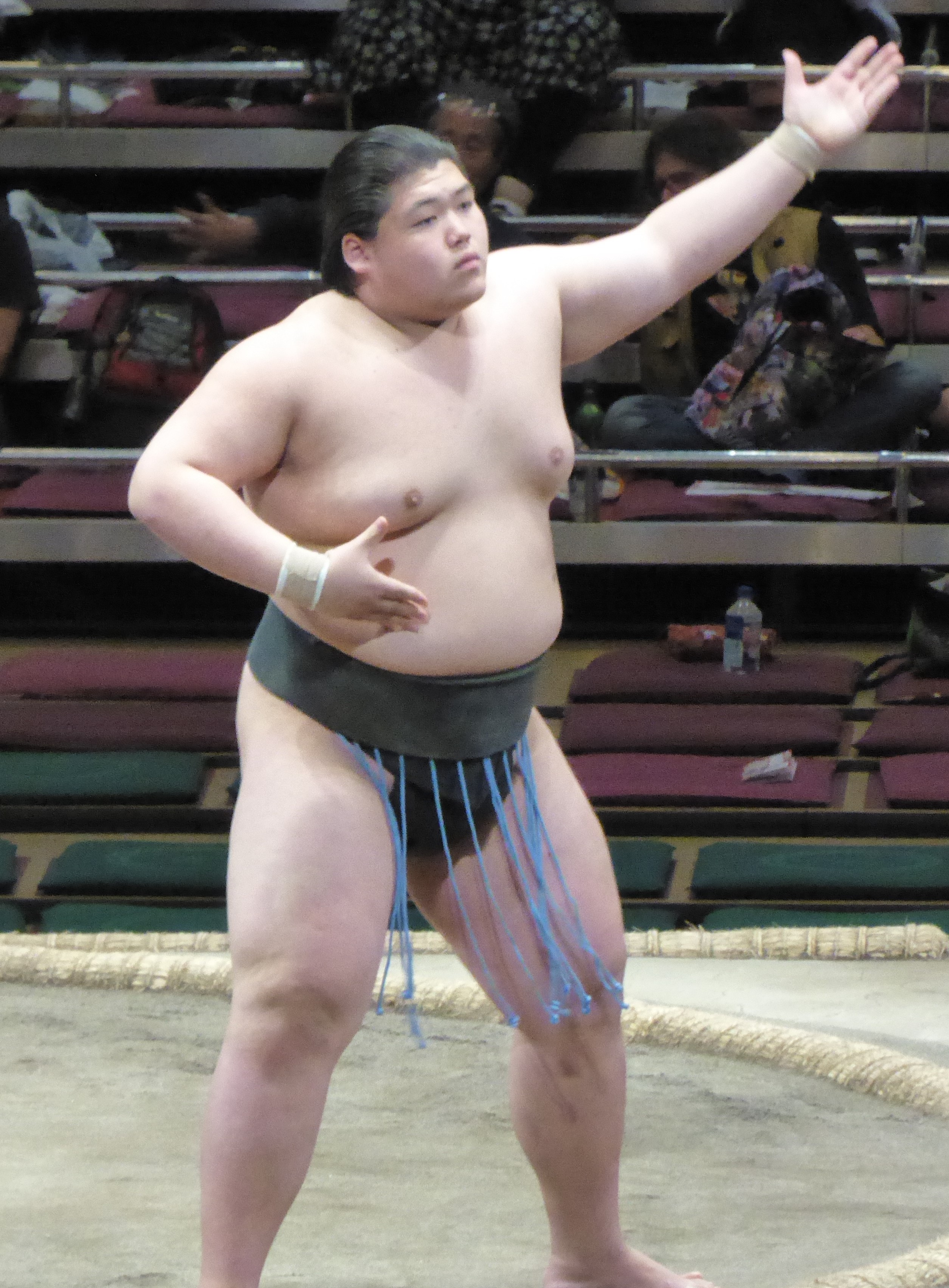
Ōhō in May 2018

=== Early career ===
In December 2017, Ōhō officially began training at Ōtake stable, which was founded by his grandfather Taihō and formerly owned by his father Takatōriki. He began training with sandanme and makushita ranked wrestlers while he was set to compete in the lowest division, jonokuchi. At the entrance exam for new recruits, he was both the tallest and heaviest recruit. He made his professional debut in January 2018, competing under his own surname Naya (納谷). During the presentation ceremony for new recruits, Ōhō presented himself wearing a keshō-mawashi that had belonged to his grandfather. During his first fights in maezumō, he defeated his three opponents, including fellow debutant Hōshōryū. In his first official tournament on the banzuke in March 2018, he won the jonokuchi division championship with a perfect 7–0 record, defeating Hōshōryū again and inflicting on him his only defeat of this tournament. Since then, he and Hōshōryū have maintained a certain rivalry.

Ōhō reached the makushita division in September 2018, and competed exclusively in makushita in 2019 and 2020. He steadily climbed the rankings, achieving winning records in nine of eleven tournaments. In the March 2019 tournament, Ōhō was in contention for the makushita championship but was defeated in his seventh match by eventual champion Churanoumi. In November 2020, he achieved a record of 6-1 from the top makushita rank which earned him a promotion to juryo.

His promotion to sekitori status saw him adopt the shikona Ōhō (王鵬). Ōtake (former jūryō wrestler Dairyū), Ōhō's stablemaster, commented that he had considered giving Ōhō the shikona Taihō (大鵬) but could not because Taihō was also the name of a non-transferable elder share (ichidai toshiyori) within the Sumo Association. He therefore replaced the character Dai (大) with Ō (王) as a bit of wordplay to evoke the memory of Taihō and the solid mentality of Ōhō. The character Ō (王) can be pronounced the same as the character Dai (大) which is commonly used by wrestlers of Ōtake stable in deference to both the founder's (Taihō) and the current stablemaster's (Dairyū) shikona. The character Hō (鵬) is taken directly from Taihō's shikona.

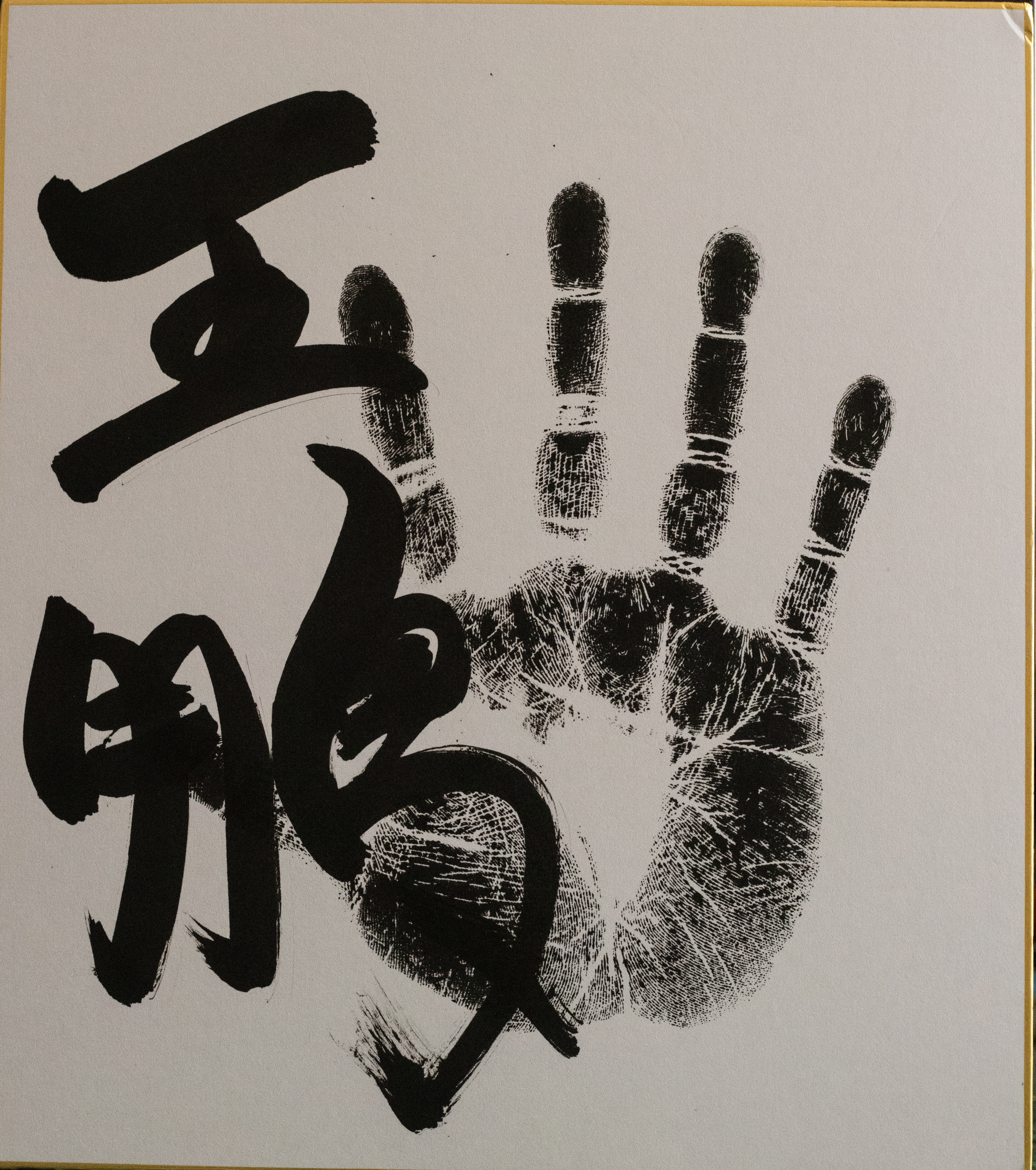
Ōhō original tegata (handprint & signature)

Ōhō's jūryō debut in January 2021 ended with a 5–10 record and he was demoted back to makushita; however, he quickly returned to jūryō by achieving a winning record in March. On his return to jūryō, Ōhō scored eight victories but injured his right ankle and had to leave the competition on the final day, handing a victory by default to his opponent Wakamotoharu. This injury absence was the first of his career. He posted double-digit winning records in two of the next three tournaments. His 11-win performance at jūryō 7 in November 2021 was enough to promote him to the top makuuchi division for the January 2022 tournament.

=== Makuuchi career ===
After the banzuke for the January 2022 tournament was announced, confirming him at maegashira 18, Ōhō spoke to reporters and said he was looking forward to competing in the top division, that he had visited his grandfather's grave, and he thought his grandfather, who died aged 72 in 2013, was cheering him on in heaven. In his makuuchi debut Ōhō began well with seven wins from his first ten bouts but he lost his last five to finish with a record of 7–8. Ōhō attributed his late fade to a lack of concentration. The losing record saw him demoted to jūryō for the March 2022 tournament but he returned to makuuchi in May 2022 with the rank of maegashira 14 following a 10–5 record. He competed in makuuchi for the remainder of 2022, alternating winning and losing records.

Ōhō achieved his first double-digit win performance in the top division in November 2022. On Day 12, he defeated Sekiwake Hōshōryū to improve to 10–2, sharing the lead with Hōshōryū and Takayasu. However, he lost to Takayasu the following day, and finished with a 10-5 record.

Over the course of 2023, Ōhō was able to cement his status in the top division but struggled with consistency, posting losing scores in four of six tournaments but also achieving a career-best score of 11-4 in the May tournament. In August of that year, after his rival Hōshōryū was promoted to the rank of ōzeki, Ōhō commented on how far he still had to go after achieving mixed results in the first half of the year and mentioned his regret at not being able to compete at the san'yaku level.

Ōhō's 2024 started well with a 10-5 record in the January tournament and was promoted to a career-high rank of maegashira 3. In the March tournament, he narrowly missed scoring a winning record in his first tournament in the joi-jin but he earned his first gold star for defeating yokozuna Terunofuji. In the May tournament, he finished 6-9 but was able to defeat two ōzeki (Kirishima on Day 6 and Hōshōryū on Day 7) and two sekiwake (Abi on Day 9 and Wakamotoharu on Day 14). In the September tournament, he scored a win over Takakeisho in what would prove to be the former ōzeki's final match as a professional, along with wins over the ōzeki Hōshōryū and Kotozakura en route to a 9-6 record. At the beginning of October, stablemaster Ōtake announced that Ōhō would undergo surgery to repair an orbital fracture, which occurred in his Day 6 contest against Abi. Ōhō withdrew from the autumn regional tours, but Ōtake said he expected him to recover in time to compete in the November tournament.

During the 2024 November tournament, Ōhō stood out by inflicting defeat over ōzeki Kotozakura.

In the 2025 January tournament, Ōhō stood out again by beating most of his better-ranked opponents in the san'yaku during the first week, also inflicting defeat on ōzeki Ōnosato and recording a personal best six consecutive wins since the first day of the tournament. On Day 7 (a day coinciding with the anniversary of the death of Taihō, Ōhō's grandfather), he recorded his first defeat at the hands of yokozuna promotion-seeker Hōshōryū, knocking Ōhō out of the leading group of wrestlers for the title. On Day 8, he suffered a second defeat at the hands of ōzeki Kotozakura. Ōhō was able to bounce back by staying not far behind the wrestlers competing for the title, recording three more consecutive wins before suffering a third defeat by Kirishima. Maintaining his position among the leading wrestlers of the championship, Ōhō faced the leader of the competition, Kinbōzan, on the final day with the chance to trigger a playoff in case of victory. Ōhō won the match, forcing at the very least a playoff between the two wrestlers. Later, Hōshōryū also qualified for the title, with the playoff becoming a three-way fight. Hōshōryū won the title by defeating Kinbōzan and Ōhō back-to-back. Since Ōhō had attracted a lot of favorable comment on his solid tournament, he received his first sanshō, the Technique prize, however missing out on the award for Outstanding Performance after he failed to win the championship.

Following Ōhō's performance in the January tournament, he was promoted for the first time into the san'yaku ranks, debuting in the March 2025 tournament at the rank of sekiwake. This equaled the career-high rank of his father, the former Takatōriki and former Ōtake stablemaster. He and his father became the seventh father-son pair in sumo history to be promoted into the san'yaku. Ōhō told reporters following his promotion that he was very happy, saying that the things he had been working on helped him to acquire strength little by little. He added that his job would be to continue to win steadily and consistently. Ōhō's score in the March tournament was an unremarkable 6-9, though he was able to defeat the eventual tournament winner, ōzeki Ōnosato, on Day 13.

Prior to the May 2025 tournament, Ōhō held a party to commemorate his sekiwake promotion. It was his first official promotion party, as he could not hold celebrations to mark his jūryō or makuuchi promotions due to the COVID-19 pandemic. On Day 3 of the May tournament he defeated yokozuna Hōshōryū for his second career gold star.

In the July 2025 tournament, Ōhō became the first wrestler to defeat newly-promoted yokozuna Ōnosato for his third career kinboshi.

== Fighting style ==
Ōhō prefers pushing and thrusting techniques (tsuki/oshi) over grabbing his opponent's belt (yotsu-zumō). The majority of his wins are by oshidashi (frontal push out), yorikiri (frontal force out), tsukidashi (frontal thrust out), and oshitaoshi (front push down). He has been criticized by the commentator and former yokozuna Kitanofuji for a reliance on pull-down attempts.

== Personal life ==
Ōhō is a third-generation professional sumo wrestler. His maternal grandfather is the 48th yokozuna Taihō. His mother, Mieko, is Taihō's third daughter. His father is former sekiwake Takatōriki. Ōhō is the third-born of four brothers. His oldest brother, Yukio, is a professional wrestler in Japan. His second-oldest brother, Takamori, joined Ōtake stable in 2020 after an amateur career at Chuo University and wrestles in sandanme under the shikona Naya (納谷). His younger brother, Kōsei, joined the stable in 2019 and wrestles in jūryō under the shikona Mudohō (夢道鵬).

According to his official profile on the Sumo Association's website, his favorite foods are fruit and karaage (Japanese-style fried chicken). His hobby is reading manga, his favorite series being One Piece. His favorite television show is Ametalk!.

== Career record ==
Ōhō Kōnosuke
Year	January Hatsu basho, Tokyo	March Haru basho, Osaka	May Natsu basho, Tokyo	July Nagoya basho, Nagoya	September Aki basho, Tokyo	November Kyūshū basho, Fukuoka
2018	(Maezumō)	East Jonokuchi #18; 7–0; Champion	East Jonidan #11; 6–1	West Sandanme #50; 6–1	East Makushita #60; 3–4	West Sandanme #11; 4–3
2019	West Makushita #60; 4–3	East Makushita #51; 6–1	East Makushita #22; 6–1	West Makushita #6; 3–4	East Makushita #10; 4–3	East Makushita #7; 4–3
2020	East Makushita #5; 3–4	West Makushita #8; 4–3	East Makushita #5; Tournament Cancelled; State of Emergency; 0–0–0	East Makushita #5; 4–3	West Makushita #4; 5–2	West Makushita #1; 6–1
2021	West Jūryō #11; 5–10	East Makushita #2; 4–3	West Jūryō #14; 8–7	West Jūryō #12; 10–5	East Jūryō #6; 7–8	East Jūryō #7; 11–4
2022	East Maegashira #18; 7–8	East Jūryō #1; 10–5	East Maegashira #14; 6–9	West Maegashira #15; 8–7	West Maegashira #13; 7–8	West Maegashira #13; 10–5
2023	West Maegashira #8; 4–11	West Maegashira #15; 7–8	West Maegashira #16; 11–4	West Maegashira #6; 6–9	West Maegashira #7; 5–10	East Maegashira #12; 8–7
2024	West Maegashira #11; 10–5	East Maegashira #3; 7–8 ★	East Maegashira #4; 6–9	West Maegashira #6; 9–6	West Maegashira #2; 9–6	East Maegashira #1; 6–9
2025	West Maegashira #3; 12–3–PP; T	West Sekiwake #1; 6–9	West Maegashira #1; 7–8 ★	East Maegashira #2; 7–8 ★	West Maegashira #2; 10–5	West Sekiwake #1; 7–8
2026	East Komusubi #1; 4–11	West Maegashira #3; 7–8	West Maegashira #3; 9–6	West Komusubi #1; 2–13	East Maegashira #10; 7–8	West Maegashira #10; 9–6
Record given as wins–losses–absences Top division champion Top division runner-up Retired Non-participation Jūryō Lower divisions Sanshō key: F=Fighting spirit; O=Outstanding performance; T=Technique Also shown: ★=Kinboshi; P=Playoff(s); Divisions: Makuuchi — Jūryō — Makushita — Sandanme — Jonidan — Jonokuchi Makuuchi ranks: Yokozuna — Ōzeki — Sekiwake — Komusubi — Maegashira

== See also ==
- Glossary of sumo terms
- List of active sumo wrestlers
- List of active gold star earners
- List of active special prize winners
- List of sumo top division runners-up
- List of sekiwake
