= Tamaasuka Daisuke =

Japanese sumo wrestler

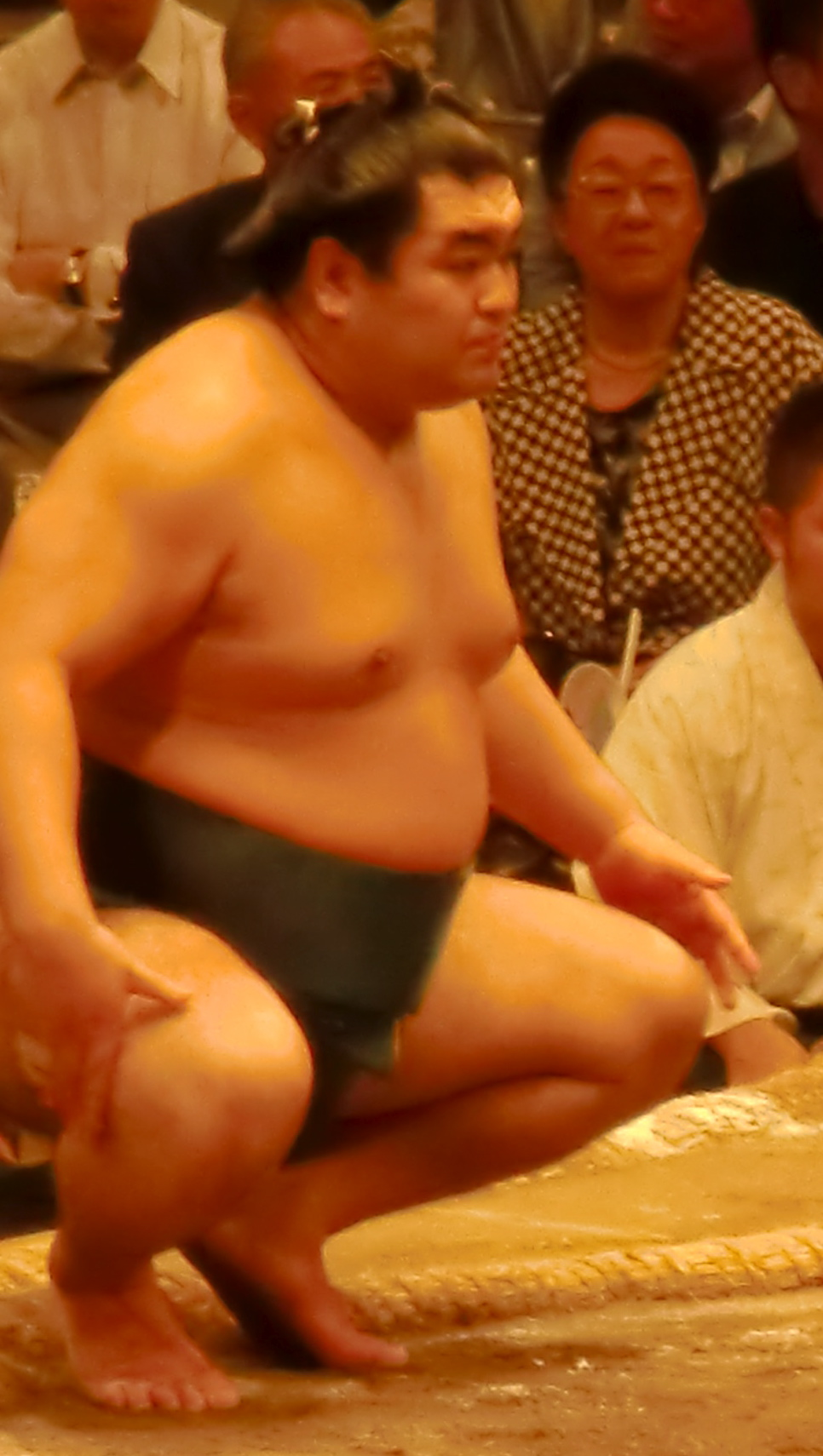

Personal information
- Native name: 玉飛鳥 大輔
- Born: Daisuke Takahashi; January 26, 1983 (age 43) Atsuta-ku, Nagoya, Aichi Prefecture, Japan
- Height: 1.85 m (6 ft 1 in)
- Weight: 154 kg (340 lb; 24.3 st)

Sport
- Sport: Sumo
- Retired: September, 2016
- Heya: Kataonami
- Record: 580-569-29
- Debut: March 1998
- Highest rank: Maegashira 9 (September, 2005)
- Elder name: Kumagatani
- Championships: 2 (Jūryō); 2 (Makushita)
- Updated on Sept 29, 2016

Tamaasuka Daisuke (born January 26, 1983, as Daisuke Takahashi or Kumagatani) is a former sumo wrestler from Atsuta-ku, Nagoya, Aichi Prefecture, Japan. He made his professional debut in March 1998. His highest rank was maegashira 9. He was well known for moving between the top makuuchi division and the second jūryō division on several occasions. He won two makushita and two jūryō division championships. He retired in September 2016 and is now a sumo coach.

== Early life and sumo background ==
Daisuke was born in Nagoya and started sumo in the fourth grade of elementary school. He was enrolled by his father in the Choyko Sumo Club, based in the Aichi Prefectural Gymnasium where the annual Nagoya honbasho is held. At Hibino Middle School, he became Middle School Yokozuna in 1997. He made his professional debut in March 1998, joining Kataonami stable. Just weeks beforehand, his father had died of a heart attack. It had been he who had chosen Tamaasuka's ring name or shikona and had driven him to become a wrestler by installing a rigorous training program for him. His father's death only made Tamaasuka more determined to succeed in professional sumo.

== Career ==
After six years of steady but unspectacular progress in the lower ranks, Tamaasuka was promoted to the second highest jūryō division in November 2004 after winning the makushita championship with a perfect 7-0 record. In his jūryō debut he scored eight wins against seven losses by winning and then losing on alternate days, an oddity not seen in the top two divisions since 1988. He reached the top makuuchi division in the Nagoya tournament in July 2005, making his debut alongside Hakurozan. He was the first wrestler from Nagoya to reach the top division since Tochitsukasa in 1981.

Cheered on by his hometown fans, Tamaasuka scored nine wins in his top division debut. He would have received the Kantō-shō or Fighting Spirit Prize had he won on the final day, but he was defeated by Tokitenkū. He was promoted to maegashira 9, but could only manage a disappointing 4-11 record in the next tournament. On the fourth day of the November 2005 tournament he broke his left ankle and was forced to pull out. As a result, he was demoted back to the jūryō division. It was the first time in his career that he had missed any bouts. Since he had an enforced layoff, he decided to undergo eyesight corrective surgery in December 2005. He had not fully recovered from either his injury or his surgery by the January 2006 tournament but felt he had to compete to try to prevent demotion to the unsalaried makushita division. However, in the event he withdrew once again after losing his first two bouts. He largely remained in the third division for the next three years.

In May 2008 he won his second makushita division championship, once more with a perfect 7-0 record. This performance returned him to the sekitori ranks for the first time since November 2006. His return was not successful however, as he could only manage a 5–10 score at jūryō 13. He returned to the jūryō division once again for the November 2008 tournament; a 6–1 score at the rank of makushita 4 elevating him to jūryō 8. Although he turned in 5-10 again, it was enough on this occasion to keep him in the division. However a further 5-10 score in January 2009 saw him demoted once again. He scored 6-1 in March 2009, losing a playoff for the makushita division championship, which was enough for an immediate return to jūryō.

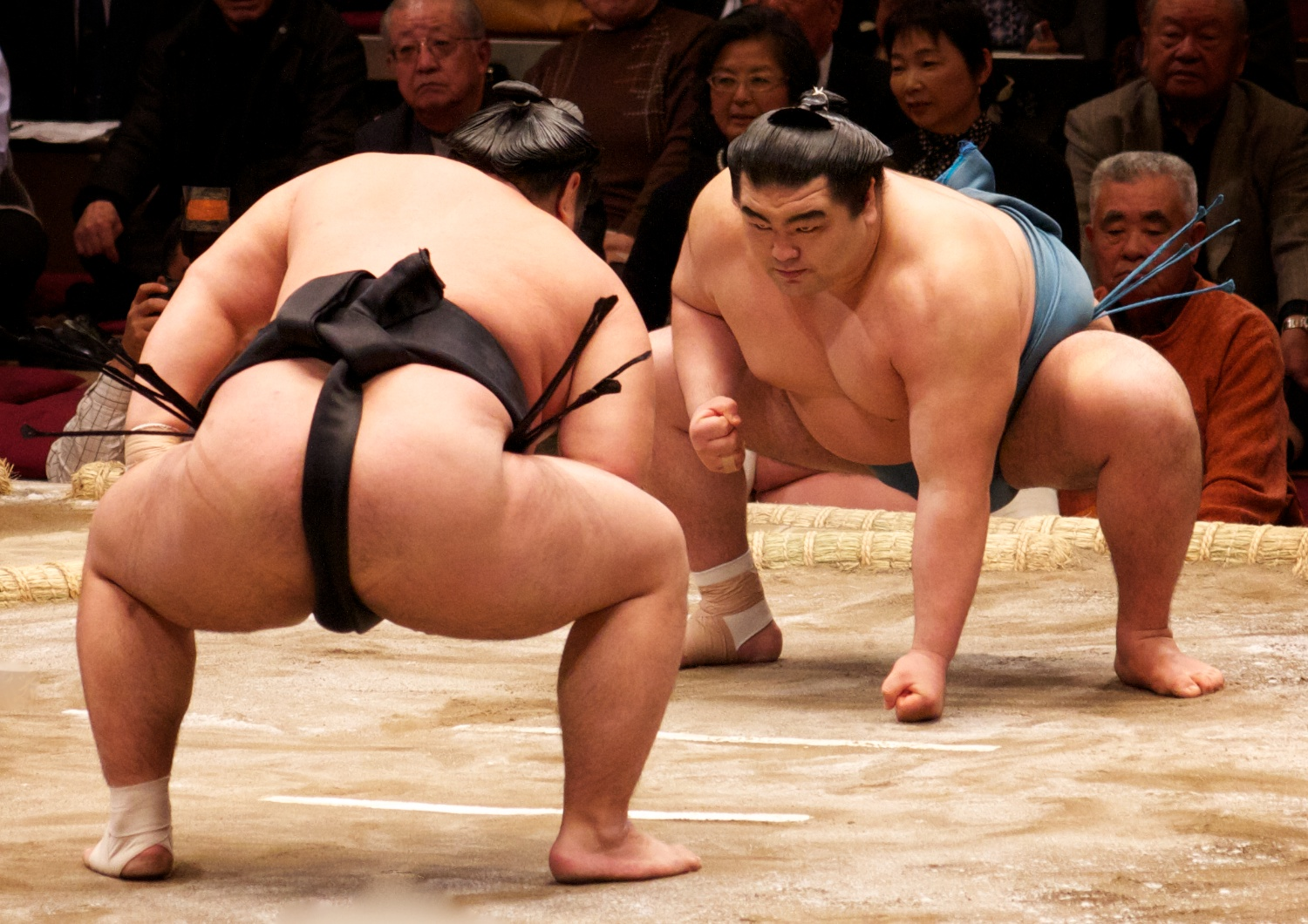
Tamaasuka with his injured right ankle taped, January 2010

In May 2009 he not only made his first kachi-koshi at a sekitori rank in nearly four years but won his first jūryō championship with a 12–3 record. He followed up with another strong 11–4 record in July 2009, ensuring himself of a return to the top division for the first time in nearly four years. The 23 tournaments it took him to win back promotion is the fifth longest ever, behind Satoyama, Wakanoyama, Daihi and Daizen. In the September 2009 tournament, fighting from the maegashira 13 ranking, he recovered from 3-9 to win his last three matches and stay in the top division. He was forced to withdraw from the following tournament in November, his first absence since January 2006, after injuring his right ankle and he fell back to jūryō as a result. He won promotion back to the top division for July 2010 after a 10–5 score in May, but could manage only five wins on his return. Two poor performances of 5–10 and 4-11 saw him demoted to makushita for the first time since January 2009 after the November 2010 tournament, but he won promotion back to the sekitori ranks immediately.

In September 2011 Tamaasuka was promoted back to makuuchi after scoring 8-7 at jūryō 1in the preceding July tournament. He thus became the second wrestler (after Wakanoyama) to twice achieve the feat of returning to makuuchi after dropping to makushita. Once again he lasted only one tournament back in the top division. He won his second jūryō championship in May 2012 with a score of 12–3 and secured promotion back to makuuchi, but produced his worst performance in the top division to date in the following tournament, winning only two bouts. However, he responded by earning a sixth promotion to the top division for January 2013, but was demoted after only one tournament. After two more tournaments in jūryō he received his seventh promotion to the top division and this time was able to remain there for his longest stint yet of three tournaments before being demoted again.

He did not manage to reach makuuchi in 2014 and had an even less successful year in 2015, losing sekitori status after the November 2015 tournament for the first time in five years. He won promotion back to jūryō after the March 2016 tournament. He said that his ambition for the remainder of his career was to earn another kachi-koshi or winning score in the top division, something which he only achieved once, in his makuuchi debut in 2005. However May 2016 turned out to be his final tournament at sekitori level.

== Retirement from sumo ==
Tamaasuka retired after the September 2016 tournament, after a record of 4–3 at makushita 9. His career record was 580 wins against 569 losses, with 29 absences due to injury. His top division record was 54-109-17. Of his 111 career tournaments 51 were at sekitori level, with 12 in the makuuchi division and 39 in jūryō. He became an elder of the Japan Sumo Association, initially known as Araiso Oyakata. In April 2018 he switched to the Kumagatani name. He works as a coach at Kataonami stable.

Following the September 2025 tournament Tamaasuka will take over the Ōtake stable as its new stablemaster from the retiring former jūryō Dairyū, who will reach sumo's mandatory retirement age of 65, by swapping the Kumagatani and Ōtake elder stocks.

== Fighting style ==
Tamaasuka was proficient in both yotsu-sumo (grappling) and oshi-sumo (pushing and thrusting) techniques. He used oshi techniques at the beginning of a match to set up his preferred yotsu position, a basic sumo style. His favoured grip on his opponent's mawashi was hidari-yotsu, a right hand outside, left hand inside position. His most often used winning kimarite was yori-kiri (force out), followed by oshi-dashi (push out).

== Personal life ==
Tamaasuka is married with three sons. He has said that he would like at least one of his sons to follow him into professional sumo, and also use the Tamaasuka shikona that was given to him by his own late father.

== Career record ==
Tamaasuka Daisuke
Year	January Hatsu basho, Tokyo	March Haru basho, Osaka	May Natsu basho, Tokyo	July Nagoya basho, Nagoya	September Aki basho, Tokyo	November Kyūshū basho, Fukuoka
1998	x	(Maezumo)	East Jonokuchi #31; 5–2	West Jonidan #141; 5–2	West Jonidan #98; 5–2	East Jonidan #52; 5–2
1999	East Jonidan #16; 3–4	East Jonidan #35; 3–4	East Jonidan #53; 5–2	East Jonidan #13; 4–3	East Sandanme #93; 5–2	West Sandanme #55; 4–3
2000	West Sandanme #42; 4–3	East Sandanme #27; 4–3	East Sandanme #13; 5–2	East Makushita #53; 2–5	West Sandanme #15; 5–2	West Makushita #50; 3–4
2001	West Sandanme #1; 2–5	East Sandanme #21; 6–1	West Makushita #44; 4–3	East Makushita #35; 3–4	East Makushita #47; 2–5	West Sandanme #8; 4–3
2002	West Makushita #58; 5–2	East Makushita #40; 5–2	West Makushita #28; 5–2	East Makushita #14; 2–5	West Makushita #29; 4–3	West Makushita #19; 3–4
2003	East Makushita #27; 3–4	West Makushita #38; 5–2	East Makushita #24; 4–3	West Makushita #18; 3–4	West Makushita #27; 3–4	West Makushita #37; 6–1
2004	East Makushita #12; 3–4	East Makushita #19; 4–3	West Makushita #16; 5–2	East Makushita #6; 4–3	West Makushita #4; 7–0; Champion	East Jūryō #12; 8–7
2005	West Jūryō #6; 6–9	East Jūryō #8; 10–5	West Jūryō #2; 10–5	East Maegashira #14; 9–6	West Maegashira #9; 4–11	West Maegashira #15; 0–5–10
2006	West Jūryō #9; 0–3–12	East Makushita #10; 5–2	East Makushita #6; 4–3	West Makushita #4; 4–3	East Makushita #3; 5–2	West Jūryō #14; 7–8
2007	West Makushita #1; 3–4	West Makushita #4; 3–4	East Makushita #8; 5–2	East Makushita #5; 3–4	West Makushita #8; 2–5	West Makushita #16; 3–4
2008	East Makushita #25; 3–4	West Makushita #31; 6–1	West Makushita #12; 7–0; Champion	East Jūryō #13; 5–10	East Makushita #4; 6–1	East Jūryō #8; 5–10
2009	West Jūryō #13; 5–10	East Makushita #5; 6–1–P	West Jūryō #13; 12–3; Champion	West Jūryō #1; 11–4	East Maegashira #13; 6–9	East Maegashira #16; 3–5–7
2010	East Jūryō #7; 5–10	East Jūryō #13; 11–4–P	East Jūryō #4; 10–5	East Maegashira #16; 5–10	West Jūryō #4; 5–10	West Jūryō #10; 4–11
2011	West Makushita #2; 4–3	Tournament Cancelled; 0–0–0	West Jūryō #12; 8–7	West Jūryō #1; 8–7	West Maegashira #13; 4–11	East Jūryō #4; 5–10
2012	West Jūryō #8; 8–7	West Jūryō #6; 9–6	West Jūryō #2; 12–3; Champion	East Maegashira #10; 2–13	East Jūryō #4; 8–7	West Jūryō #2; 8–7
2013	West Maegashira #16; 4–11	East Jūryō #6; 8–7	West Jūryō #2; 10–5	West Maegashira #14; 6–9	West Maegashira #15; 7–8	West Maegashira #16; 4–11
2014	West Jūryō #5; 9–6	West Jūryō #1; 6–9	West Jūryō #4; 8–7	West Jūryō #2; 6–9	East Jūryō #6; 6–9	West Jūryō #8; 8–7
2015	East Jūryō #6; 8–7	West Jūryō #3; 6–9	East Jūryō #6; 5–10	East Jūryō #10; 8–7	East Jūryō #8; 4–11	West Jūryō #14; 5–10
2016	East Makushita #4; 4–3	West Makushita #1; 5–2	West Jūryō #14; 5–10	East Makushita #3; 3–4	East Makushita #9; 4–3	West Makushita #6; Retired –
Record given as wins–losses–absences Top division champion Top division runner-up Retired Lower divisions Non-participation Sanshō key: F=Fighting spirit; O=Outstanding performance; T=Technique Also shown: ★=Kinboshi; P=Playoff(s); Divisions: Makuuchi — Jūryō — Makushita — Sandanme — Jonidan — Jonokuchi Makuuchi ranks: Yokozuna — Ōzeki — Sekiwake — Komusubi — Maegashira

== See also ==
- Glossary of sumo terms
- List of sumo tournament second division champions
- List of past sumo wrestlers
- List of sumo elders
