= Takatōriki Tadashige =

Japanese sumo wrestler

Personal information
- Native name: 貴闘力 忠茂
- Born: Tadashige Kamakari; September 28, 1967 (age 59) Kobe, Japan
- Height: 1.81 m (5 ft 11 1/2 in)
- Weight: 147 kg (324 lb)

Sport
- Sport: Sumo
- Retired: September, 2002
- Heya: Futagoyama
- Record: 754–703–0
- Debut: March, 1983
- Highest rank: Sekiwake (September, 1991)
- Elder name: Ōtake
- Championships: 1 (Makuuchi); 1 (Makushita)
- Special Prizes: Outstanding Performance (3); Fighting Spirit (10); Technique (1)
- Gold Stars: 9 Akebono (7); Ōnokuni; Asahifuji
- Updated on June 2020

Takatōriki Tadashige (貴闘力 忠茂; born September 28, 1967 as Tadashige Kamakari (鎌苅 忠茂, Kamakari Tadashige)) is a former sumo wrestler and professional wrestler from Kobe, Japan. He made his professional debut in 1983, reaching the top division in 1990. His highest rank was sekiwake. Known for his great fighting spirit, he won 14 tournament prizes, including a record ten Kantō-shō, and earned nine gold stars for defeating yokozuna ranked wrestlers. He wrestled for the highly successful Futagoyama stable. He was twice runner-up in top division tournaments and in March 2000, from the maegashira ranks, he unexpectedly won the yūshō or championship. He retired in 2002 and became the head coach of Ōtake stable, having married the daughter of the previous owner of the heya, the great yokozuna Taihō. However, he was dismissed from the Sumo Association in 2010 for his role in an illegal gambling scandal.

== Career ==
As a young boy Takatōriki idolised Takanohana Kenshi and even stayed with the former ōzeki and his family in Tokyo for a while. He joined Takanohana's Fujishima stable in March 1983 after leaving junior high school, where he had also done judo. Initially fighting under his own surname of Kamakari, he rose up the ranks rather slowly, finally becoming a sekitori in May 1989 after six years in the unsalaried divisions.

Takatōriki reached the top makuuchi division in September 1990, along with future yokozuna Akebono and Wakanohana III. He won eleven bouts and the Fighting spirit prize in his top division debut, and in his next tournament he defeated his first yokozuna, Ōnokuni. He had a very successful year in 1991, becoming the only man in the top division to achieve a winning record in every tournament that year. On the third day of the May 1991 tournament, he defeated yokozuna Chiyonofuji, who announced his retirement that night. In July 1991 he was promoted to sekiwake, the highest rank he was to achieve. He won fourteen sanshō, or special prizes in his career, the fourth best ever. He earned seven kinboshi from Akebono, a record against one yokozuna (Takamiyama also earned seven from Wajima). He was runner-up in the tournaments of March 1994 (losing in a three-way playoff that also involved Akebono and stablemate Takanonami) and September 1996.

Towards the end of his career, in March 2000 at the age of 32, he won his only top division yūshō, or tournament title. This win was considered a great upset as two poor performances had sent him down to maegashira 14 in the rankings, and Takatōriki faced demotion from makuuchi altogether. He won his first twelve matches, and though he was then defeated by yokozuna Akebono and Musashimaru, he clinched the championship by beating Miyabiyama to finish on 13–2. After his final bout, confirming his tournament win, Takatōriki was visibly shaken. He was awarded his tenth Fighting Spirit Prize (two ahead of his nearest rival, stablemate Akinoshima) and third Outstanding Performance Award, and was promoted to a san'yaku rank for the final time for the May 2000 tournament. In total he spent 15 tournaments at sekiwake and 11 at komusubi.

Takatōriki fell into the jūryō division in 2001 and announced his retirement in September 2002. He did not miss a single bout during his 19-year career, finishing with 754 wins and 703 losses. His 1456 consecutive career matches place him fourth on the all-time list, after Aobajō, Fujizakura and Tamawashi.

== Fighting style ==
Takatōriki's fighting style was fierce, and he often relied on initial powerful face slaps (harite) to stun his opponents. He was a tsuki-oshi wrestler, preferring pushing and thrusting to fighting on the mawashi or belt. His most common winning technique was oshi-dashi or push out. However, due to his background in judo he was also adept at throws, some extremely rarely seen in the top division. He employed nichonage, the body drop down, on three occasions in makuuchi, and once pulled off the spectacular amiuchi, or fisherman's net casting throw.

== Retirement from sumo ==
Having married the third daughter of Taihō (and changed his legal name from Kamakari to Naya), Takatōriki took over the running of the former yokozuna's stable in February 2003. It was renamed Ōtake stable. It was the home of the Russian top division wrestler Rohō until he was banned from sumo in September 2008 for testing positive for marijuana.

Along with five other oyakata (Magaki, Ōnomatsu, Otowayama, Tokiwayama and Futagoyama), he was forced to leave the Nishonoseki ichimon or group of stables in January 2010 after declaring his support for his former stablemate Takanohana's unsanctioned bid to be elected to the board of directors of the Sumo Association.

== Expulsion ==
In June 2010 he admitted that he had been gambling illegally on baseball, after an investigation by the Sumo Association and Tokyo police prompted by articles in the tabloid weekly Shukan Shincho. It subsequently emerged that he had been borrowing large amounts of money from ōzeki Kotomitsuki to pay gambling debts. He was reportedly gambling on a much larger scale than others implicated in the scandal, betting tens of millions of yen, and knew that a bookmaker used in the gambling had links to a crime syndicate. He was expelled from the Sumo Association at a special meeting on July 4, and apologised for his actions at a press conference. He received no severance pay. Ōtake stable was spared having to close and was taken over by another coach at the stable, the former Dairyū. Takatoriki's status as Taihō's adopted son was voided and he divorced Taihō's daughter.

He announced in September 2010 that he was opening up a yakiniku restaurant in Kōtō, Tokyo.

In March 2011 prosecutors announced that Ōtake, as well as Kotomitsuki and 25 others involved in the scandal, would be spared indictment over gambling due to lack of implicating evidence.

In 2017 Takatoriki spoke out against the controversial plan to bring casinos to Japan. He said he had become addicted to casino gambling after a foreign sumo tour and would visit foreign casinos more than ten times a year, losing nearly five million dollars.

In 2020 Takatoriki started his own YouTube channel, which has frequently criticized the Japan Sumo Association. In July 2026, he revealed on his YouTube channel that he had been hospitalized following a stroke that occurred in May.

== Professional wrestling career ==
Takatoriki's first appearance in professional wrestling was originally in 2013, getting attacked by Atsushi Onita in a Real Japan Pro Wrestling show for criticizing him after a match between Onita and Original Tiger Mask. Afterwards, he announced he would be debuting soon in the professional wrestling circuit, and that he would challenge his old sumo enemy and fellow pro wrestler Akebono in the future. On April 16, 2014 Takatoriki debuted for RJPW, teaming up with Minoru Suzuki to defeat Jadogun (Atsushi Onita and Ichiro Yaguchi). He would later appear in 2015 for Legend Pro Wrestling, teaming up with Riki Choshu and Tiger Mask to defeat again Jadogun, now including Hideki Hosaka. After the match, Onita challenged Takatōriki, but he replied that he originally debuted with the intention of only competing for a year and that this was his final match. Although he later retracted his statement and demanded Akebono to wrestle him in his true last match, Tadashige ceased activity in professional wrestling altogether.

== Family ==
Takatōriki married the third daughter of Taihō, Mieko, in 1993 when she was 19 years old. They had four children, all boys. According to his ex-wife, Takatoriki was determined to make all four of them sumo wrestlers. His eldest son Yukio (born 1994) is a professional wrestler who made his debut in 2017. His second son Takamori (born 1998) graduated from Saitama Sakae High School where he was a key member of their sumo team and entered the Chuo University sumo club. He entered professional sumo upon graduation in March 2020, initially taking the shikona Hozan before switching to Naya after his brother changed his own shikona. His third and fourth sons Kōnosuke (born 2000) and Kōsei (born 2001) were also amateur sumo wrestlers in high school who moved into the professional sport before Takamori. Kōnosuke joined Ōtake stable and made his debut in January 2018. He reached the jūryō division following the November 2020 tournament and changed his shikona from his own surname, Naya, to Ōhō. Kōsei joined Ōtake stable in November 2019. His shikona is Mudōhō.

== Career record ==
Takatōriki Tadashige
Year	January Hatsu basho, Tokyo	March Haru basho, Osaka	May Natsu basho, Tokyo	July Nagoya basho, Nagoya	September Aki basho, Tokyo	November Kyūshū basho, Fukuoka
1983	x	(Maezumo)	East Jonokuchi #33; 6–1–P	West Jonidan #103; 4–3	East Jonidan #78; 3–4	East Jonidan #90; 3–4
1984	East Jonidan #92; 6–1	East Jonidan #18; 2–5	East Jonidan #44; 1–6	East Jonidan #74; 4–3	West Jonidan #64; 6–1	West Sandanme #99; 6–1
1985	West Sandanme #50; 2–5	West Sandanme #82; 6–1	West Sandanme #38; 5–2	East Sandanme #11; 2–5	East Sandanme #39; 5–2	West Sandanme #8; 5–2
1986	East Makushita #43; 3–4	West Makushita #57; 3–4	East Sandanme #10; 5–2	West Makushita #44; 2–5	East Sandanme #14; 3–4	West Sandanme #22; 2–5
1987	West Sandanme #52; 6–1	West Sandanme #5; 5–2	East Makushita #45; 3–4	West Makushita #56; 5–2	East Makushita #35; 3–4	West Makushita #43; 5–2
1988	West Makushita #25; 3–4	West Makushita #33; 4–3	West Makushita #27; 3–4	West Makushita #37; 6–1	East Makushita #17; 4–3	East Makushita #11; 4–3
1989	East Makushita #8; 5–2	East Makushita #5; 6–1	West Jūryō #13; 6–9	West Makushita #2; 7–0–P; Champion	East Jūryō #10; 7–8	East Jūryō #12; 8–7
1990	West Jūryō #8; 11–4	East Jūryō #3; 8–7	West Jūryō #1; 9–6	East Jūryō #1; 10–5	East Maegashira #13; 11–4; F	West Maegashira #2; 5–10 ★
1991	East Maegashira #8; 9–6	West Maegashira #1; 9–6; O★	West Komusubi #1; 9–6; F	West Sekiwake #1; 9–6; F	East Sekiwake #1; 8–7	East Sekiwake #1; 8–7
1992	West Sekiwake #1; 7–8	East Maegashira #2; 6–9	East Maegashira #5; 6–9	East Maegashira #8; 9–6	East Maegashira #2; 10–5	West Komusubi #2; 5–10
1993	West Maegashira #5; 5–10	East Maegashira #12; 9–6	West Maegashira #6; 11–4; T	East Komusubi #1; 8–7	East Komusubi #1; 7–8	East Maegashira #1; 5–10
1994	East Maegashira #7; 6–9	East Maegashira #12; 12–3–PP; F	West Maegashira #1; 9–6; F★	West Komusubi #2; 10–5; F	West Sekiwake #1; 8–7	West Sekiwake #1; 6–9
1995	West Maegashira #1; 7–8 ★	East Maegashira #2; 8–7	East Komusubi #1; 5–10	West Maegashira #3; 9–6 ★	East Maegashira #1; 8–7	West Komusubi #1; 7–8
1996	East Maegashira #1; 12–3; F★	West Sekiwake #2; 8–7	West Sekiwake #2; 7–8	West Komusubi #1; 10–5; F	West Sekiwake #1; 11–4; F	East Sekiwake #1; 6–9
1997	West Maegashira #1; 11–4	West Sekiwake #1; 7–8	West Komusubi #1; 6–9	West Maegashira #1; 11–4; O★	West Sekiwake #2; 9–6	West Sekiwake #2; 6–9
1998	East Maegashira #1; 5–10	West Maegashira #4; 7–8 ★	East Maegashira #5; 9–6	West Maegashira #1; 10–5 ★	West Sekiwake #1; 8–7	West Sekiwake #1; 5–10
1999	East Maegashira #2; 8–7	East Maegashira #1; 8–7	West Komusubi #1; 5–10	East Maegashira #3; 4–11	East Maegashira #7; 9–6	East Maegashira #2; 2–13
2000	East Maegashira #10; 6–9	East Maegashira #14; 13–2; FO	West Komusubi #2; 2–13	West Maegashira #8; 9–6	East Maegashira #4; 6–9	East Maegashira #5; 4–11
2001	East Maegashira #12; 8–7	West Maegashira #9; 5–10	West Maegashira #14; 5–10	West Jūryō #2; 9–6–P	East Maegashira #14; 6–9	East Jūryō #1; 7–8
2002	East Jūryō #2; 9–6	West Maegashira #14; 6–9	West Jūryō #1; 4–11	East Jūryō #7; 5–10	West Jūryō #11; Retired; 3–10	x
Record given as wins–losses–absences Top division champion Top division runner-up Retired Lower divisions Non-participation Sanshō key: F=Fighting spirit; O=Outstanding performance; T=Technique Also shown: ★=Kinboshi; P=Playoff(s); Divisions: Makuuchi — Jūryō — Makushita — Sandanme — Jonidan — Jonokuchi Makuuchi ranks: Yokozuna — Ōzeki — Sekiwake — Komusubi — Maegashira

== See also ==
- List of sumo record holders
- List of sumo tournament second division champions
- List of sumo tournament top division champions
- List of sumo tournament top division runners-up
- Glossary of sumo terms
- List of past sumo wrestlers
- List of sekiwake
