= Yoshimasa =

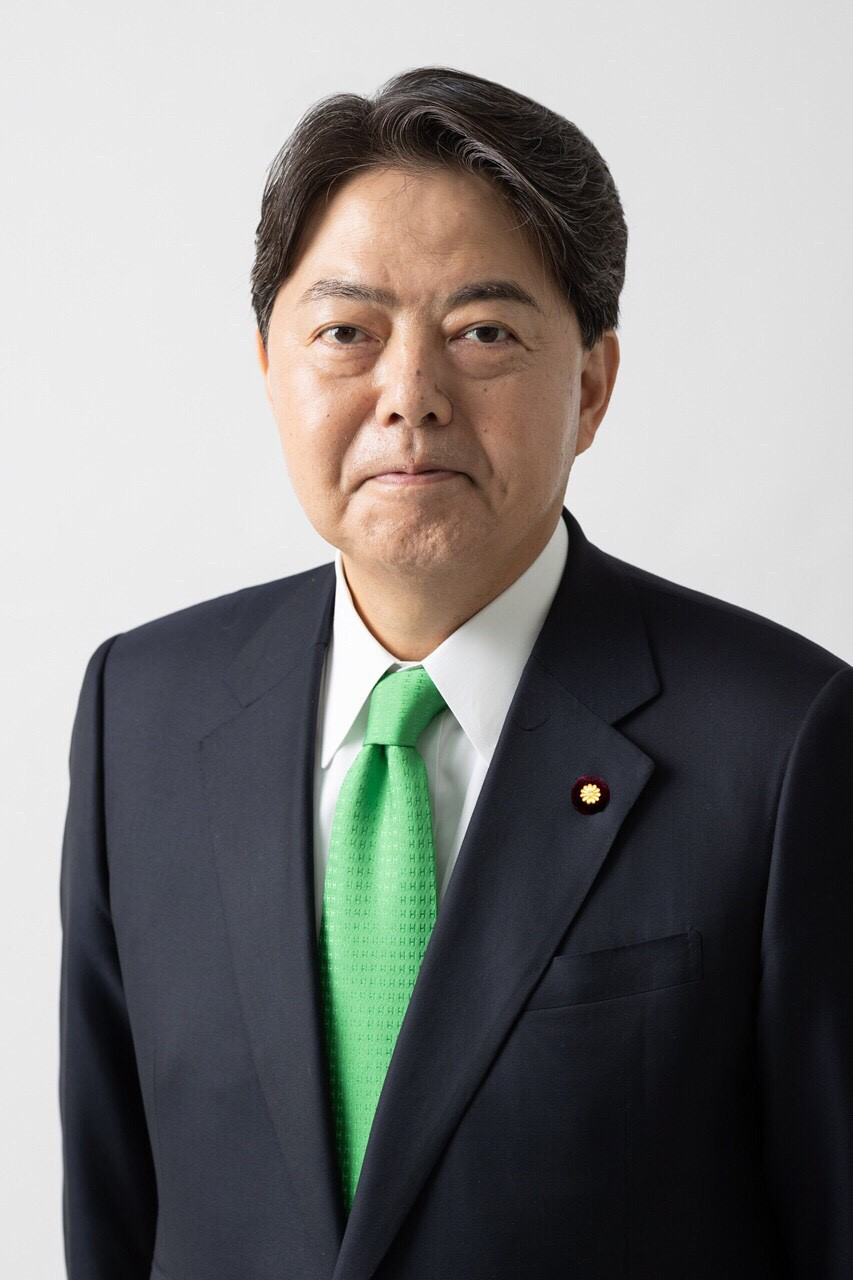
- Yoshimasa Hayashi, Japanese politician
- Pronunciation: joɕimasa (IPA)
- Gender: Male

Origin
- Origin: Japanese
- Meaning: Different meanings depending on the kanji used

Other names
- Alternative spelling: Yosimasa (Kunrei-shiki) Yosimasa (Nihon-shiki) Yoshimasa (Hepburn)

Yoshimasa is a masculine Japanese given name.

== Written forms ==
Yoshimasa can be written using many different combinations of kanji characters. Here are some examples:

- 義正, "justice, righteous"
- 義政, "justice, politics"
- 義昌, "justice, clear"
- 佳正, "skilled, righteous"
- 佳政, "skilled, politics"
- 佳雅, "skilled, elegant"
- 善正, "virtuous, righteous"
- 善政, "virtuous, politics"
- 善真, "virtuous, reality"
- 吉正, "good luck, righteous"
- 吉政, "good luck, politics"
- 吉真, "good luck, reality"
- 良正, "good, righteous"
- 良政, "good, politics"
- 良昌, "good, clear"
- 恭正, "respectful, righteous"
- 嘉正, "excellent, righteous"
- 嘉政, "excellent, politics"
- 能政, "capacity, politics"
- 喜政, "rejoice, politics"

The name can also be written in hiragana よしまさ or katakana ヨシマサ.

== Notable people with the name ==
- Yoshimasa Ashikaga (足利 義政; 1435–1490), Japanese shōgun
- Yoshimasa Fujita (藤田 芳正; born 1979), Japanese footballer
- Yoshimasa Hayashi (林 芳正; born 1961), Japanese politician
- Yoshimasa Heinouchi (平内 吉政), Japanese woodworker
- Yoshimasa Hiraike (平池 芳正), Japanese anime director
- Yoshimasa Hosoya (細谷 佳正; born 1982), Japanese voice actor
- Yoshimasa Ishibashi (石橋 義正; born 1968), Japanese artist
- Yoshimasa Kiso (木曾 義昌; 1540–1595), Japanese samurai
- Yoshimasa Kondo (近藤 芳正; born 1961), Japanese actor
- Yoshimasa Oshima (大島 義昌; 1850–1926), Japanese general
- Yoshimasa Suda (須田 芳正; born 1967), Japanese footballer
- Yoshimasa Shishiho (嗣子鵬 慶昌; 1955–2006), Japanese sumo wrestler
- Yoshimasa Sugawara (菅原 義正; born 1941), Japanese rally driver
