= Shishihō Yoshimasa =

Japanese sumo wrestler

Personal information
- Native name: 嗣子鵬 慶昌
- Born: Osamu Tanaka; August 14, 1955 Moriyama, Nagasaki, Japan
- Died: October 7, 2006 (aged 51)
- Height: 1.90 m (6 ft 3 in)
- Weight: 122 kg (269 lb; 19.2 st)

Sport
- Sport: Sumo
- Retired: May, 1987
- Heya: Nishonoseki → Taihō
- Record: 533-527-19
- Debut: January, 1971
- Highest rank: Maegashira 2 (July, 1983)
- Championships: 3 (Jūryō)
- Updated on Sep. 2012

Shishihō Yoshimasa (born Osamu Tanaka; August 14, 1955 – October 7, 2006) was a sumo wrestler from Moriyama, Nagasaki, Japan. He made his professional debut in January 1971, and became the first sekitori from Taiho stable when he reached the juryo division in July 1977. He reached the top division in September 1979. His highest rank was maegashira 2. His favourite techniques were migi-yotsu and uwatenage. Upon retirement in May 1987 he was hired by the Sumo Association as a wakaimonogashira. He left the sumo world in July 1991. He died of cancer in 2006.

== Career record ==
Shishihō Yoshimasa
Year	January Hatsu basho, Tokyo	March Haru basho, Osaka	May Natsu basho, Tokyo	July Nagoya basho, Nagoya	September Aki basho, Tokyo	November Kyūshū basho, Fukuoka
1971	(Maezumo)	East Jonokuchi #5; 4–3	East Jonidan #71; 3–4	West Jonidan #77; 4–3	East Jonidan #51; 2–5	East Jonidan #76; 4–3
1972	West Jonidan #46; 6–1–P	West Jonidan #7; 4–3	West Sandanme #78; 4–3	East Sandanme #62; 6–1	East Sandanme #26; 3–4	West Sandanme #35; 4–3
1973	East Sandanme #23; 4–3	West Sandanme #11; 4–3	West Sandanme #1; 2–5	West Sandanme #19; 4–3	East Sandanme #8; 4–3	West Makushita #56; 3–4
1974	West Sandanme #7; 3–4	West Sandanme #17; 6–1	East Makushita #47; 3–4	West Makushita #55; 4–3	East Makushita #45; 2–5	West Sandanme #3; 4–3
1975	East Makushita #52; 2–5	East Sandanme #14; 4–3	East Sandanme #4; 4–3	East Makushita #55; 4–3	East Makushita #43; 4–3	West Makushita #34; 5–2
1976	East Makushita #22; 2–5	East Makushita #38; 3–4	West Makushita #46; 4–3	East Makushita #40; 5–2	West Makushita #23; 3–4	East Makushita #28; 6–1
1977	West Makushita #11; 5–2	East Makushita #3; 4–3	East Makushita #2; 5–2	East Jūryō #11; 7–8	East Makushita #1; 2–6	West Makushita #11; 3–4
1978	West Makushita #17; 4–3	West Makushita #11; 6–1	East Makushita #1; 5–2	West Jūryō #11; 8–7	West Jūryō #9; 7–8	East Jūryō #10; 6–9
1979	East Makushita #1; 6–1–P	West Jūryō #11; 9–6	West Jūryō #5; 8–7	East Jūryō #2; 10–5–P; Champion	West Maegashira #12; 6–9	West Jūryō #2; 10–5
1980	West Maegashira #13; 9–6	West Maegashira #5; 5–10	West Maegashira #11; 5–10	West Jūryō #2; 8–7	East Jūryō #2; 9–6	East Maegashira #13; 8–7
1981	West Maegashira #9; 4–11	West Jūryō #1; 5–10	East Jūryō #7; 11–4	East Maegashira #14; 8–7	East Maegashira #10; 4–11	East Jūryō #3; 4–11
1982	East Jūryō #9; 13–2; Champion	West Maegashira #12; 8–7	West Maegashira #9; 2–13	West Jūryō #4; 9–6	East Jūryō #2; 13–2; Champion	East Maegashira #11; 7–8
1983	West Maegashira #12; 10–5	East Maegashira #4; 4–11	East Maegashira #10; 9–6	West Maegashira #2; 5–10	East Maegashira #8; 2–4–9	East Jūryō #6; 8–7
1984	West Jūryō #3; 7–8	East Jūryō #5; 8–7	West Jūryō #4; 5–7–3	West Jūryō #9; 7–8	West Jūryō #10; 8–7	East Jūryō #8; 8–7
1985	West Jūryō #6; 8–7	East Jūryō #3; 6–9	East Jūryō #7; 9–6	East Jūryō #5; 8–7	West Jūryō #4; 7–8	East Jūryō #6; 9–6
1986	East Jūryō #2; 9–6	East Maegashira #13; 3–12	West Jūryō #7; 7–8	East Jūryō #10; 5–10	East Makushita #1; 1–6	East Makushita #23; 1–6
1987	East Makushita #55; 2–5	East Sandanme #17; 1–6	East Sandanme #56; Retired; 0–0–7	x	x	x
Record given as wins–losses–absences Top division champion Top division runner-up Retired Lower divisions Non-participation Sanshō key: F=Fighting spirit; O=Outstanding performance; T=Technique Also shown: ★=Kinboshi; P=Playoff(s); Divisions: Makuuchi — Jūryō — Makushita — Sandanme — Jonidan — Jonokuchi Makuuchi ranks: Yokozuna — Ōzeki — Sekiwake — Komusubi — Maegashira

== See also ==
- Glossary of sumo terms
- List of past sumo wrestlers
- List of sumo tournament second division champions
