= Ōnohana Taketora =

Japanese sumo wrestler

Personal information
- Native name: 大乃花 武虎
- Born: Hisayoshi Ono; 23 June 1958 (age 68) Yatsushiro, Kumamoto, Japan
- Height: 1.88 m (6 ft 2 in)
- Weight: 131 kg (289 lb)

Sport
- Sport: Sumo
- Retired: September, 1990
- Heya: Taihō
- Record: 483-428-30
- Debut: March, 1974
- Highest rank: Maegashira 13 (March, 1988)
- Elder name: Onoe
- Championships: 2 (Jūryō); 1 (Makushita)
- Updated on June 25, 2020

Ōnohana Taketora (born 23 June 1958 as Hisayoshi Ono) is a former sumo wrestler from Yatsushiro, Kumamoto, Japan. He made his professional debut in March 1974 and reached the top division in March 1988. His highest rank was maegashira 13. Upon retirement from active competition he became an elder in the Japan Sumo Association, under the name Onoe. He left the Sumo Association in April 2004.

He won a third-division title in September 1983, in an eight-way playoff, defeating both future ōzeki Konishiki and future yokozuna Futahaguro.

== Career record ==
Ōnohana Taketora
| Year | January Hatsu basho, Tokyo | March Haru basho, Osaka | May Natsu basho, Tokyo | July Nagoya basho, Nagoya | September Aki basho, Tokyo | November Kyūshū basho, Fukuoka |
|---|---|---|---|---|---|---|
| 1974 | x | (Maezumo) | West Jonokuchi #3; 6–1 | West Jonidan #50; 5–2 | West Jonidan #10; 3–4 | East Jonidan #21; 0–1–6 |
| 1975 | East Jonidan #68; 6–1 | East Jonidan #19; 3–4 | West Jonidan #32; 5–2 | West Sandanme #80; 4–3 | East Sandanme #66; 3–4 | East Sandanme #78; 2–5 |
| 1976 | West Jonidan #22; 5–2 | East Sandanme #71; 4–3 | East Sandanme #56; 4–3 | West Sandanme #44; 5–2 | East Sandanme #17; 3–4 | West Sandanme #28; 3–4 |
| 1977 | East Sandanme #40; 3–4 | East Sandanme #50; 4–3 | East Sandanme #38; 4–3 | East Sandanme #22; 5–2 | East Makushita #59; 5–2 | East Makushita #41; 1–6 |
| 1978 | East Sandanme #6; 5–2 | West Makushita #39; 4–3 | West Makushita #30; 4–3 | East Makushita #22; 2–5 | West Makushita #47; 5–2 | East Makushita #26; 3–4 |
| 1979 | West Makushita #36; 3–4 | East Makushita #45; 0–3–4 | West Sandanme #28; 6–1 | East Makushita #47; 4–3 | West Makushita #35; 5–2 | East Makushita #21; 5–2 |
| 1980 | East Makushita #11; 4–3 | East Makushita #9; 3–4 | West Makushita #16; 1–6 | West Makushita #39; 5–2 | West Makushita #21; 5–2 | East Makushita #10; 3–4 |
| 1981 | West Makushita #16; 0–1–6 | West Makushita #43; 3–4 | East Makushita #53; 6–1–P | East Makushita #23; 4–3 | East Makushita #19; 5–2 | East Makushita #7; 2–5 |
| 1982 | West Makushita #23; 5–2 | East Makushita #12; 5–2 | East Makushita #5; 3–4 | West Makushita #9; 5–2 | East Makushita #3; 3–4 | East Makushita #10; 2–5 |
| 1983 | East Makushita #21; 4–3 | East Makushita #17; 6–1 | West Makushita #3; 6–1 | West Jūryō #11; 4–11 | East Makushita #8; 6–1–PPP; Champion | West Makushita #1; 5–2 |
| 1984 | East Jūryō #9; 2–3–10 | East Makushita #8; 3–4 | East Makushita #17; 4–3 | West Makushita #10; 5–2 | East Makushita #4; 3–4 | East Makushita #8; 4–3 |
| 1985 | West Makushita #4; 6–1–PP | West Jūryō #11; 5–10 | East Makushita #5; 4–3 | East Makushita #3; 4–3 | West Jūryō #13; 8–7 | West Jūryō #10; 6–9 |
| 1986 | West Jūryō #13; 10–5 | West Jūryō #5; 8–7 | West Jūryō #2; 6–9 | West Jūryō #5; 7–8 | West Jūryō #6; 2–9–4 | East Makushita #7; 5–2 |
| 1987 | East Makushita #2; 4–3 | East Makushita #1; 4–3 | West Jūryō #11; 11–4; Champion | East Jūryō #6; 7–8 | West Jūryō #9; 13–2; Champion | West Jūryō #1; 9–6 |
| 1988 | East Jūryō #1; 8–7 | West Maegashira #13; 5–10 | East Jūryō #4; 6–9 | East Jūryō #9; 8–7 | East Jūryō #8; 9–6 | East Jūryō #3; 4–11 |
| 1989 | West Jūryō #11; 9–6 | East Jūryō #8; 7–8 | West Jūryō #10; 8–7 | East Jūryō #9; 8–7 | East Jūryō #8; 8–7 | West Jūryō #7; 6–9 |
| 1990 | East Jūryō #12; 7–8 | East Jūryō #13; 9–6 | East Jūryō #8; 8–7 | East Jūryō #6; 6–9 | East Jūryō #11; Retired; 3–12 | x |
Record given as wins–losses–absences Top division champion Top division runner-up Retired Lower divisions Non-participation Sanshō key: F=Fighting spirit; O=Outstanding performance; T=Technique Also shown: ★=Kinboshi; P=Playoff(s); Divisions: Makuuchi — Jūryō — Makushita — Sandanme — Jonidan — Jonokuchi Makuuchi ranks: Yokozuna — Ōzeki — Sekiwake — Komusubi — Maegashira

== See also ==
- Glossary of sumo terms
- List of past sumo wrestlers
- List of sumo tournament second division champions
