= Ōtake stable =

Organization of sumo wrestlers

Coordinates: 35.6822°N 139.7959°E

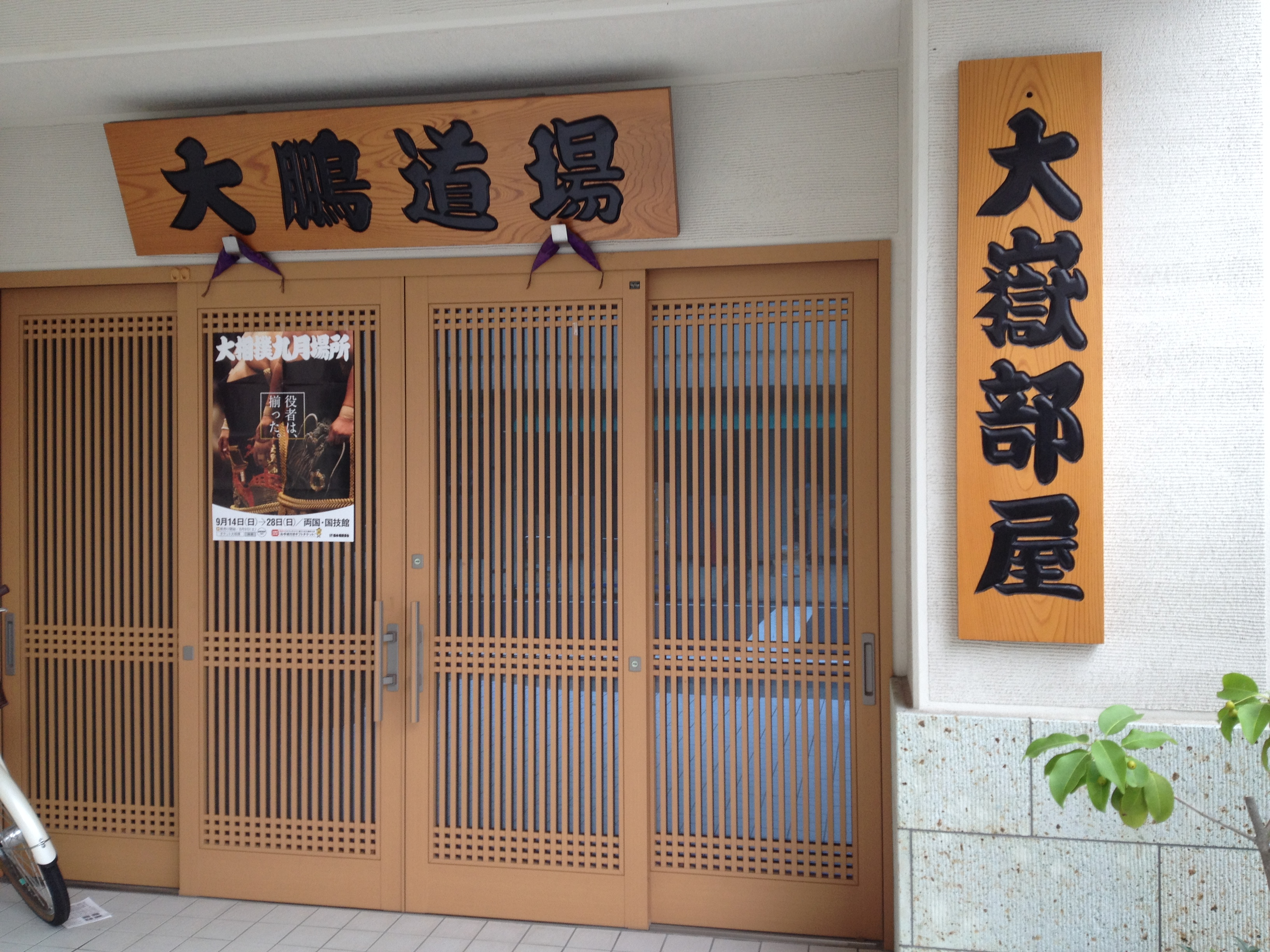
The entrance to the stable. The horizontal sign reads "Taihō-dōjō". The vertical sign reads "Ōtake-beya".

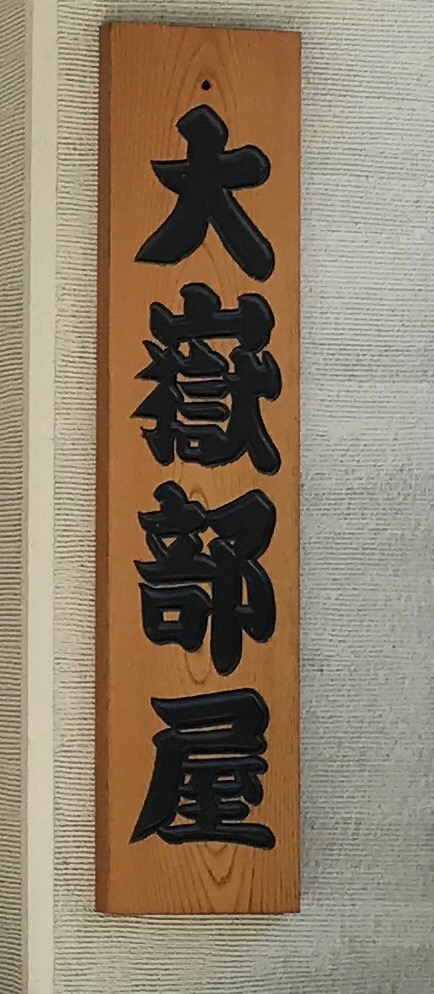

Ōtake stable (大嶽部屋, Ōtake-beya) is a stable of sumo wrestlers, part of the Nishonoseki group of stables.

As of May 2026, the stable has 9 active wrestlers.

== History ==
The stable was established in 1971 as Taihō stable by the 48th yokozuna Taihō Kōki, at the time, the most successful wrestler in the history of the sport, upon his retirement from active competition. In recognition of his sporting achievements, Taihō was allowed to retain his ring name as an elder share under the ichidai toshiyori system.

The first sekitori the stable produced was Shishihō in 1977. The most successful wrestler was Ōzutsu, who reached the rank of sekiwake. In May 1981 Taihō was persuaded by the editor of the English language sumo magazine Sumo World to accept a foreign wrestler, Philip Smoak of Texas, who was with the stable for just two months. Being largely unprepared for the reality of sumo life, Smoak resigned after only three matches in the preparatory division (maezumō).

In 2003, Taihō passed control of the stable on to his son-in-law, sekiwake Takatōriki, since he was approaching the age for mandatory retirement from the Japan Sumo Association. Taihō's memory is still as important as ever in the stable, and its training ground still displays the red tsuna that Taihō wore while performing his kanreki dohyo-iri ceremony in 2000. As the name of Taihō was an ichidai toshiyori, it could not be passed on and the stable was re-named Ōtake, after the elder share owned by Takatōriki. In 2004, the Russian Rohō reached the top division and achieved his highest rank of komusubi but he was dismissed from sumo in September 2008 after failing a test for canabis.

In January 2010 the stable, along with the Takanohana, Ōnomatsu and Magaki stables, were ejected from the Nishonoseki ichimon after Takanohana declared his intention to run as an unofficial candidate in the elections to the Sumo Association's board of directors. The ejected stables formed their own group, which gained ichimon status in 2014. In 2018 the stable joined the Nishonoseki ichimon.

In July 2010, Ōtake, the former Takatōriki, was dismissed from the Sumo Association for his involvement in a scandal over illegal betting. The stable was taken over by the former jūryō wrestler Dairyū, a former disciple of Taihō who had been working as a coach at the stable under the name Futagoyama. In 2013, the Egyptian Ōsunaarashi reached the top division in 2013 but he was forced to retire in March 2018 after being caught driving without a license.

The stable is known for always recruiting interesting profiles. One of its wrestlers, Ginseizan, is a former speed skater and another former wrestler, Tsuyukusa, a Polish-Japanese wrestler, was a former soccer player and translator. After Ōsunaarashi's retirement, the stable put a stop to recruiting foreign wrestlers.

In January 2018, a grandson of Taihō, Kōnosuke Naya, joined the stable. Naya was promoted to jūryō for the January 2021 tournament and changed his name to Ōhō. He is the second member of the stable to reach jūryō since the former Dairyū took over as head coach, following Ōsunaarashi. Another grandson of Taihō, Mudohō, joined in November 2019 and was promoted to jūryō for the May 2025 tournament. A third, Naya, joined in March 2020 but has not achieved sekitori status.

Following the September 2025 tournament, Kumagatani (maegashira Tamaasuka) will take over the Ōtake stable as its new stablemaster by swapping elder stock with the retiring former jūryō Dairyū, who will reach sumo's mandatory retirement age of 65. This transfer marks the first time in the stable's history that it will be led by a wrestler with no direct ties to its founder, Taihō.

== Ring name conventions ==
Many wrestlers at this stable take ring names or shikona that include the character for 'great' (大), which is used in the first character of the stable's name and also is in deference to the last two owners, whose former shikona also included this character. Examples of wrestlers who have incorporated this include Ōsunaarashi, Ōsuzuki, Daiseiryū and Dairyūki.

Breaking with tradition, the stable is also known for giving its wrestlers original shikona, such as Migikataagari (右肩上り; an ascending graph), or Moriurara (森麗), a name inspired by Haru Urara.

== Owners ==
- 2025–present: 18th Ōtake (iin, maegashira Tamaasuka, born 1983)
- 2010–2025: 17th Ōtake (jūryō Dairyū, born 1960)
- 2003–2010: 16th Ōtake (sekiwake Takatōriki, born 1967)
- 1971–2003: Taihō Kōki (the 48th yokozuna, Taihō, 1940–2013)

== Notable active wrestlers ==
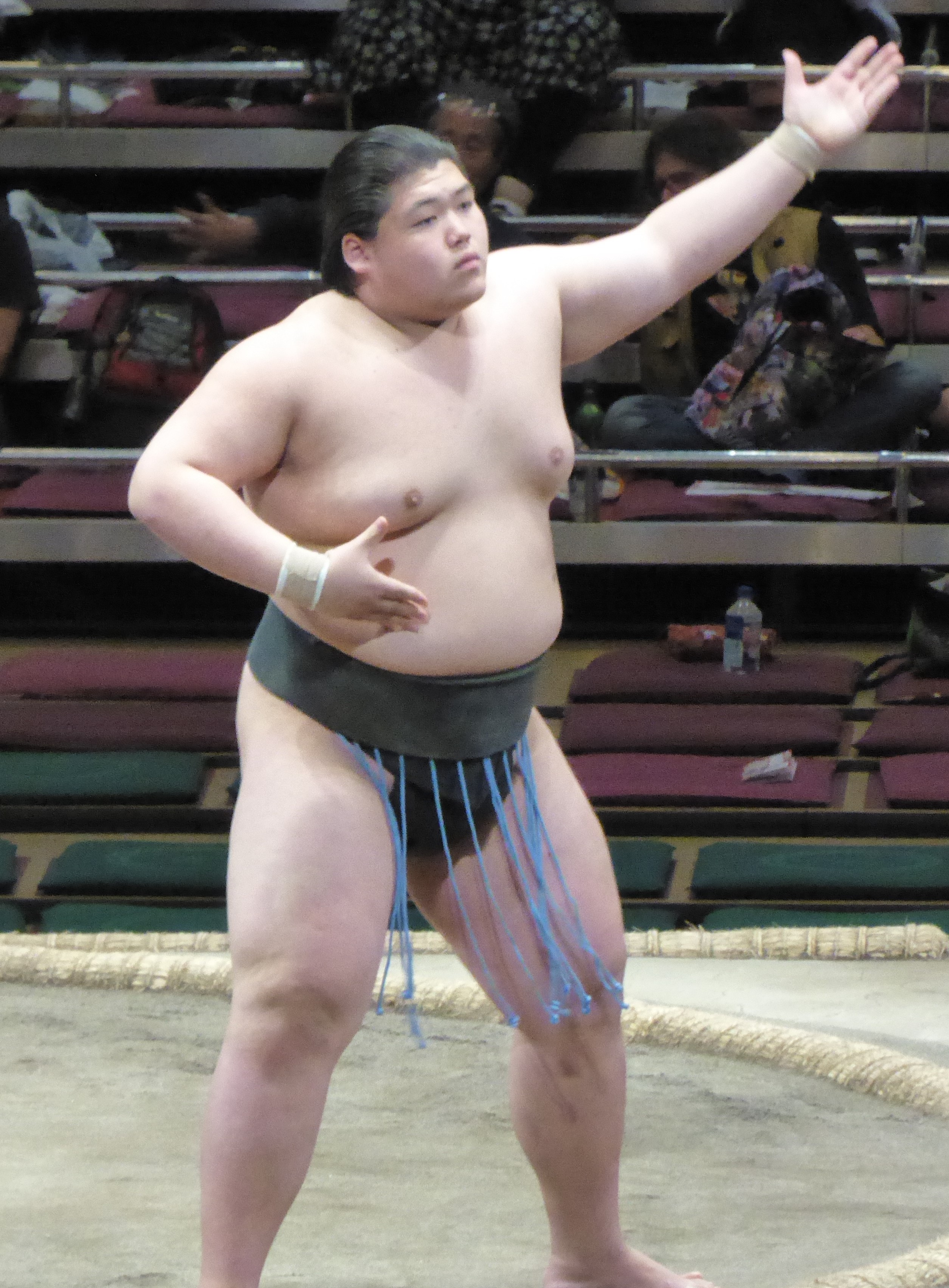
Ōhō is a grandson of the stable's founder, Taihō

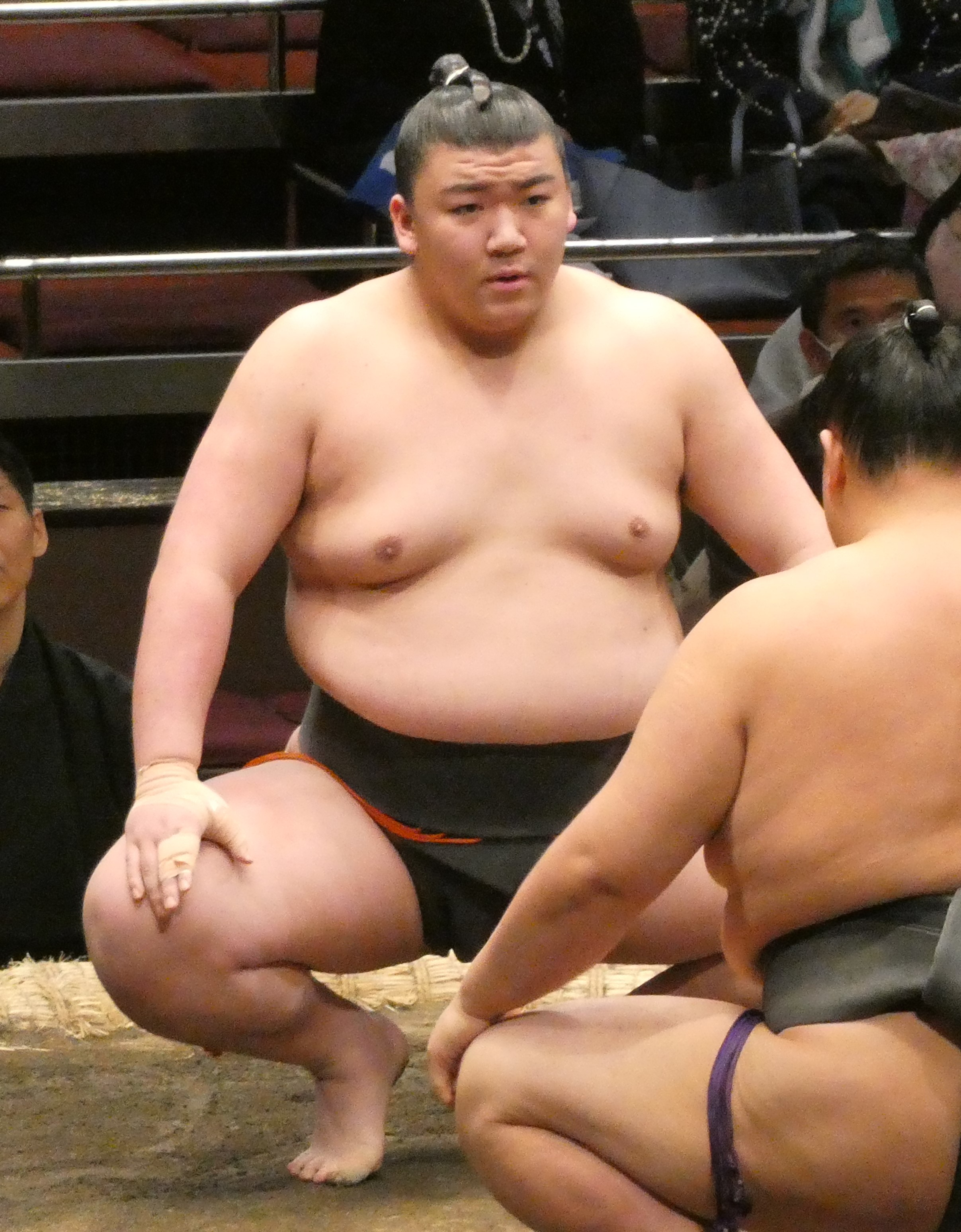
Another grandson, Mudōhō
- Ōhō (best rank sekiwake, born 2000)
- Mudōhō (best rank jūryō, born 2001)
- Naya (best rank makushita, born 1998)

== Coaches ==
- Kumagatani Tadahiro (san'yo, jūryō Dairyū, born 1960)

== Notable former members ==
- Ōzutsu (sekiwake, born 1956)
- Rohō (komusubi, born 1980)
- Ōsunaarashi (maegashira 1, born 1992)
- Shishihō (maegashira 2, 1955–2006)
- Ōnohana (maegashira 13, born 1958)
- Ōwakamatsu (maegashira 13, born 1966)

== Ushers ==
- Shirō (fuku-tate yobidashi, real name Yoshikazu Shimada, born 1962)
- Gorō (san'yaku yobidashi, real name Masaharu Akayama, born 1964)

== Hairdresser ==
- Tokonao (third class tokoyama, born 1988)

== Location and access ==
Tokyo, Kotō ward, Kiyosumi 2-8-3
3 minutes from Kiyosumi-shirakawa Station on the Toei Ōedo Line and Hanzōmon Line

== See also ==
- List of sumo stables
- List of active sumo wrestlers
- List of past sumo wrestlers
- Glossary of sumo terms
