= Taihō Kōki =

Japanese sumo wrestler (1940–2013)

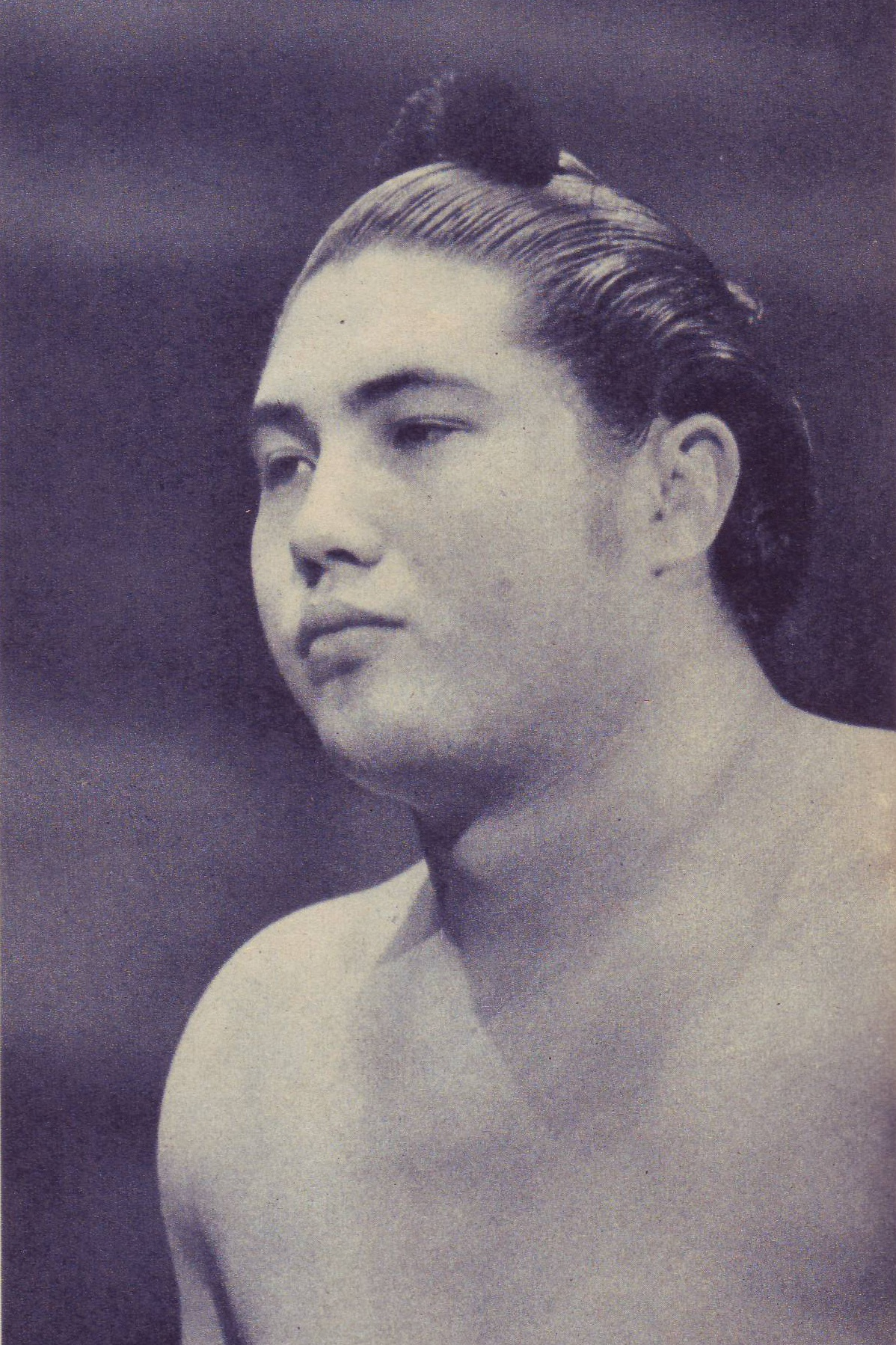
- Taihō, May 1961

Personal information
- Native name: 大鵬 幸喜
- Born: Kōki Naya; May 29, 1940 Shisuka, Karafuto, Empire of Japan
- Died: January 19, 2013 (aged 72) Shinjuku, Tokyo, Japan
- Height: 1.87 m (6 ft 1 1/2 in)
- Weight: 153 kg (337 lb; 24.1 st)

Sport
- Sport: Sumo
- Retired: May 1971
- Heya: Nishonoseki
- Record: 872-181-136
- Debut: September 1956
- Highest rank: Yokozuna (September 1961)
- Elder name: Taihō
- Championships: 32 (Makuuchi); 1 (Jūryō); 1 (Sandanme)
- Special Prizes: Fighting Spirit (2); Technique (1)
- Gold Stars: 1 (Asashio III)
- Updated on June 2020

Taihō Kōki (Japanese: 大鵬 幸喜; born Kōki Naya (納谷 幸喜, Naya Kōki), Ukrainian: Іва́н Маркіянович Бори́шко, Ivan Markiyanovych Boryshko; May 29, 1940 – January 19, 2013) was a Japanese professional sumo wrestler. He became the 48th yokozuna in 1961 at the age of 21, the youngest ever at the time.

Taihō won 32 tournament championships between 1960 and 1971, a record that was unequaled until 2014. His dominance was such that he won six tournaments in a row on two occasions, and he won 45 consecutive matches between 1968 and 1969, which at the time was the best winning streak since Futabayama in the 1930s. He is the only wrestler to win at least one championship every year of his top division career. He was a popular grand champion, especially amongst women and children. After retiring from active competition, he became a sumo coach, although health problems meant he had limited success.

Taihō was awarded the Medal with Purple Ribbon in 2004, and became the first sumo wrestler to be honored as a Person of Cultural Merit by the Japanese government in 2009. When he died in January 2013, he was widely cited as the greatest sumo wrestler of the post-war period.

== Early career ==
Taihō's birth name was Ivan Boryshko. He was born on the island of Sakhalin (Karafuto Prefecture) to a Japanese mother Kiyo Naya and an ethnic Ukrainian father Markiyan Boryshko who was born in Runivshchyna in present-day Berestyn Raion, Kharkiv Oblast and had fled the Bolshevik Revolution. However, he is regarded as having come from Teshikaga, Hokkaido, where he moved to as a child after the Soviet Union took control of Sakhalin in 1945. While on a sumo tour to the Soviet Union in 1965 he tried to locate his father without success, though he later succeeded and was allowed to reunite with him.

He entered professional sumo in September 1956, joining Nishonoseki stable at the age of 16. He initially fought under his real name of Naya Kōki. Upon promotion to the second jūryō division in May 1959 he was given the shikona (ring name) of "Taihō", meaning "Great Peng" ("peng" is often translated to "phoenix"). Taihō rapidly rose through the ranks after his debut in the top makuuchi division in January 1960. In his first tournament in the division, he recorded eleven consecutive wins from day one, a record that took 64 years to be equaled by Takerufuji. Scoring twelve victories in total, he was a runner-up in the tournament and was awarded the Fighting Spirit prize. He reached the rank of komusubi in July 1960, and sekiwake in September. In November 1960, he won his first top division tournament championship, making him the youngest champion in history at the time, at 20 years and five months. It earned him promotion to ōzeki, also the youngest ever at the time, after only one year in the top division. Following two consecutive tournament victories (his second and third) he became a yokozuna in September 1961, less than two years after his top division debut. Because the island of Sakhalin is/was claimed as a Japanese territory, Taihō is not considered the first non-Japanese yokozuna. Taihō was the first of three great yokozuna who hailed from Hokkaido, the most northerly of the main islands of Japan, who dominated sumo during the 1960s, 1970s and 1980s. The others were Kitanoumi and Chiyonofuji.

== Yokozuna ==
At the time of his promotion, Taihō was the youngest wrestler ever to achieve sumo's highest rank of yokozuna at 21 years and three months, a record subsequently surpassed by Kitanoumi. Taihō was promoted to the rank simultaneously with Kashiwado, with whom he had a rivalry since January 1960. Their rivalry created what became known as the "Haku-Hō Era" (柏鵬時代, Haku-Hō Jidai), a term coined by taking a kanji from each of their names, and boasted the popularity of sumo. Although Kashiwado only won five tournament championships in his career, their individual fight record against one another was more competitive; tied at 16, until Kashiwado lost their last five matches shortly before he retired. Taihō later remarked, "There was Taihō because there was Kashiwado. There was Kashiwado because there was Taihō." Outside of competition they had a genuine friendship, which continued until Kashiwado's death in 1996.

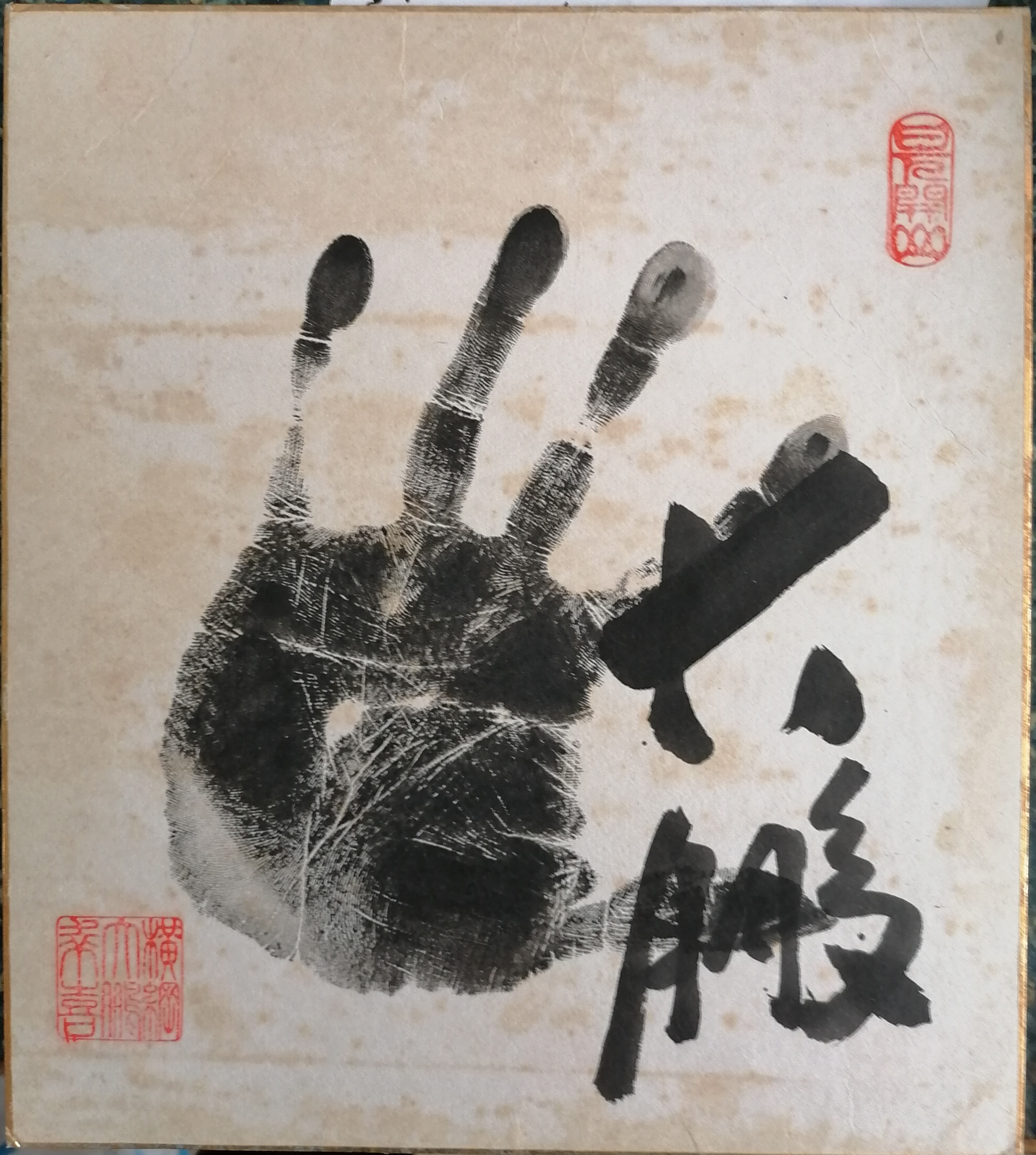
A Taihō tegata (handprint and signature)

Taihō's tenure at sumo's highest rank was dominant, especially in the early part of his career. Between July 1962 and May 1963, he became the first wrestler to win six consecutive tournament championships. This record held until 2005, when Asashōryū won seven. Eight of Taihō's championships were achieved with a perfect record of 15 wins and no losses (zenshō-yūshō), a record that stood until 2013, when it was broken by Hakuhō. In May 1964, Taiho broke Futabayama's record for most tournament championships overall when he won his thirteenth. Between March 1966 and January 1967, he once again won six consecutive championships.

After sitting out three straight tournaments due to a knee injury, Taihō came back and won the September 1968 championship with a 14–1 record and embarked on a winning streak. He won the next two tournaments with perfect records, placing him in pursuit of Futabayama's record 69 consecutive wins. However, Taihō's win streak ended at 45 in March 1969, after the judges incorrectly overturned the gyōji's decision in his match against Toda. This caused such a furor that video replays were introduced in the very next tournament.

Taihō's 32nd and final championship came in January 1971 after a playoff with Tamanoumi, maintaining his record of winning at least one championship every year of his top division career. He had a good score of 12–3 in the following March tournament; however, he announced his retirement five days into the May 1971 tournament after his second loss, which was to promising young wrestler Takanohana. Taihō said he decided to retire after seeing the young wrestlers coming up and consulting with his eldest daughter, who said "go ahead"; he acknowledged she was too young to understand and that he was therefore using her to persuade himself. Taihō had been a yokozuna for nearly ten years. His career win ratio was in excess of 80%, which is also a post-war record. He became the first former rikishi to be offered (and accept) membership of the Japan Sumo Association without having to purchase a share (ichidai toshiyori), in recognition of his great achievements.

== After retirement ==
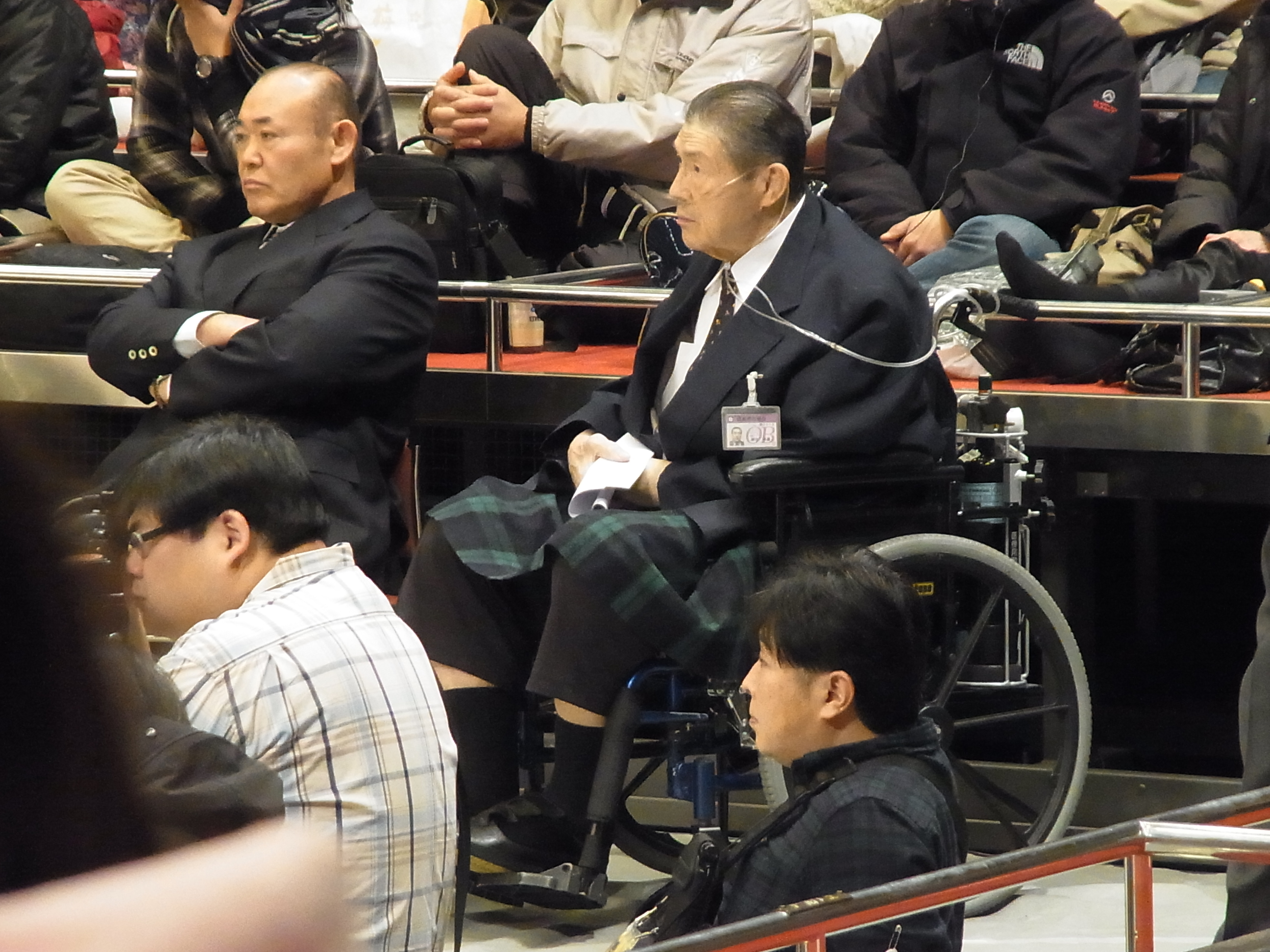
Aobajō (left) and Taihō at a Yokozuna Deliberation Council keiko sōken (December 23, 2011)

Taihō branched off from his old heya and opened Taihō stable in December 1971. In February 1977, at the age of 36, he suffered a stroke, and his subsequent health problems may have played a part in him being passed over for the chairmanship of the Sumo Association. He had extensive rehabilitation sessions to get the left side of his body moving again. In general he did not manage to replicate his own wrestling success as a trainer, but he did produce Ōzutsu, a sekiwake who fought in 78 consecutive top division tournaments from 1979 to 1992. He had his kanreki dohyō-iri ceremony to mark his 60th birthday in 2000, although his restricted mobility meant he could not perform it in full. In fact, suffering from a stroke at the age of 36, he was originally scheduled not to perform the ceremony at all, but only to pose for a commemorative photo with his tsuna tied behind him. However, he was able to complete his Unryū ring-entering style by tightly pinching the skin of his stomach with the fingers of his left hand so that his left arm, which was not free to move, would not slump down. In May 2002, Taihō recruited the Russian wrestler Rohō. He handed over control of his stable to his son-in-law, ex-sekiwake Takatōriki, in February 2003.

Taihō reached the mandatory retirement age of 65 in May 2005 and became the curator of the Sumo Museum at the Ryōgoku Kokugikan. He still maintained close contact with his old stable, inviting yokozuna Hakuhō to train there in May 2008.

Taihō was awarded the Medal with Purple Ribbon by the Japanese government in 2004. In November 2009, he was one of 15 people to receive the Person of Cultural Merit award from the Japanese government, becoming the first sumo wrestler to be so honored.

After suffering a stroke at 36 in 1977, Taihō used a wheelchair in the last stage of his life. He died of heart failure in a Tokyo hospital on January 19, 2013, at the age of 72. His death was announced by the Japan Sumo Association. In its obituary, Nikkan Sports named him "the strongest yokozuna in history." In February 2013, he posthumously became the second sumo wrestler to be commended with the People's Honour Award, with Yoshihide Suga calling him a "national hero." After winning the March 2013 championship, Hakuhō urged the crowd to get to their feet and honour Taihō's memory with a moment of silence. He said that Taihō gave him regular advice, and told him that records are meant to be broken. Hakuhō would indeed surpass Taihō's all-time championship record by winning his 33rd yushō in January 2015, two years after Taihō's death.

== Fighting style ==
Taihō was noted for his skill and power when he grabbed his opponents' mawashi or belt– techniques known as yotsu-sumo. His preferred grip was hidari-yotsu, a right hand outside, left hand inside position. His most common winning move was yorikiri, a frontal force out, which accounted for about 30 percent of his wins. His most frequently used throws were sukuinage (beltless arm throw) and uwatenage (overarm throw). Although critics said he lacked a clear winning-strategy, Taihō himself said, "If you're fixated on a style, you'll be in trouble if it's blocked. I was able to adapt to any situation. That was my approach: a natural style."

He was particularly diligent about training, and was known to invite every new member of the top division to train with him.

== Family ==
He married in 1966 at the height of his fame (coincidentally, the final day of the May Tournament that year, which he won, was also his 26th birthday), to the daughter of a ryokan proprietor. Their lavish reception at the Imperial Hotel was attended by 1000 guests and over 200 reporters. He was the first to hold a press conference afterwards, now a common occurrence with sumo marriages.

Taihō's youngest daughter married the former sekiwake Takatoriki, who took over the running of Taihō stable (renamed Ōtake stable) after Taihō's retirement. When Ōtake was dismissed from sumo after a gambling scandal, he divorced Taihō's daughter. Taihō's grandson Konosuke Naya (born 2000) joined Ōtake stable as a professional sumo wrestler in January 2018, initially fighting under the shikona Naya before switching to Ōhō. He was followed into sumo by his brothers Kosei in November 2019, with the shikona Mudōhō; and Takamori in March 2020, initially with the shikona Hozan before switching to Naya. Taihō's fourth and eldest grandson, Yukio Naya (born 1994), is a professional wrestler.

== Career record ==
- The Kyushu tournament was first held in 1957, and the Nagoya tournament in 1958.

Taihō Kōki
Year	January Hatsu basho, Tokyo	March Haru basho, Osaka	May Natsu basho, Tokyo	July Nagoya basho, Nagoya	September Aki basho, Tokyo	November Kyūshū basho, Fukuoka
1956	x	x	x	x	(Maezumo)	Not held
1957	West Jonokuchi #23; 7–1	East Jonidan #83; 6–2	West Jonidan #29; 7–1	Not held	West Sandanme #71; 7–1	East Sandanme #37; 6–2
1958	West Sandanme #20; 6–2	East Sandanme #1; 8–0–P; Champion	West Makushita #31; 7–1–P	East Makushita #9; 7–1	West Makushita #2; 3–5	East Makushita #7; 6–2
1959	East Makushita #4; 6–2	East Makushita #1; 6–2	West Jūryō #20; 9–6	East Jūryō #16; 9–6	East Jūryō #10; 13–2	East Jūryō #3; 13–2; Champion
1960	West Maegashira #13; 12–3; F	East Maegashira #4; 7–8	East Maegashira #6; 11–4; F★	West Komusubi #1; 11–4	West Sekiwake #1; 12–3; T	East Sekiwake #1; 13–2
1961	East Ōzeki #2; 10–5	West Ōzeki #2; 12–3	West Ōzeki #1; 11–4	East Ōzeki #1; 13–2	East Ōzeki #1; 12–3–PP	West Yokozuna #1; 13–2
1962	East Yokozuna #1; 13–2	East Yokozuna #1; 13–2–P	East Yokozuna #1; 11–4	East Yokozuna #1; 14–1	East Yokozuna #1; 13–2–P	East Yokozuna #1; 13–2
1963	East Yokozuna #1; 14–1	East Yokozuna #1; 14–1	East Yokozuna #1; 15–0	East Yokozuna #1; 12–3	East Yokozuna #1; 14–1	West Yokozuna #1; 12–3
1964	East Yokozuna #1; 15–0	East Yokozuna #1; 15–0	East Yokozuna #1; 10–5	East Yokozuna #2; 1–4–10	West Yokozuna #1; 14–1	East Yokozuna #1; 14–1
1965	East Yokozuna #1; 11–4	East Yokozuna #1; 14–1	East Yokozuna #1; 9–6	West Yokozuna #1; 13–2	East Yokozuna #1; 11–4	East Yokozuna #2; 13–2
1966	East Yokozuna #1; Sat out due to injury 0–0–15	East Yokozuna #2; 13–2	East Yokozuna #1; 14–1	East Yokozuna #1; 14–1	East Yokozuna #1; 13–2–P	East Yokozuna #1; 15–0
1967	East Yokozuna #1; 15–0	East Yokozuna #1; 13–2	East Yokozuna #1; 14–1	East Yokozuna #1; 2–1–12	East Yokozuna #2; 15–0	East Yokozuna #1; 11–2–2
1968	East Yokozuna #1; 1–3–11	East Yokozuna #2; Sat out due to injury 0–0–15	West Yokozuna #1; Sat out due to injury 0–0–15	West Yokozuna #1; Sat out due to injury 0–0–15	West Yokozuna #1; 14–1	East Yokozuna #1; 15–0
1969	East Yokozuna #1; 15–0	East Yokozuna #1; 3–2–10	West Yokozuna #1; 13–2	East Yokozuna #1; 11–4	East Yokozuna #1; 11–4	East Yokozuna #1; 6–4–5
1970	East Yokozuna #1; Sat out due to injury 0–0–15	East Yokozuna #2; 14–1	East Yokozuna #1; 12–3	West Yokozuna #1; 2–2–11	East Yokozuna #2; 12–3	West Yokozuna #1; 14–1–P
1971	West Yokozuna #1; 14–1–P	West Yokozuna #1; 12–3	West Yokozuna #1; Retired; 3–3	x	x	x
Record given as wins–losses–absences Top division champion Top division runner-up Retired Lower divisions Non-participation Sanshō key: F=Fighting spirit; O=Outstanding performance; T=Technique Also shown: ★=Kinboshi; P=Playoff(s); Divisions: Makuuchi — Jūryō — Makushita — Sandanme — Jonidan — Jonokuchi Makuuchi ranks: Yokozuna — Ōzeki — Sekiwake — Komusubi — Maegashira

== See also ==
- Kanreki dohyo-iri
- List of sumo record holders
- List of sumo tournament top division champions
- List of sumo tournament top division runners-up
- List of sumo tournament second division champions
- List of yokozuna
- Glossary of sumo terms
- List of past sumo wrestlers

Preceded by Kashiwado Tsuyoshi	48th Yokozuna; 1961–1971	Succeeded by Tochinoumi Teruyoshi
Yokozuna is not a successive rank, and more than one wrestler can hold the title at once
