= Dairyū Tadahiro =

Sumo wrestler

Personal information
- Native name: 大竜 忠博
- Born: Tadahiro Nagamoto; 30 September 1960 (age 66) Nishinari-ku, Osaka, Japan
- Height: 1.80 m (5 ft 11 in)
- Weight: 135 kg (298 lb)

Sport
- Sport: Sumo
- Retired: July, 1997
- Heya: Taihō
- Record: 553-508-28
- Debut: May, 1976
- Highest rank: Jūryō 4 (January, 1990)
- Elder name: Ōtake
- Updated on Sep. 2012

Dairyū Tadahiro (born 30 September 1960 as Tadahiro Nagamoto) is a former sumo wrestler from Osaka, Japan. He made his professional debut in May 1976, but never reached the top division. His highest rank was jūryō 4, which he reached in January 1990. He retired in July 1997 and became an elder in the Japan Sumo Association. He assumed the role of head coach of Ōtake stable in July 2010, shortly after former head coach (ex-sekiwake) Takatōriki was fired by the Sumo Association for betting illegally on baseball.

== Career record ==
Dairyū Tadahiro
Year	January Hatsu basho, Tokyo	March Haru basho, Osaka	May Natsu basho, Tokyo	July Nagoya basho, Nagoya	September Aki basho, Tokyo	November Kyūshū basho, Fukuoka
1976	x	x	(Maezumo)	West Jonokuchi #15; 3–4	East Jonokuchi #9; 5–2	West Jonidan #86; 4–3
1977	East Jonidan #58; 4–3	West Jonidan #32; 2–5	West Jonidan #61; Sat out due to injury 0–0–7	West Jonidan #106; 6–1	East Jonidan #43; 4–3	West Jonidan #19; 3–4
1978	East Jonidan #32; 5–2	West Sandanme #81; 4–3	West Sandanme #61; 5–2	East Sandanme #34; 2–5	East Sandanme #59; 5–2	East Sandanme #29; 4–3
1979	East Sandanme #19; 3–4	West Sandanme #34; 2–5	East Sandanme #63; 7–0–P	East Makushita #58; 2–5	West Sandanme #22; 5–2	West Makushita #60; 5–2
1980	West Makushita #38; 3–4	West Makushita #48; 3–4	West Sandanme #3; 4–3	West Makushita #55; 3–4	East Sandanme #8; 2–5	West Sandanme #29; 4–3
1981	East Sandanme #14; 4–3	West Sandanme #2; 4–3	East Makushita #49; 3–4	East Makushita #56; Sat out due to injury 0–0–7	East Sandanme #31; 4–3	West Sandanme #20; 5–2
1982	West Makushita #56; 3–4	West Sandanme #8; 6–1	West Makushita #33; 2–5	East Makushita #57; 4–3	East Makushita #46; 3–4	West Sandanme #1; 5–2
1983	East Makushita #39; 5–2	West Makushita #24; 3–4	East Makushita #38; 4–3	East Makushita #29; 5–2	West Makushita #14; 4–3	West Makushita #9; 3–4
1984	East Makushita #18; 3–4	West Makushita #30; 3–4	East Makushita #43; 5–2	West Makushita #24; 5–2	West Makushita #14; 3–4	West Makushita #22; 4–3
1985	East Makushita #16; 5–2	East Makushita #7; 2–5	West Makushita #27; 6–1	East Makushita #11; 3–4	West Makushita #18; 4–3	West Makushita #11; 4–3
1986	East Makushita #7; 3–4	East Makushita #14; 4–3	East Makushita #9; 2–5	West Makushita #25; 4–3	West Makushita #16; 3–4	West Makushita #20; 4–3
1987	East Makushita #14; 2–5	East Makushita #32; 6–1–PP	East Makushita #14; 4–3	West Makushita #9; 4–3	West Makushita #4; 3–4	East Makushita #8; 5–2
1988	West Makushita #2; 5–2	West Jūryō #11; 8–7	East Jūryō #9; 8–7	East Jūryō #6; 6–9	East Jūryō #11; 9–6	West Jūryō #6; 6–9
1989	East Jūryō #11; 8–7	West Jūryō #10; 8–7	East Jūryō #8; 6–9	East Jūryō #12; 6–9	West Makushita #1; 5–2	East Jūryō #11; 9–6
1990	East Jūryō #4; 6–9	West Jūryō #7; 7–8	East Jūryō #9; 9–6	West Jūryō #4; 5–10	West Jūryō #11; 6–9	East Makushita #2; 2–5
1991	West Makushita #13; 2–5	West Makushita #28; 4–3	West Makushita #22; 4–3	West Makushita #14; 4–3	West Makushita #10; 3–4	West Makushita #16; 5–2
1992	West Makushita #8; 3–4	West Makushita #15; 4–3	East Makushita #12; 3–4	West Makushita #16; 3–4	West Makushita #23; 5–2	West Makushita #12; 4–3
1993	East Makushita #7; 5–2	West Makushita #2; 5–2	East Jūryō #12; 6–9	West Makushita #2; 2–5	West Makushita #16; 4–3	East Makushita #13; 4–3
1994	West Makushita #8; 4–3	West Makushita #4; 6–1	West Jūryō #11; 8–7	West Jūryō #9; 8–7	East Jūryō #7; 8–7	East Jūryō #4; 6–9
1995	West Jūryō #9; 8–7	East Jūryō #8; 8–7	West Jūryō #6; 3–5–7	East Makushita #2; Sat out due to injury 0–0–7	East Makushita #2; 5–2	West Jūryō #12; 5–10
1996	East Makushita #4; 2–5	West Makushita #17; 6–1	East Makushita #4; 6–1	East Jūryō #13; 6–9	East Makushita #4; 2–5	West Makushita #12; 5–2
1997	West Makushita #4; 2–5	East Makushita #15; 2–5	West Makushita #29; 4–3	West Makushita #21; Retired; 3–4	x	x
Record given as wins–losses–absences Top division champion Top division runner-up Retired Lower divisions Non-participation Sanshō key: F=Fighting spirit; O=Outstanding performance; T=Technique Also shown: ★=Kinboshi; P=Playoff(s); Divisions: Makuuchi — Jūryō — Makushita — Sandanme — Jonidan — Jonokuchi Makuuchi ranks: Yokozuna — Ōzeki — Sekiwake — Komusubi — Maegashira

== See also ==
- Glossary of sumo terms
- List of past sumo wrestlers
- List of sumo elders
