= 1987 in sumo =

The following are the events in professional sumo during 1987.

== Tournaments ==
- Hatsu basho, Ryōgoku Kokugikan, Tokyo, 11 – 25 January
- Haru basho, Osaka Prefectural Gymnasium, Osaka, 8 – 22 March
- Natsu basho, Ryōgoku Kokugikan, Tokyo, 10 – 24 May
- Nagoya basho, Aichi Prefectural Gymnasium, Nagoya, 5 – 19 July
- Aki basho, Ryōgoku Kokugikan, Tokyo, 13 – 27 September
- Kyushu basho, Fukuoka International Center, Kyushu, 6 – 20 November

== News ==
=== January ===
- 25: Chiyonofuji wins his twentieth yūshō, becoming the third man after Taihō and Kitanoumi to reach this landmark. He defeats fellow yokozuna Futahaguro in a playoff after both men finish on 12–3. Futahaguro had beaten Chiyonofuji in their regulation match but could not do so a second time. Although this is his sixth runner-up performance, his first top division championship continues to elude him. Sekiwake Konishiki scores 10–5 and wins the Outstanding Performance prize for his wins over both yokozuna. Masurao wins the Technique Award. Former komusubi Ōyutaka, who lost sekitori status in 1985, announces his retirement. He assumes the Arashio toshiyori or elder name and stays on as a coach at his stable.

=== March ===
- 22: Ōzeki Hokutoumi wins his second championship with a score of 12–3, finishing one win ahead of stablemate Chiyonofuji and Konishiki on 11–4. New komusubi Masurao has a superb tournament, defeating two yokozuna and four ōzeki in the first seven days and is awarded the Outstanding Performance prize. Hananoumi wins the Technique prize and Tochinowaka the Fighting Spirit Award. Futahaguro drops out on the tenth day. In jūryō Takamisugi wins the yūshō while Kaiki announces his retirement. He stays in sumo as Takashima Oyakata.

=== May ===
- 24: Ōzeki Onokuni wins his first yūshō with a perfect 15–0 record. He is the first man other than Chiyonofuji to win in the Ryōgoku Kokugikan, which opened over two years before in January 1985. Runner-up is Hokutoumi on 13–2, who is promoted to yokozuna after the tournament. Kokonoe stable becomes the first since Takasago in 1949 to have two active yokozuna simultaneously. Konishiki is also promoted to ōzeki after a fine 12–3 score, becoming the first foreigner ever to reach sumo's second highest rank. He wins the Fighting Spirit prize while the other sekiwake Asahifuji gets the Technique prize. Masurao has another giant-killing tournament and wins another Outstanding Performance prize. The jūryō yūshō is won by Onohana; the makushita championship by Akinoshima. Former sekiwake Kaneshiro (also known as Tochihikari) retires rather than face demotion to makushita. Unable to obtain elder stock, he leaves the sumo world.

=== July ===
- 19: After an unremarkable 10–5 last time out, Chiyonofuji wins the yūshō in style with a 14–1 record. Ōnokuni turns in another good performance, finishing runner-up on 12–3. New yokozuna Hokutoumi wins eleven bouts and new ōzeki Konishiki is on 9–6. Futahaguro can manage only 8–7. Ōzeki Wakashimazu retires, leaving Futagoyama stable without anyone in san'yaku for the first time in 15 years. Also announcing his retirement is Hattori (also known as Fujinokawa), a former amateur champion who was plagued by injuries in his four years as a professional. Special prizes are awarded to Asahifuji for Technique, Tochinowaka for Outstanding Performance and Dewanohana for Fighting Spirit. Veteran former sekiwake Masudayama wins the jūryō championship.

=== September ===
- 27: Hokutoumi wins his first championship as a yokozuna with a 14–1 record. His only defeat is to Ōnokuni, whose 13–2 runner-up performance earns him promotion to yokozuna as well. Asahifuji is simultaneously promoted to ōzeki after scoring 12–3 and winning Technique and Fighting Spirit prizes. Konishiki also finishes in third on 12–3. Sakahoko is awarded the Outstanding Performance prize for his defeat of Chiyonofuji on Day 6. (Chiyonofuji later withdrew from the tournament because of injury.) The lightweight jūryō veteran Hachiya retires and becomes Onogawa Oyakata.

=== November ===
- 22: Chiyonofuji returns from injury to win his 22nd yūshō with a perfect 15–0 record (his fourth). Futahaguro has his best performance for some time, finishing runner-up on 13–2 alongside Hokutoumi. Ōnokuni can manage only 8–7 in his yokozuna debut. Sakahoko wins his second Outstanding Performance prize in a row — he had defeated two ōzeki and a yokozuna in the first three days. Tochitsukasa receives the Technique award. Nankairyu from Western Samoa, only the third non-Japanese to reach the top division, scores 8–7 on his debut in makuuchi. Former sekiwake Hō'ō wins the jūryō division yūshō for the fourth time.

=== December ===
- 31: Futahaguro is forced to retire by the Sumo Association after a heated argument with his stablemaster (former sekiwake Haguroyama) four days earlier led to him storming out of the stable, allegedly slapping his boss's wife on the way. He becomes the first yokozuna ever to be forced out of the sumo world.

== Deaths ==
- 27 September: Kataonami Oyakata (former sekiwake Tamanoumi Daitaro), aged 64.

== See also ==
- Glossary of sumo terms
- List of past sumo wrestlers
- List of years in sumo
- List of yokozuna
