= 2020 in sumo =

The following are the events in professional sumo during 2020.

== Tournaments ==
=== January ===
Hatsu basho

Ryōgoku Kokugikan, Tokyo, 12 January – 26 January

2020 Hatsu basho results - Makuuchi Division
W		L		A	East			Rank	West			W		L		A
1	-	3	-	11	ø	(Mongolia)	Hakuhō	Y	ø	(Mongolia)	Kakuryū	1	-	4	-	10
11	-	4	-	0		(Japan)	**Takakeishō**	O		(Japan)	Gōeidō	5	-	10	-	0
10	-	5	-	0		(Japan)	**Asanoyama**	S		(Japan)	Takayasu	6	-	9	-	0
5	-	10	-	0		(Japan)	Abi	K		(Japan)	Daieishō	7	-	8	-	0
9	-	6	-	0		(Japan)	**Endō**	M1		(Japan)	Myōgiryū	5	-	10	-	0
11	-	4	-	0		(Japan)	**Hokutofuji**	M2		(Japan)	Mitakeumi	7	-	8	-	0
5	-	10	-	0		(Mongolia)	Tamawashi	M3	ø	(Japan)	Kotoyūki	0	-	0	-	15
8	-	7	-	0		(Japan)	**Okinoumi**	M4		(Japan)	**Shōdai**	13	-	2	-	0
1	-	7	-	7	ø	(Japan)	Meisei	M5		(Japan)	**Enhō**	8	-	7	-	0
7	-	8	-	0		(Japan)	Takarafuji	M6		(Georgia (country))	Tochinoshin	5	-	10	-	0
7	-	8	-	0		(Japan)	Shōhōzan	M7		(Japan)	**Ōnoshō**	9	-	6	-	0
4	-	11	-	0		(Bulgaria)	Aoiyama	M8		(Japan)	**Ryūden**	10	-	5	-	0
7	-	8	-	0		(Japan)	Takanoshō	M9		(Japan)	**Yutakayama**	11	-	4	-	0
7	-	8	-	0		(Japan)	Sadanoumi	M10		(Japan)	Ishiura	6	-	9	-	0
7	-	8	-	0		(Japan)	Chiyotairyū	M11		(Japan)	**Kagayaki**	10	-	5	-	0
6	-	9	-	0		(Japan)	Tsurugishō	M12		(Japan)	Chiyomaru	6	-	9	-	0
7	-	8	-	0		(Japan)	Kotoshōgiku	M13		(Japan)	Kotoekō	2	-	13	-	0
8	-	7	-	0		(Japan)	**Terutsuyoshi**	M14		(Japan)	Shimanoumi	6	-	9	-	0
7	-	8	-	0		(Mongolia)	Azumaryū	M15		(Japan)	**Ikioi**	8	-	7	-	0
9	-	6	-	0		(Japan)	**Tochiōzan**	M16		(Brazil)	**Kaisei**	8	-	7	-	0
11	-	4	-	0		(Mongolia)	**Kiribayama**	M17		(Japan)	**Tokushōryū**	14	-	1	-	0

ø - Indicates a pull-out or absent rank
**winning record in bold**
**Yusho Winner**

=== March ===
Haru basho

Osaka Prefectural Gymnasium, Osaka, 8 March – 22 March

2020 Haru basho results - Makuuchi Division
W		L		A	East			Rank	West			W		L		A
13	-	2	-	0		(Mongolia)	**Hakuhō**	Y		(Mongolia)	**Kakuryū**	12	-	3	-	0
7	-	8	-	0		(Japan)	Takakeishō	O	ø			0	-	0	-	0
11	-	4	-	0		(Japan)	**Asanoyama**	S		(Japan)	**Shōdai**	8	-	7	-	0
4	-	11	-	0		(Japan)	Hokutofuji	K		(Japan)	Endō	7	-	8	-	0
8	-	7	-	0		(Japan)	**Daieishō**	M1	ø	(Japan)	Takayasu	0	-	5	-	10
8	-	7	-	0		(Japan)	**Okinoumi**	M2		(Japan)	Tokushōryū	4	-	11	-	0
8	-	7	-	0		(Japan)	**Yutakayama**	M3		(Japan)	**Mitakeumi**	10	-	5	-	0
6	-	9	-	0		(Japan)	Enhō	M4		(Japan)	Abi	7	-	8	-	0
6	-	9	-	0		(Japan)	Ryūden	M5		(Japan)	**Ōnoshō**	9	-	6	-	0
4	-	11	-	0		(Japan)	Myōgiryū	M6		(Japan)	**Kagayaki**	8	-	7	-	0
9	-	6	-	0		(Japan)	**Takarafuji**	M7		(Mongolia)	Tamawashi	6	-	9	-	0
4	-	11	-	0		(Japan)	Shōhōzan	M8		(Mongolia)	**Kiribayama**	9	-	6	-	0
12	-	3	-	0		(Japan)	**Takanoshō**	M9		(Georgia (country))	Tochinoshin	6	-	9	-	0
6	-	9	-	0		(Japan)	Sadanoumi	M10		(Japan)	Tochiōzan	3	-	12	-	0
8	-	7	-	0		(Japan)	**Chiyotairyū**	M11		(Japan)	**Terutsuyoshi**	9	-	6	-	0
9	-	6	-	0		(Japan)	**Ishiura**	M12		(Japan)	**Ikioi**	8	-	7	-	0
7	-	8	-	0		(Japan)	Kotoshōgiku	M13		(Bulgaria)	**Aoiyama**	11	-	4	-	0
8	-	7	-	0		(Brazil)	**Kaisei**	M14		(Japan)	Nishikigi	6	-	9	-	0
1	-	4	-	10	ø	(Japan)	Tsurugishō	M15		(Japan)	Chiyomaru	7	-	6	-	2
5	-	10	-	0		(Mongolia)	Azumaryū	M16		(Japan)	**Shimanoumi**	9	-	6	-	0
7	-	8	-	0		(Japan)	Meisei	M17		(Japan)	Daiamami	5	-	10	-	0
9	-	6	-	0		(Japan)	**Kotonowaka**	M18	ø			0	-	0	-	0

ø - Indicates a pull-out or absent rank
**winning record in bold**
**Yusho Winner**

=== May ===
Natsu basho - Cancelled

Originally scheduled to be held on 10–24 May at the Ryōgoku Kokugikan in Tokyo, the tournament was cancelled due to COVID-19 following Japan's state of emergency in April.

=== July ===
Nagoya basho

Ryōgoku Kokugikan, Tokyo, 19 July – 2 August

Originally scheduled to take place at Aichi Prefectural Gymnasium in Nagoya on 5–19 July due to avoid scheduling conflict with the 2020 Summer Olympics, the tournament was moved to Tokyo by the Sumo Association due to the coronavirus pandemic. The tournament was limited to 2,500 spectators per day, which is less than one-fourth of the Kokugikan's capacity. The banzuke originally issued for the cancelled Natsu basho was used.

2020 Nagoya basho results - Makuuchi Division
W		L		A	East			Rank	West			W		L		A
10	-	3	-	2	ø	(Mongolia)	**Hakuhō**	Y	ø	(Mongolia)	Kakuryū	0	-	2	-	13
8	-	4	-	3	ø	(Japan)	**Takakeishō**	O		(Japan)	**Asanoyama**	12	-	3	-	0
11	-	4	-	0		(Japan)	**Shōdai**	S		(Japan)	**Mitakeumi**	11	-	4	-	0
11	-	4	-	0		(Japan)	**Daieishō**	K		(Japan)	**Okinoumi**	9	-	6	-	0
8	-	7	-	0		(Japan)	**Endō**	M1		(Japan)	Yutakayama	5	-	10	-	0
8	-	7	-	0		(Japan)	**Takanoshō**	M2		(Japan)	Ōnoshō	2	-	13	-	0
5	-	10	-	0		(Japan)	Takarafuji	M3		(Mongolia)	Kiribayama	6	-	9	-	0
5	-	10	-	0		(Japan)	Kagayaki	M4		(Bulgaria)	Aoiyama	5	-	10	-	0
3	-	4	-	8	ø	(Japan)	Abi	M5		(Japan)	**Hokutofuji**	9	-	6	-	0
5	-	10	-	0		(Japan)	Enhō	M6		(Japan)	Ryūden	7	-	8	-	0
8	-	7	-	0		(Japan)	**Terutsuyoshi**	M7		(Japan)	Tokushōryū	7	-	8	-	0
4	-	11	-	0		(Japan)	Ishiura	M8		(Japan)	Chiyotairyū	6	-	9	-	0
10	-	5	-	0		(Mongolia)	**Tamawashi**	M9		(Japan)	Ikioi	3	-	12	-	0
6	-	9	-	0		(Brazil)	Kaisei	M10		(Japan)	**Myōgiryū**	10	-	5	-	0
5	-	10	-	0		(Japan)	Shimanoumi	M11		(Georgia (country))	**Tochinoshin**	10	-	5	-	0
8	-	7	-	0		(Japan)	**Sadanoumi**	M12		(Japan)	Shōhōzan	5	-	10	-	0
10	-	5	-	0		(Japan)	**Takayasu**	M13		(Japan)	Kotonowaka	4	-	6	-	5
8	-	7	-	0		(Japan)	**Kotoshōgiku**	M14		(Japan)	**Wakatakakage**	10	-	5	-	0
8	-	7	-	0		(Japan)	**Kotoshōhō**	M15		(Japan)	Chiyomaru	4	-	11	-	0
6	-	9	-	0		(Japan)	Nishikigi	M16		(Japan)	**Kotoekō**	10	-	5	-	0
13	-	2	-	0		(Mongolia)	**Terunofuji**	M17	ø	(Japan)	Kotoyūki	6	-	8	-	1

ø - Indicates a pull-out or absent rank
**winning record in bold**
**Yusho Winner**

=== August ===
Olympic exhibition - Cancelled

Ryōgoku Kokugikan, Tokyo, 12 August – 13 August – cancelled

=== September ===
Aki basho

Ryōgoku Kokugikan, Tokyo, 13 September – 27 September

2020 Aki basho results - Makuuchi Division
W		L		A	East			Rank	West			W		L		A
0	-	0	-	15	ø	(Mongolia)	Hakuhō	Y	ø	(Mongolia)	Kakuryū	0	-	0	-	15
10	-	5	-	0		(Japan)	**Asanoyama**	O		(Japan)	**Takakeishō**	12	-	3	-	0
13	-	2	-	0		(Japan)	**Shōdai**	S		(Japan)	**Mitakeumi**	8	-	7	-	0
5	-	10	-	0		(Japan)	Daieishō	S	ø			0	-	0	-	0
4	-	11	-	0		(Japan)	Okinoumi	K	ø	(Japan)	Endō	3	-	9	-	3
8	-	5	-	2	ø	(Mongolia)	**Terunofuji**	M1		(Japan)	**Takanoshō**	10	-	5	-	0
6	-	9	-	0		(Japan)	Hokutofuji	M2		(Mongolia)	Tamawashi	5	-	10	-	0
6	-	9	-	0		(Japan)	Myōgiryū	M3		(Japan)	Terutsuyoshi	5	-	10	-	0
2	-	5	-	8	ø	(Japan)	Yutakayama	M4		(Georgia (country))	Tochinoshin	6	-	9	-	0
9	-	4	-	2		(Mongolia)	**Kiribayama**	M5		(Japan)	Takarafuji	7	-	8	-	0
10	-	5	-	0		(Japan)	**Takayasu**	M6		(Japan)	**Kagayaki**	8	-	7	-	0
6	-	9	-	0		(Japan)	Ryūden	M7		(Bulgaria)	Aoiyama	7	-	8	-	0
7	-	8	-	0		(Japan)	Tokushōryū	M8		(Japan)	**Wakatakakage**	11	-	4	-	0
6	-	9	-	0		(Japan)	Enhō	M9		(Japan)	**Ōnoshō**	10	-	5	-	0
7	-	8	-	0		(Japan)	Sadanoumi	M10		(Japan)	**Kotoekō**	8	-	7	-	0
5	-	8	-	2	ø	(Japan)	Chiyotairyū	M11		(Japan)	Kotoshōgiku	2	-	10	-	3
10	-	5	-	0		(Japan)	**Kotoshōhō**	M12		(Brazil)	Kaisei	7	-	8	-	0
9	-	6	-	0		(Japan)	**Meisei**	M13		(Japan)	Ishiura	4	-	4	-	7
11	-	4	-	0		(Japan)	**Tobizaru**	M14	ø	(Japan)	Abi	0	-	0	-	15
6	-	9	-	0		(Japan)	Shimanoumi	M15		(Japan)	Shōhōzan	5	-	10	-	0
2	-	2	-	11	ø	(Japan)	Kyokutaisei	M16		(Mongolia)	**Hōshōryū**	8	-	7	-	0
8	-	7	-	0		(Mongolia)	**Ichinojō**	M17	ø			0	-	0	-	0

ø - Indicates a pull-out or absent rank
**winning record in bold**
**Yusho Winner**

=== November ===
Kyushu basho

Ryōgoku Kokugikan, Tokyo, 8 November – 22 November

Originally scheduled to be held at the Fukuoka Kokusai Center in Kyushu, the Sumo Association moved the tournament to Tokyo due to the coronavirus pandemic.

2020 Kyushu basho results - Makuuchi Division
W		L		A	East			Rank	West			W		L		A
0	-	0	-	15	ø	(Mongolia)	Hakuhō	Y	ø	(Mongolia)	Kakuryū	0	-	0	-	15
13	-	2	-	0		(Japan)	**Takakeishō**	O	ø	(Japan)	Asanoyama	1	-	2	-	12
3	-	2	-	10		(Japan)	Shōdai	O	ø			0	-	0	-	0
7	-	8	-	0		(Japan)	Mitakeumi	S		(Japan)	**Takanoshō**	8	-	7	-	0
13	-	2	-	0		(Mongolia)	**Terunofuji**	K		(Japan)	**Takayasu**	8	-	7	-	0
3	-	12	-	0		(Mongolia)	Kiribayama	M1		(Japan)	Wakatakakage	7	-	8	-	0
7	-	8	-	0		(Japan)	Ōnoshō	M2		(Japan)	**Daieishō**	10	-	5	-	0
5	-	10	-	0		(Japan)	Kagayaki	M3		(Japan)	Okinoumi	6	-	9	-	0
11	-	4	-	0		(Japan)	**Hokutofuji**	M4		(Japan)	Tobizaru	6	-	9	-	0
4	-	11	-	0		(Japan)	Myōgiryū	M5		(Japan)	**Kotoshōhō**	8	-	7	-	0
9	-	6	-	0		(Japan)	**Takarafuji**	M6		(Mongolia)	**Tamawashi**	8	-	7	-	0
9	-	6	-	0		(Georgia (country))	**Tochinoshin**	M7		(Japan)	**Endō**	8	-	7	-	0
6	-	9	-	0		(Bulgaria)	Aoiyama	M8		(Japan)	Terutsuyoshi	5	-	10	-	0
8	-	7	-	0		(Japan)	**Tokushōryū**	M9		(Japan)	Kotoekō	6	-	9	-	0
9	-	6	-	0		(Japan)	**Ryūden**	M10		(Japan)	**Meisei**	9	-	6	-	0
5	-	10	-	0		(Japan)	Sadanoumi	M11		(Japan)	Enhō	3	-	12	-	0
6	-	9	-	0		(Japan)	Yutakayama	M12		(Brazil)	Kaisei	6	-	9	-	0
7	-	8	-	0		(Mongolia)	Hōshōryū	M13		(Mongolia)	**Ichinojō**	8	-	7	-	0
10	-	5	-	0		(Japan)	**Chiyonokuni**	M14		(Japan)	Kotonowaka	7	-	8	-	0
9	-	6	-	0		(Japan)	**Chiyotairyū**	M15	ø	(Japan)	Kotoyūki	0	-	0	-	15
8	-	7	-	0		(Mongolia)	**Chiyoshōma**	M16		(Japan)	**Akua**	9	-	6	-	0
11	-	4	-	0		(Japan)	**Shimanoumi**	M17	ø			0	-	0	-	0

ø - Indicates a pull-out or absent rank
**winning record in bold**
**Yusho Winner**

== News ==
=== January ===
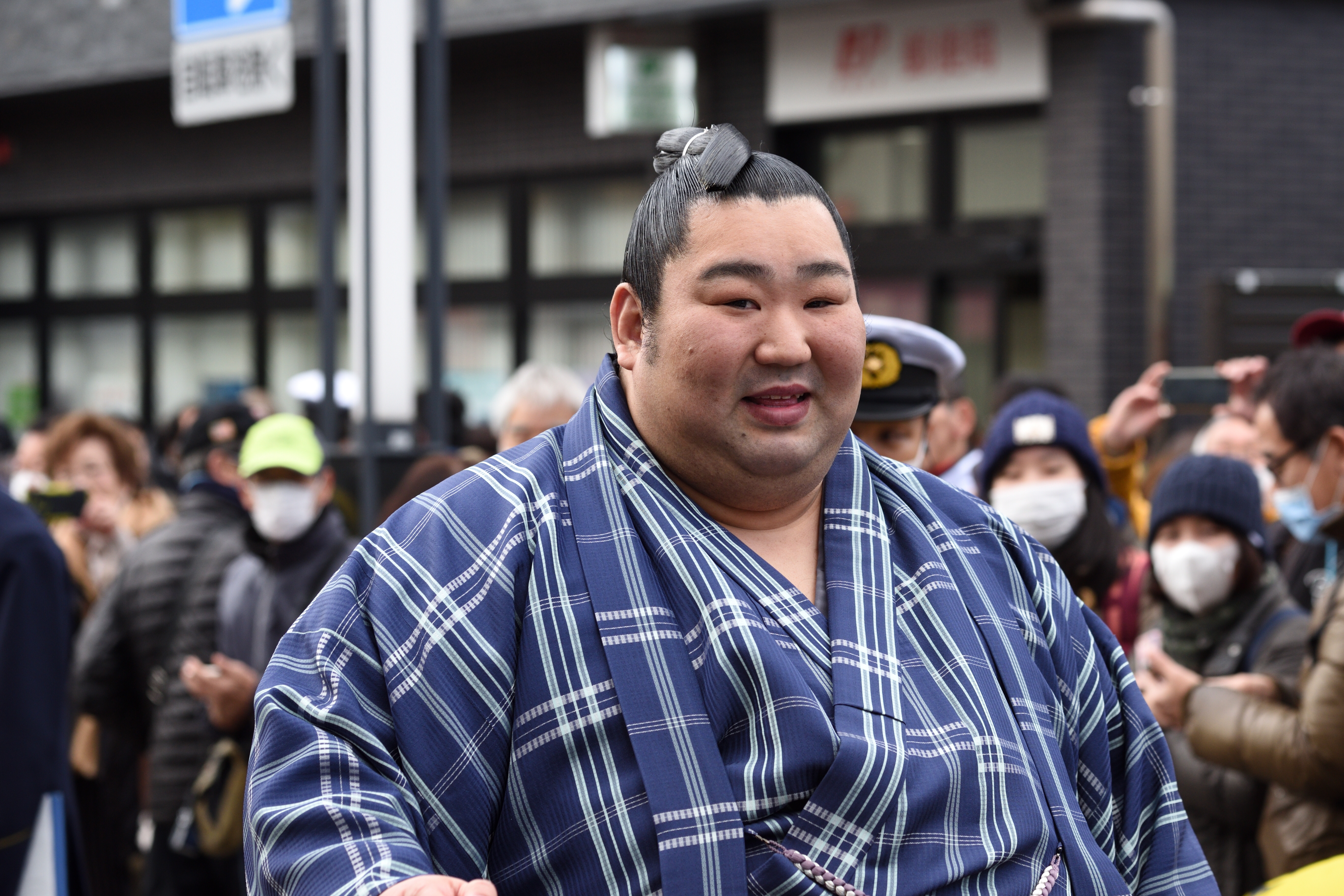
Tokushōryū was the surprise winner of the January tournament

- 9: Ishiura is docked 20 percent of one month's salary by the Japan Sumo Association following an incident in training at Miyagino stable when he came to blows with a junior ranked wrestler, Hokahō, after a series of heated bouts, leading to them having to be separated by Hakuhō. Hokahō is warned, while stablemaster Miyagino Oyakata is docked 20 percent of his salary for three months.
- 25: Emperor Naruhito, Empress Masako and their daughter Princess Aiko (an avid sumo fan since the age of five) watch the final nine matches of Day 14 of the Hatsu basho, the first time they have attended sumo since the Emperor ascended to the throne in May 2019.
- 26: The final day sees two maegashira, Shōdai and Tokushōryū, in contention for the championship. Shōdai defeats Mitakeumi to finish on 13–2, but in the final match Tokushōryū defeats ōzeki Takakeishō to win the yūshō with a 14–1 record, avoiding the need for a playoff with Shōdai. He only returned to the makuuchi division this tournament at the very bottom rank of west maegashira 17, and he is the first to win the championship at the lowest rank since Takatōriki in March 2000. He is also the first winner from Nara Prefecture in 98 years. Visibly emotional after the championship-winning bout, Tokushōryū at 33 is the third oldest first-time yūshō winner since the six tournaments per year era began in 1958, after Kyokutenhō and Tamawashi. He also receives his first ever special prizes, for Fighting Spirit and Outstanding Performance. Shodai also gets a share of the Fighting Spirit Prize, as does makuuchi debutant Kiribayama who scores 11–4. Hokutofuji is awarded the Technique Prize and also finishes on 11–4. Endō receives a share of the Outstanding Performance Prize for beating both yokozuna, Hakuhō and Kakuryū, although both end up dropping out of the tournament with injuries. Ōzeki Gōeidō can only score 5–10 and faces demotion from the rank after 33 straight tournaments at ōzeki, the tenth highest in history. The jūryō division championship is won by former ōzeki Terunofuji with a 13–2 record, continuing his comeback from injury. Former maegashira Arawashi retires.
- 28: Gōeidō's retirement is announced, leaving sumo with only one ōzeki for the first time in 38 years. Gōeidō is the first ōzeki to retire at that rank since Kaiō in 2011. He is staying in sumo as a coach under the elder name of Takekuma.
- 29: The promotions to jūryō are announced. There is one newcomer, Midorifuji, a Kindai University graduate from Isegahama stable. The other four are all returning: Wakamotoharu, Chiyonoumi, former maegashira Akiseyama (his 7th jūryō promotion), and Hakuyozan.
- 30: Furiwake Oyakata, the former Takamisakari, is announced as the new head coach of Azumazeki stable. Its future had been in doubt following the death of the previous Azumazeki Oyakata, ex-Ushiomaru, last December.

=== February ===
- 1: The retirement ceremony (danpatsu-shiki) of former sekiwake Takekaze (now Oshiogawa Oyakata) is held at the Ryōgoku Kokugikan.
- 3: A number of top wrestlers take part in the soy bean-throwing at the Setsubun festival at Narita-san Shinshō-ji Temple in Narita, Chiba.
- 4: The Sumo Association announces that it will hold an exhibition tournament from August 12 to 13, shortly after the 2020 Tokyo Olympics, to show sumo to an international audience. Dubbed the "Grand Sumo Tournament Rooting for the Tokyo 2020 Games", it will be part of the larger Nippon Festival, a nationwide collaboration focused on showing Olympic visitors Japan's culture and arts.
- 4: Chairman Hakkaku and head of public relations Shibatayama tell a meeting of wrestlers and stable masters that the ban on individual wrestlers posting on social media, introduced after an image uploaded by Abi showed another wrestler tied up as a prank, is to be continued indefinitely. "One person’s mistake can cause trouble for everyone. Fans have been driven away by scandals in the past" says Hakkaku.
- 9: The 44th Fuji TV one day tournament is held at the Kokugikan. Takayasu defeats Myogiryu in the final.
- 17: Sandanme Wakaichirō Ken, a wrestler of mixed African-American and Japanese ancestry who grew up in Houston, Texas, retires. With his retirement, there are no active rikishi from North America.
- 23: The Sumo Association says the March tournament in Osaka will go ahead despite the current coronavirus outbreak, although it urges those attending to take suitable anti-viral measures.
- 24: The banzuke for March is released, with Tokushōryū rising from maegashira 17 to maegashira 2 in the rankings. Shodai returns to sekiwake for the first time since January 2017. The retirement of Gōeidō creates room for a maegashira 18, with Kotonowaka Masahiro making his makuuchi debut at the expense of his injured stablemate Kotoyuki, who drops to jūryō. Kotonowaka is the son of his stablemaster, ex-sekiwake Kotonowaka Terumasa, and it is the ninth time that a father and son have both reached the top division. Returning to makuuchi are Nishikigi and Daiamami.
- 26: Coming under increasing pressure to cancel the March tournament, the Sumo Association says it will make a decision on March 1. The J.League has postponed all matches until March 15, the Tokyo Marathon organizers have restricted entry to elite runners only, and Olympic organisers have cancelled training events.
- 28: The Sumo Association admits that the tournament is unlikely to be held in a "regular fashion".

=== March ===
- 1: The Sumo Association confirms that the March Basho in Osaka will be held behind closed doors. The tournament will be broadcast, but will be cancelled if any wrestler is found to have contracted the coronavirus. This will be the first closed door basho since a June 1945 tournament where only injured World War II veterans were invited to attend.
- 8: With the tournament underway several wrestlers remark on how odd it is to fight in a virtually empty arena, with Enhō commenting, "It’s like I can’t raise my fighting spirit...It made me wonder what I’m fighting for."
- 15: Chiyomaru withdraws from the tournament with a fever. After two straight days with a temperature of above 37.5 °C he undergoes a test for the coronavirus, which comes back negative on March 17. He re-entered the tournament on March 18.
- 22: The tournament ends with both Yokozuna on identical scores deciding the championship in the last bout, the first time this has happened since 2013. Hakuho wins the match to take his 44th yūshō with a 13–2 record. Kakuryū is runner up on 12–3 alongside maegashira Takanoshō, who wins the Fighting Spirit prize. Aoiyama who had been sole leader only to lose his last three matches and finish on 11–4, gets the Technique Award. Ōnoshō wins the Outstanding Performance prize for his victory over Hakuhō on Day 10. Asanoyama finishes on 11–4, his fourth straight double-digit score, and the judging committee recommend his promotion to ōzeki (although with 32 wins over three tournaments he is one win short of the traditional standard).
- 25: Asanoyama's promotion to ōzeki is officially announced. It is also announced that three wrestlers are returning to the jūryō division – former maegashira Fujiazuma and Chiyonoō, plus Asanoyama's stablemate Asabenkei. There are no wrestlers making their jūryō debut this time.
- 26: Former maegashira Sōkokurai retires to take over Arashio stable.

=== April ===
- 3: The May 2020 and July 2020 tournaments are both postponed two weeks due to the coronavirus outbreak; the July tournament was previously moved forward a week to avoid conflict with the 2020 Summer Olympics in Tokyo, which have since been postponed to a year.
- 10: The Sumo Association confirmed the sport's first coronavirus case. Sandanme 11 wrestler Shobushi of Takadagawa stable, whose identity was not disclosed at the time, tested positive after developing a fever some six days earlier. All sumo wrestlers and officials were ordered to stay indoors until further notice. The Sumo Association's communications director, Shibatayama, told reporters that the situation around the world had become more serious and that the JSA needed to decide the direction they would be going in with regard to the already-postponed May basho.
- 17: Former sekiwake Toyonoshima retires.
- 25: The Sumo Association announced that stablemaster Takadagawa and five wrestlers tested positive for the coronavirus. One of the affected wrestlers was Hakuyozan, a jūryō wrestler in Takadagawa stable, while the other four were lower-division wrestlers whose identities and stables were not disclosed. Shibatayama from the Sumo Association said that the banzuke for the May tournament would be published on 27 April as scheduled, but noted that the tournament could still be closed to the public or cancelled depending on the situation.
- 27: The banzuke for the Natsu basho is released. Asanoyama makes his debut at ōzeki, and Kotoshōhō makes his top division debut. Okinoumi returns to the sanyaku ranks for the first time since November 2016, and Terunofuji returns to makuuchi after a 14 tournament absence during which he fell to jonidan.

=== May ===
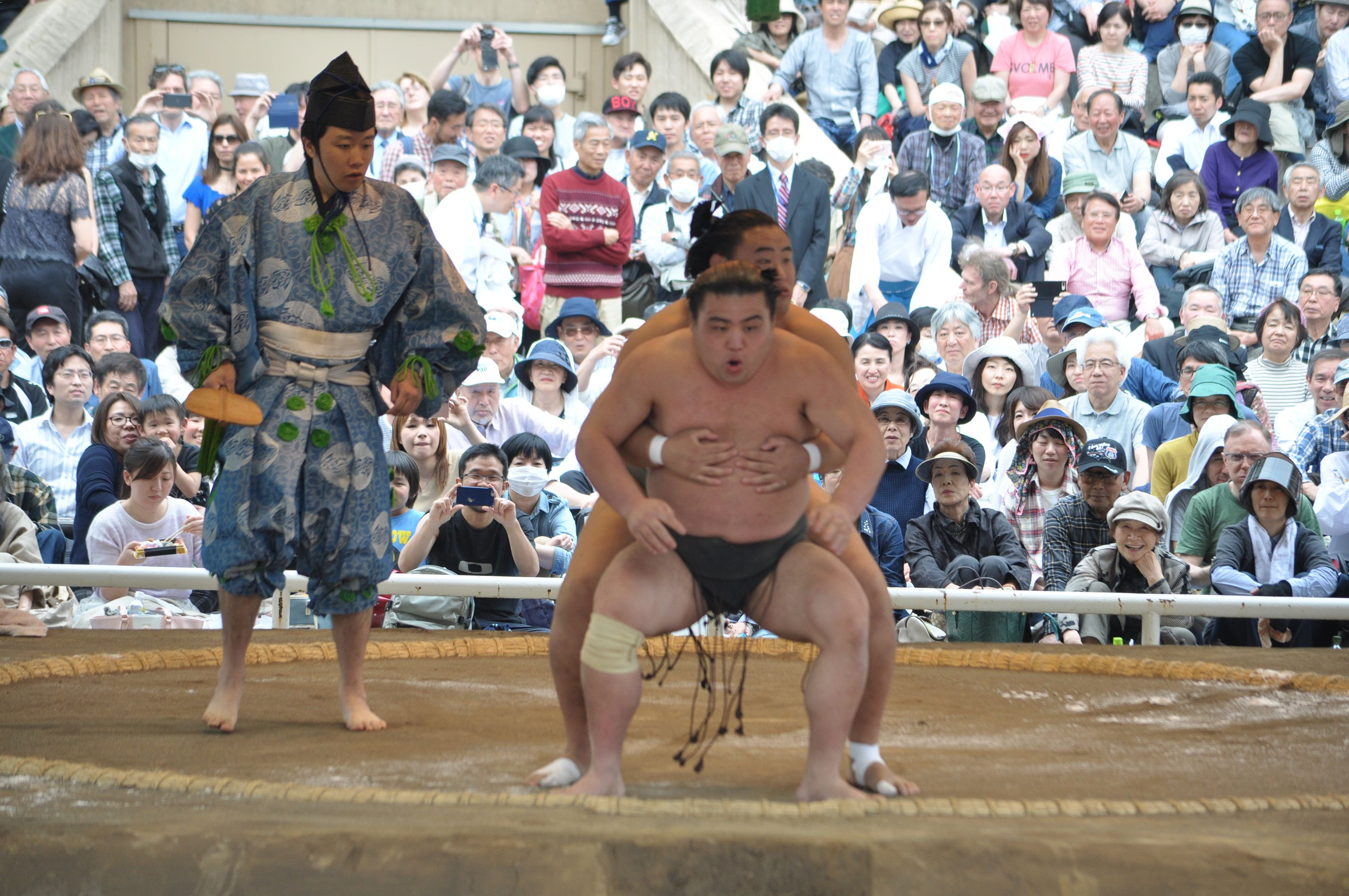
Shobushi, seen here performing comic sumo in April 2017, became the first wrestler to die of COVID-19.

- 1: The Sumo Association said it would review the schedule for the May basho if Prime Minister Shinzo Abe follows through with plans to extend Japan's state of emergency due to the coronavirus pandemic.
- 4: Following the extension of Japan's national state of emergency until 31 May, the Sumo Association officially cancels the May Grand Sumo Tournament. It is the second cancellation of a basho since 1946, and the first since March 2011 amidst a match-fixing scandal. The Sumo Association also announced it was making plans to move the 2020 July basho from Nagoya to Tokyo, with the meet likely to be conducted behind closed doors.
- 13: The Sumo Association announced the death of sandanme wrestler Shobushi (Takadagawa stable) from multiple organ failure after contracting the coronavirus one month earlier. The 28-year-old was the first sumo wrestler to die from the virus, and is also thought to be the first person in their 20s to die from the virus in Japan. He suffered from diabetes and in 2016 had to withdraw from a bout because of hypoglycemia. JSA chairman Hakkaku says, "We cannot find any words to say when we think about the broken hearts of his family. I can only imagine how hard it must have been, battling illness for over a month, but like a wrestler he endured it bravely and fought the disease until the end. I just want him to rest peacefully now."
- 18: COVID-19 antibody testing is made available to all Sumo Association members, including wrestlers and stablemasters.

=== June ===
- 22: Sumo Association spokesman Oguruma confirms that although the Japanese government will allow events with up to 5000 spectators from July 10, the aim is to hold the next tournament in an empty arena. The ban on wrestlers visiting other stables for training (degeiko) may be lifted two weeks before the start of the tournament if it is medically safe to do so.

=== July ===
- 6: The Sumo Association announce the results of their antibody testing. Of the 891 personnel tested, five came up positive for antibodies. Four were cleared after PCR testing, while one was believed to have been infected in May and already cured. The Association does not confirm whether any were wrestlers or if they were other members.
- 10: The Sumo Association confirm that the July tournament will go ahead, with a decision on whether to admit spectators to be made at a later board meeting.
- 13: Nakagawa stable is closed down after three wrestlers complain of physical and verbal abuse by its head coach, the former Asahisato. Nakagawa Oyakata is demoted two rungs in the Sumo Association's hierarchy and transferred to Tokitsukaze stable. Nakagawa stable's wrestlers and personnel are divided up amongst seven different stables.
- 13: Former maegashira Seirō retires after a 15-year career due to health problems.
- 13: The Sumo Association announces its decision to open the July basho in Tokyo to a maximum of 2,500 spectators per day, which is less than one-fourth the total capacity of the Kokugikan. It is also announced that the November tournament will be switched from Fukuoka to Tokyo, and that all remaining jungyo tours this year are cancelled.
- 15: Former sekiwake Tochiōzan retires. He is staying in sumo as a coach under the name Kiyomigata Oyakata.
- 19: The July tournament opens with the limited number of spectators required to wear masks, have their temperature taken, and sit apart with only one person in the four-seat masu boxes. Fans have been instructed to applaud and not cheer, and not approach any wrestlers for autographs.
- 26: Abi is removed partway through the July tournament by his stablemaster Shikoroyama for violations against the JSA's coronavirus containment guidelines. He had been spotted dining out with friends. JSA chairman Hakkaku described Abi's actions as "unpardonable".
- 28: Tagonoura Oyakata, the former Takanotsuru, is warned by the Sumo Association after a photo emerges showing him apparently drunk and passed out at a restaurant. He tests negative for COVID-19.

=== August ===
- 2: On the final day of the tournament, Terunofuji defeats Mitakeumi (11-4) to win his second top division championship with a 13–2 record, five years after his first. It is a remarkable comeback as Terunofuji had only just returned to makuuchi following a fall to jonidan through injury to both his knees and illnesses such as hepatitis and diabetes. His victory on Day 15 avoided the need for a playoff with the winner of the day's final match, new ōzeki Asanoyama, who defeats sekiwake Shodai (11-4). Asanoyama finishes sole runner-up on 12–3. Terunofuji is also awarded his first Technique Prize, and shares the Outstanding Performance Award with Mitakeumi and komusubi Daieisho (11-4). Shodai receives the Fighting Spirit Award. In the jūryō division there is an unusual six-way playoff for the championship, with Meisei eventually emerging victorious after defeating two of his Tatsunami stablemates, Hōshōryū and Akua. Veteran Kizenryū, who was promoted to jūryō a record nine times but never managed a winning record there, announces his retirement.
- 4: Nine unidentified rikishi flee from Shikihide stable claiming abuse from the wife of the stablemaster, the former Kitazakura, after she took over training due to her husband falling ill.
- 4: The Sumo Association announce that the Nagoya tournament in the year 2021 will start a week earlier than normal to avoid clashing with the rescheduling of the 2020 Summer Olympics in Tokyo on July 23, 2021. The sumo will now conclude on July 18.
- 5: Reports emerge that Abi has submitted his resignation to the Sumo Association over his violation of the coronavirus rules.
- 5: Promotions to the jūryō division are announced. There are two newcomers, Ōki of the Shikoroyama stable and Nishikifuji of the Isegahama stable. Returning are former maegashira Kitaharima (his eighth jūryō promotion) and Chiyonokuni.
- 6: The Japan Sumo Association rejects the resignation of Abi, and instead bans him for three tournaments and reduces his pay by 50% for five months for violating coronavirus rules. His stablemaster Shikoroyama is also given a salary cut of 20% for six months. The wrestler who accompanied Abi, ex-jūryō Gokushindo of the Nishikido stable, is suspended for two tournaments and his stablemaster warned.
- 7: The Sumo Association lifts the ban on wrestlers going out on their own, but issues 16 "strict compliance rules," including "Do not go to clubs where hosts and hostesses entertain customers" and "Do not drink too much."
- 14: It is announced that an unidentified makushita wrestler tested positive for the virus, but with a low viral load, bringing sumo's total known wrestler infections to 13. Additionally, former maegashira Tamarikidō, who now coaches at Nishonoseki stable under the name Matsugane, was also announced to have tested positive but was not working at the July tournament.
- 27 August: Former juryo 3 Kizakiumi retires at age 25 due to a persistent neck injury.
- 31: The banzuke for the September tournament is released. After his yusho in July Terunofuji rises to maegashira 1. Daieishō makes his debut at sekiwake. There are three sekiwake listed, none of whom had previously been an ōzeki, the first time this has happened since September 2011. There are two newcomers to the top division, Hōshōryū who is former yokozuna Asashōryū's nephew, and Tobizaru, who is former maegashira Hidenoumi's brother. They become the eleventh pair of brothers to reach makuuchi.

=== September ===
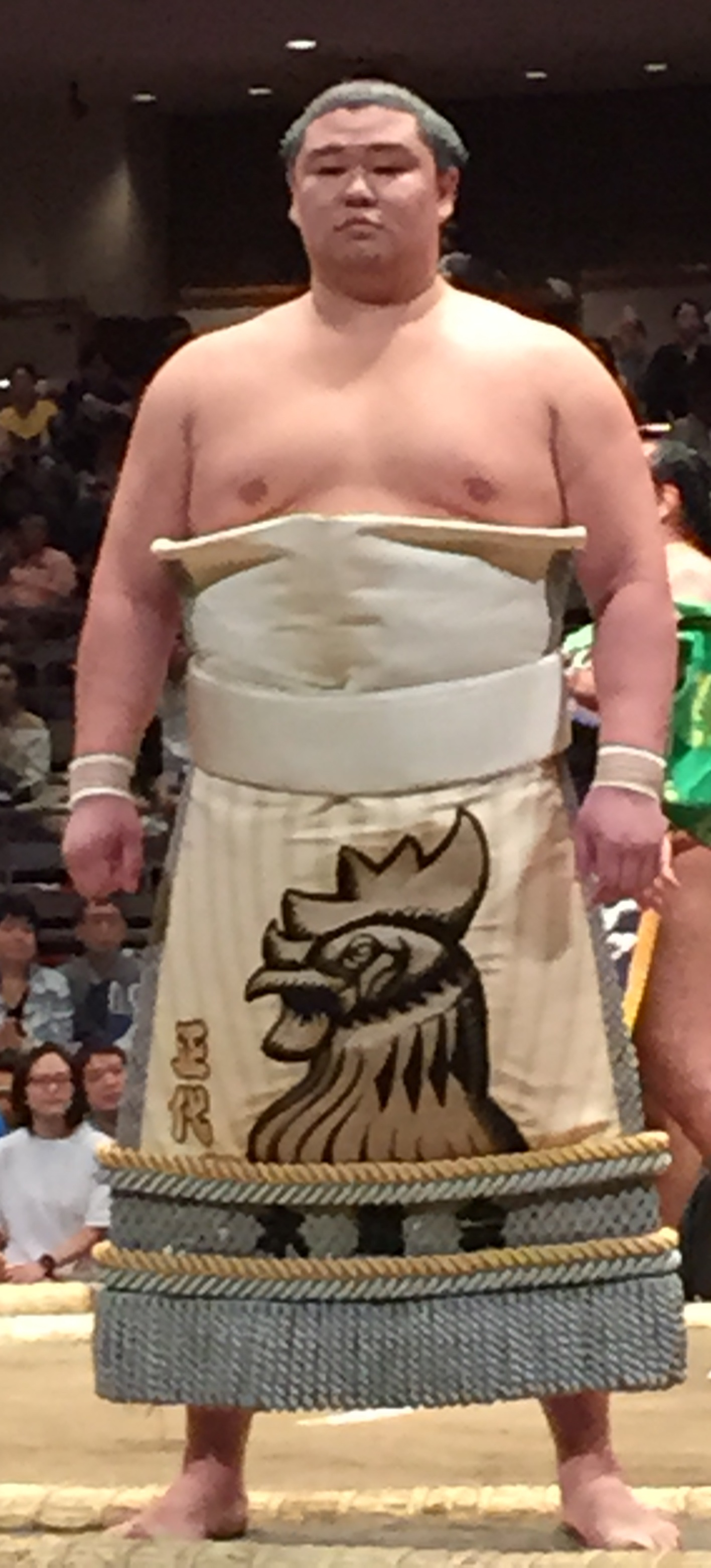
Shōdai won the championship and promotion to ōzeki in September

- 10: The whole of the Tamanoi stable are withdrawn from the forthcoming tournament due to a coronavirus outbreak. There are 19 confirmed cases, with 12 hospitalized with minor symptoms, and seven without symptoms are isolating at the stable. The Sumo Association says the tournament will still go ahead. Fujiazuma, one of two current sekitori at the stable (the other being Azumaryu) is among those who test positive.
- 11: Both yokozuna, Hakuhō and Kakuryū, withdraw from the September tournament prior to Day 1. Both suffered injuries in the July tournament that forced their withdrawals mid-tournament and Hakuhō underwent endoscopic surgery on his right knee in August. Kakuryu's stablemaster, former ozeki Kirishima, indicated that Kakuryu would consider retirement if he could not return to healthy competition in November. It is the first time since 1983 that a tournament with two yokozuna on the banzuke has seen both absent from Day 1.
- 27: Sekiwake Shōdai clinches his first yūshō, winning the September 2020 basho with a record of 13–2. Shōdai, who also took home the Outstanding Performance Prize and the Fighting Spirit Prize, defeated Tobizaru on the final day. Tobizaru was also awarded the Fighting Spirit Prize, finishing his first tournament in makunouchi with a record of 11–4. The runner-up was Takakeishō, who defeated fellow ōzeki Asanoyama in the last match of the basho to finish with a 12–3 record. The Sumo Association later announced that an extraordinary meeting would take place on 30 September, where Shōdai is expected to be promoted to the second-highest rank of ōzeki. The jūryō division championship is won by Chiyonokuni with a 14–1 record, his second straight yūshō after winning the makushita championship in the previous tournament. By contrast, new sekitori Oki, who has an arm injury, becomes the first wrestler since 15 day tournaments began in 1949 to lose every one of his bouts in his jūryō debut.
- 30: Shōdai's promotion to the ōzeki rank is unanimously approved by the Sumo Association. In his acceptance speech, Shōdai said that he would devote himself to the way of sumo "with the spirit of utmost sincerity so as not to disgrace the name of ōzeki." He later told reporters that he was "relieved" and that he was "in a position where you are expected not to lose."
- 30: It is announced that all 28 Tamanoi stable wrestlers who were forced to quarantine and miss the September tournament will not suffer any fall in rank for the next tournament.
- 30: The promotions to jūryō are announced. There are no debutants, but four are returning: Takagenji, Jōkōryū, Chiyonoumi, and Ura. Ura was last ranked in jūryō in January 2018, falling all the way to jonidan 106 on the banzuke through injury before making a successful comeback beginning last November.

=== October ===
- 18: The Sumo Association announced that it would raise the daily spectator limit to 5,000 people - or about half the capacity of the Kokugikan - for the upcoming November basho in Tokyo. A limit of 2,500 daily spectators had been put into place since the July tournament due to the coronavirus pandemic.
- 26: The banzuke for the November tournament is released. One wrestler, Akua, is making his top division debut and among those making their return to the top division, after more than a year away, are Chiyoshōma and Chiyonokuni. Two former ōzeki, Terunofuji and Takayasu, return to the sanyaku ranks at komusubi. Takanoshō makes his sanyaku debut, at sekiwake. Shōdai makes his ōzeki debut. He is the seventh oldest since 1958 to make the ōzeki rank at 28 years and ten months, and the first from Kumamoto Prefecture since Tochihikari in July 1962.

=== November ===
- 5: Yokozuna Kakuryū announces his withdrawal from the final tournament of 2020, citing a lower back injury; this is Kakuryū's third withdrawal in a row.
- 6: Yokozuna Hakuho also withdraws from the November 2020 tournament due to complications from his knee surgery that kept him out of the previous tournament; this is the first time Hakuho has ever missed back-to-back tournaments.
- 12: New ōzeki Shodai withdraws from the tournament with an ankle injury, following fellow ōzeki Asanoyama two days previously. This leaves Takakeishō as the only ōzeki or yokozuna still in the tournament.
- 14: Former ōzeki Kotoshogiku retires from sumo mid-tournament after a 1–5 start.
- 17: Former komusubi Gagamaru retires from sumo after being absent from 5 consecutive tournaments.
- 22: Ozeki Takakeisho wins the November tournament with a 13–2 record, his second career top division yusho, after losing to challenger komusubi Terunofuji in the final regular match but besting him in the subsequent playoff bout; the championship puts Takakeisho within reach of promotion to yokozuna. Takakeishō's victory ensures that for the first time since 1991, every top division tournament of the year has had a different winner. Terunofuji is awarded the Technique sanshō, Chiyonokuni (10–5) and Shimanoumi (11–4) are both awarded a Fighting Spirit sanshō, and the Outstanding Performance sanshō goes unawarded. Midorifuji claims the yusho in the second division, also in a playoff bout, defeating Kyokushūhō having lost to him in their regulation match. Both wrestlers had 10–5 records. The makushita division championship is won by Ryūkō with a perfect 7–0 score, ensuring his return to jūryō. In addition to Kotoshōgiku and Gagamaru, former jūryō Hitenryū retires.
- 24: The Sumo Association's Yokozuna Deliberation Council issues warnings to yokozuna Hakuhō and Kakuryū over their lack of participation in recent sumo tournaments. This is the middle of three notices that the council can issue to yokozuna whose performance is contrary to what is expected of the rank (between a notice of encouragement and a recommendation for retirement). It is the first time in history that warning notices have been issued.
- 25: The promotions to jūryō for January 2021 are announced. There are two newcomers, Ōhō, formerly known as Naya who is the son of former sekiwake Takatōriki and the grandson of former yokozuna Taihō, and Tōhakuryū, formerly Shiraishi. Returning to jūryō are Ryūkō and Yago.
- 27: As he is approaching the mandatory retirement age of 65, the head coach of Takasago stable (former ōzeki Asashio) passes control of the stable over to the former sekiwake Asasekiryū, swapping elder names with him and becoming Nishikijima Oyakata. He will stay in the Sumo Association for a further five years as a consultant.

=== December ===
- 10: Yokozuna Kakuryu acquires Japanese citizenship, allowing him to eventually become coach and sumo elder upon retirement.
- 12: A coronavirus outbreak occurs at the Tatsunami stable, infecting maegashira Akua and 9 others.
- 24: The Sumo Association releases the banzuke for the January 2021 tournament. Midorifuji, the November winner in jūryō, is promoted to the top division for the first time at maegashira 14. Also promoted to maegashira is Akiseyama, who returns to makuuchi for the first time in almost five years. Terunofuji, the top division runner-up in November, is elevated to sekiwake, while Mitakeumi drops from sekiwake to komusubi.
- 31: The Sumo Association announces that top division wrestler Wakatakakage has tested positive for COVID-19, and that everyone in his family and Arashio stable will be tested for the virus. It is uncertain whether Wakatakakage will be cleared in time to compete in the January 2021 basho, which starts on 10 January.

== Deaths ==
- 12 Jan: Former makushita 13 Midorimine, better known as professional wrestler Kazuo Sakurada, aged 71, from arrhythmia.
- 28 Feb: Former makushita 15 Daishōchi, aged 35, from an unspecified illness.
- 28 March: Former jūryō 2 Kakureizan, elder brother of Terao and Sakahoko, aged 60, from heart failure. His death was not disclosed until 16 May.
- 13 May: Sandanme 11 Shobushi, aged 28, from multiple organ failure caused by COVID-19.
- 9 August: Former maegashira 1 Zaōnishiki, aged 67, from multiple myeloma.
- 26 August: Former makushita 3 Maeta, aged 38, heart attack.
- 19 September: Former komusubi Yutakayama, former Minato Oyakata, aged 72, from pancreatic cancer.

== See also ==
- Glossary of sumo terms
- List of active sumo wrestlers
- List of years in sumo
