= Shobushi Kanji =

Japanese sumo wrestler (1991–2020)

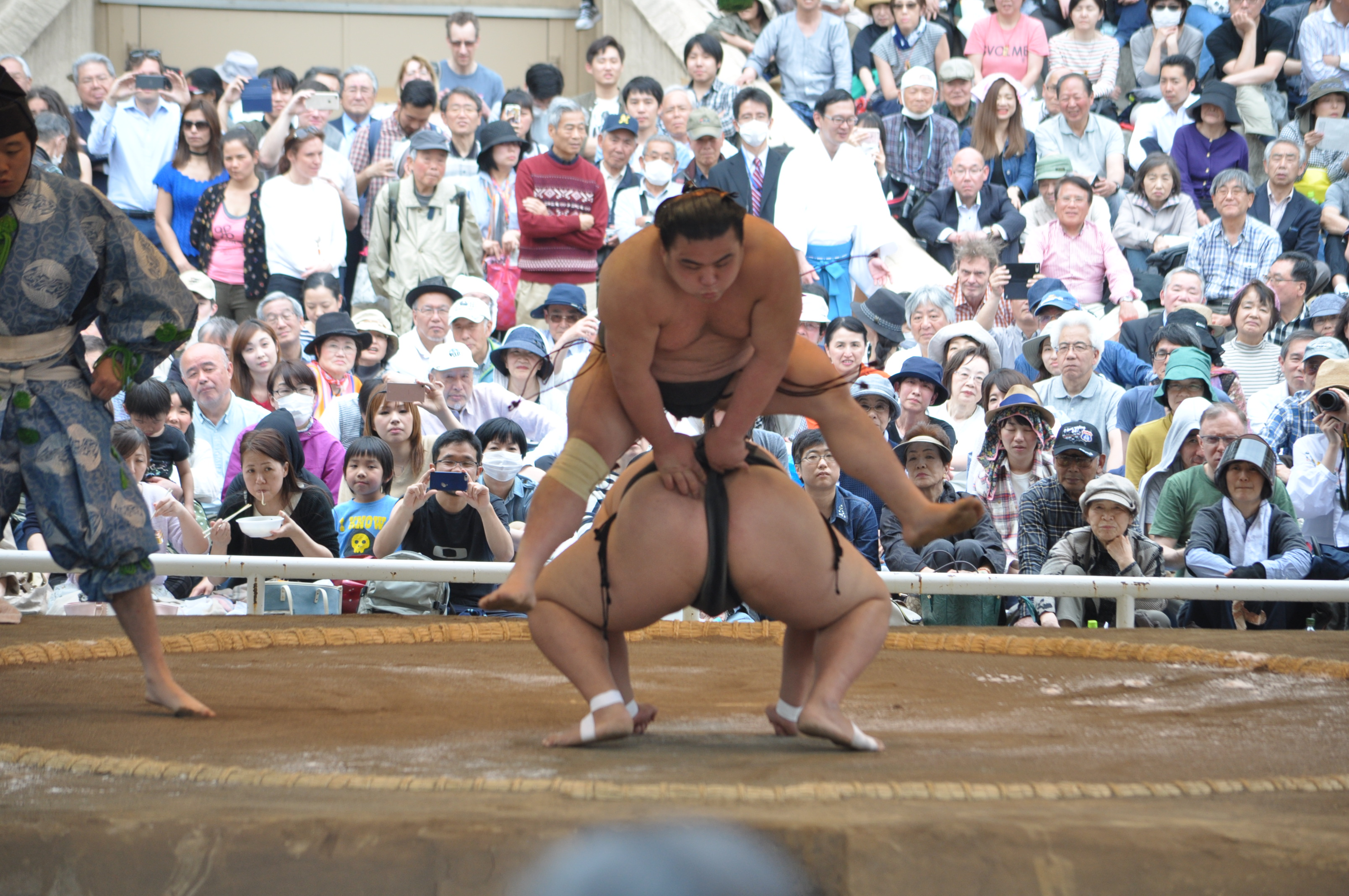
- Shobushi performing shokkiri, or comic sumo, with Takamisato at an exhibition in April 2017

Personal information
- Native name: 勝武士 幹士
- Born: Kiyotaka Ōmori; November 4, 1991 Kōfu, Yamanashi, Japan
- Died: May 13, 2020 (aged 28) Tokyo, Japan
- Height: 1.66 m (5 ft 5 1/2 in)
- Weight: 111.2 kg (245 lb; 17.51 st)

Sport
- Sport: Sumo
- Heya: Takadagawa
- Record: 260-279
- Debut: March, 2007
- Highest rank: Sandanme 11 (November 2017)

Shobushi Kanji (勝武士 幹士; real name Kiyotaka Suetake (末武 清孝, Suetake Kiyotaka) and born Kiyotaka Ōmori (大森 清孝, Ōmori Kiyotaka); November 4, 1991 – May 13, 2020) was a Japanese sumo wrestler from Kōfu, Yamanashi. He was the first sumo wrestler to die from COVID-19, and is also thought to be the first person in their 20s to die from the virus in Japan.

== Career ==
Shobushi did judo at Ryuo Junior High School in Kai. He joined Takadagawa stable in 2007. His highest rank was sandanme 11, which he achieved in November 2017. He was a personal attendant (付け人, tsukebito) to his stablemate Ryuden, who was a fellow Yamanashi Prefecture native and alumnus of his junior high school judo club. Starting in March 2014, Shobushi was a performer of comic sumo displays (初っ切り, shokkiri) on regional tours and exhibition tournaments. His partner in the performances was Takamisato of the Azumazeki stable. Usually both wrestlers in shokkiri are from the same stable, but Azumazeki had no-one small enough to provide a contrast to the larger Takamisato, so Shobushi who was of short stature and weighed only around 110 kilograms (240 lb) was asked instead. Following Takamisato's retirement in 2018 Shobushi's partner was Ebisumaru, who made his professional debut alongside Shobushi and is also from Takadagawa. Shobushi also performed at Takekaze's retirement ceremony (断髪式, danpatsu-shiki) in February 2020.

== Illness and death ==
Shobushi was the first sumo wrestler confirmed to have been infected with the COVID-19 during the COVID-19 pandemic in Japan, though his identity was not disclosed at the time. On April 4, 2020, he developed a fever, but was not able to get medical attention or get admitted to a hospital until April 8 when coughing up blood, due to the high number of people with symptoms that Japan was experiencing at the time. An initial test for coronavirus came back negative, but after being transferred to a different hospital he tested positive on April 10. He remained in intensive care from 19 April until his death from multiple organ failure brought on by COVID-19 related pneumonia on May 13. Prior to his death, he suffered from diabetes and in 2016 had to withdraw from a bout because of hypoglycemia. He was the first active sumo wrestler to die since Wakamiume of the makushita division died of acute myelogenous leukemia in 2008. Shortly before the announcement of his death, the May tournament was cancelled.

The Nishonoseki ichimon (a group of related stables) was planning to hold a ichimon funeral for Shobushi, which are normally reserved for wrestlers who go on to be elders of the Japan Sumo Association (JSA). The JSA chairman, Hakkaku, said after Shobushi's death, "We cannot find any words to say when we think about the broken hearts of his family. It must have been so very painful to fight the disease for over a month but, like a sumo wrestler, he persevered and endured, fighting to the very end. We only wish that he rests in peace now."

== Fighting style ==
Shobushi was an oshi-sumo specialist who preferred pushing and thrusting rather than fighting on the mawashi. His most common winning kimarite or techniques were oshi-dashi (push out) and tsuki-otoshi (thrust over).

== Career record ==
Shobushi Kanji
Year	January Hatsu basho, Tokyo	March Haru basho, Osaka	May Natsu basho, Tokyo	July Nagoya basho, Nagoya	September Aki basho, Tokyo	November Kyūshū basho, Fukuoka
2007	x	(Maezumo)	East Jonokuchi #24; 4–3	East Jonidan #117; 3–4	East Jonokuchi #3; 4–3	East Jonidan #99; 2–5
2008	West Jonokuchi #2; 6–1	East Jonidan #40; 2–5	East Jonidan #73; 4–3	West Jonidan #46; 2–5	East Jonidan #82; 3–4	East Jonidan #103; 5–2
2009	West Jonidan #61; 4–3	East Jonidan #33; 3–4	West Jonidan #56; 4–3	West Jonidan #33; 6–1	West Sandanme #70; 1–6	West Jonidan #4; 2–5
2010	East Jonidan #37; 3–4	East Jonidan #56; 3–4	East Jonidan #78; 5–2	East Jonidan #34; 6–1	West Sandanme #70; 2–5	West Sandanme #100; 2–5
2011	East Jonidan #34; 5–2	Tournament Cancelled; 0–0–0	East Sandanme #97; 5–2	West Sandanme #49; 3–4	West Sandanme #68; 2–5	East Sandanme #94; 4–3
2012	West Sandanme #77; 5–2	West Sandanme #45; 2–5	East Sandanme #75; 1–6	West Jonidan #9; 4–3	East Sandanme #92; 4–3	East Sandanme #73; 4–3
2013	East Sandanme #55; 2–5	East Sandanme #73; 4–3	West Sandanme #54; 1–6	West Sandanme #86; 3–4	East Jonidan #6; 5–2	East Sandanme #74; 2–5
2014	East Jonidan #1; 4–3	West Sandanme #81; 5–2	West Sandanme #49; 0–7	West Sandanme #99; 5–2	East Sandanme #65; 3–4	East Sandanme #82; 5–2
2015	East Sandanme #50; 2–5	West Sandanme #75; 3–4	East Sandanme #96; 4–3	East Sandanme #76; 1–6	East Jonidan #23; 5–2	East Sandanme #88; 5–2
2016	West Sandanme #54; 5–2	West Sandanme #27; 2–5	West Sandanme #56; 4–3	West Sandanme #41; 4–3	East Sandanme #25; 4–3	East Sandanme #12; 1–6
2017	East Sandanme #41; 2–5	West Sandanme #72; 3–4	West Sandanme #90; 4–3	West Sandanme #70; 5–2	West Sandanme #37; 5–2	East Sandanme #11; 2–5
2018	East Sandanme #41; 2–5	West Sandanme #65; 3–4	West Sandanme #81; 2–5	West Jonidan #6; 4–3	West Sandanme #87; 4–3	East Sandanme #72; 3–4
2019	East Sandanme #85; 3–4	West Sandanme #95; 2–5	West Jonidan #25; 4–3	East Jonidan #5; 2–5	East Jonidan #41; 5–2	East Jonidan #4; 4–3
2020	East Sandanme #84; 4–3	West Sandanme #64; 3–4	West Sandanme #82; Tournament Cancelled; 0–0–0	West Sandanme #82; Retired –	x	x
Record given as wins–losses–absences Top division champion Top division runner-up Retired Lower divisions Non-participation Sanshō key: F=Fighting spirit; O=Outstanding performance; T=Technique Also shown: ★=Kinboshi; P=Playoff(s); Divisions: Makuuchi — Jūryō — Makushita — Sandanme — Jonidan — Jonokuchi Makuuchi ranks: Yokozuna — Ōzeki — Sekiwake — Komusubi — Maegashira

== See also ==
- List of past sumo wrestlers
- Glossary of sumo terms
