= Ryūden Gōshi =

Japanese sumo wrestler

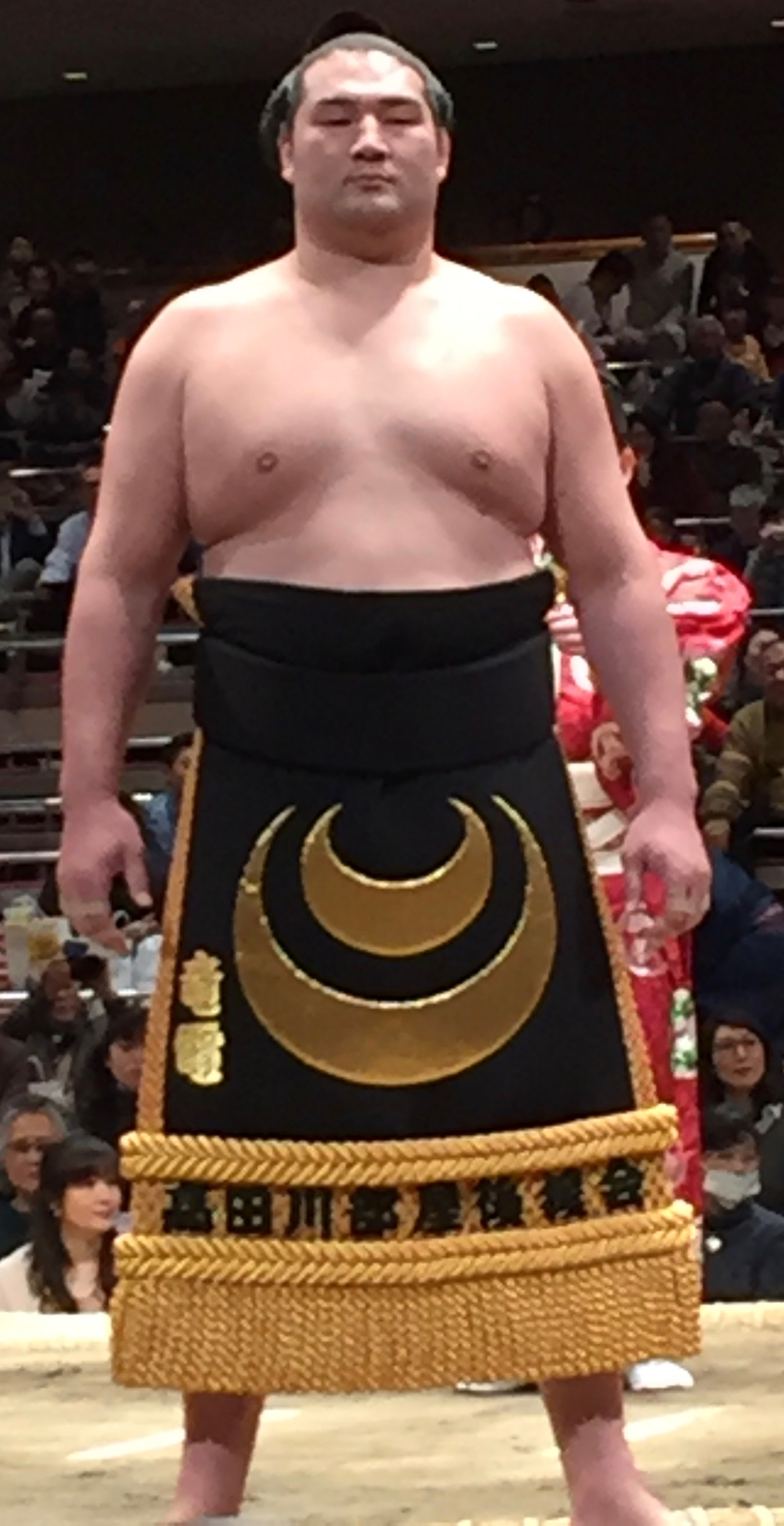
- Ryūden in 2017

Personal information
- Native name: 竜電 剛至
- Born: Yūki Watanabe; November 10, 1990 (age 36) Kōfu, Yamanashi Prefecture; Japan
- Height: 189 cm (6 ft 2 in)
- Weight: 161 kg (355 lb; 25.4 st)

Sport
- Sport: Sumo
- Rank: see below
- Heya: Takadagawa
- Debut: March, 2006
- Highest rank: Komusubi (July, 2019)
- Championships: 2 Jūryō; 2 Makushita; 1 Sandanme; 1 Jonidan; 1 Jonokuchi
- Special Prizes: 1 (Fighting Spirit); 1 (Technique)
- Updated on 24 September 2023

Ryūden Gōshi (Japanese: 竜電 剛至; born November 10, 1990 as Yūki Watanabe (渡邊 裕樹, Watanabe Yūki)) is a Japanese professional sumo wrestler from Kōfu, Yamanashi Prefecture. He made his professional debut in March 2006 and first reached the top makuuchi division in January 2018. Ryūden has won a championship in every division except makuuchi and has earned two special prizes, one for Fighting Spirit and one for Technique. His highest rank has been komusubi. He is a member of Takadagawa stable.

== Early career and background ==
As a first grader at Ikeda Elementary School, he followed his two older brothers and took up the sport of judo. He continued to practice at Kai Shiritsu Ryūō Junior High School in the nearby town of Kai, where he won the Yamanashi prefectural judo tournament in the over-90 kilos category. Destined to join the judo club of a prestigious high school outside his native prefecture, he was however persuaded in his second year of junior high school by Sendagawa-oyakata (former sekiwake Akinoshima), a coach at Takadagawa stable who was visiting his school to scout new apprentices, to give sumo a try, telling him he would "become a man among men". He made his debut in March 2006, the same tournament as Tochinoshin and Sakaizawa. He was immediately given the shikona, or ring name, Ryūden, with the "Ryū" part taken from his previous school and the "den" part from the legendary wrestler Raiden. He was talked of, alongside Masunoyama, as a candidate for the first wrestler born in the Heisei era to reach the sekitori status when he produced a 5–2 score at the rank of makushita 15 in November 2009. However his progress then stalled with two consecutive make-koshi, and he suffered a concussion after falling from the dohyō in a match against Takanoiwa in March 2010, and had to be carried off in a wheelchair. He was then overtaken by Takayasu who did become the first Heisei-born sekitori in November 2010, along Masunoyama. Commenting on this historic failure, his master Takadagawa declared that Ryūden had succumbed to pressure.

Ryūden was however promoted to jūryō after scoring a perfect 7–0 record and taking the makushita championship at the September 2012 tournament. He was promoted along five others, including Kyokushūhō, Akiseyama, Homarefuji and Masakaze. Ryūden became the first sekitori produced by the new Takadagawa stablemaster (Akinoshima), who had taken over the running of the stable from former ōzeki Maenoyama, in 2009. He was also the first sekitori from Yamanashi Prefecture since Hidenohana, 24 years earlier. At the time of his promotion, his master encouraged him to wrestle in such a way as to create excitement and rally the public to a Japanese wrestler, since sumo was dominated by Mongolian wrestlers at the time.

However Ryūden suffered a fracture of his right hip joint in his jūryō debut in November and had to withdraw from the tournament. During his long injury recuperation he made two abortive attempts to return, breaking the hip twice more. This resulted in him falling all the way down to jonokuchi 17 in the rankings, journalists commenting that Ryūden "had to go through hell". For four consecutive tournaments from January until July 2014, although still injured, he fought (and won) one match at the end of the tournament, solely to prevent falling off the banzuke completely (banzukegai). He was finally fit to return in September 2014 and won three consecutive yūshō to quickly return to the fourth highest makushita division. He was finally promoted back to jūryō in November 2016. Only Hokutokuni (maezumō) and Kotobeppu (jonokuchi 39) had returned to jūryō from lower ranks than Ryūden had.

== Makuuchi career ==
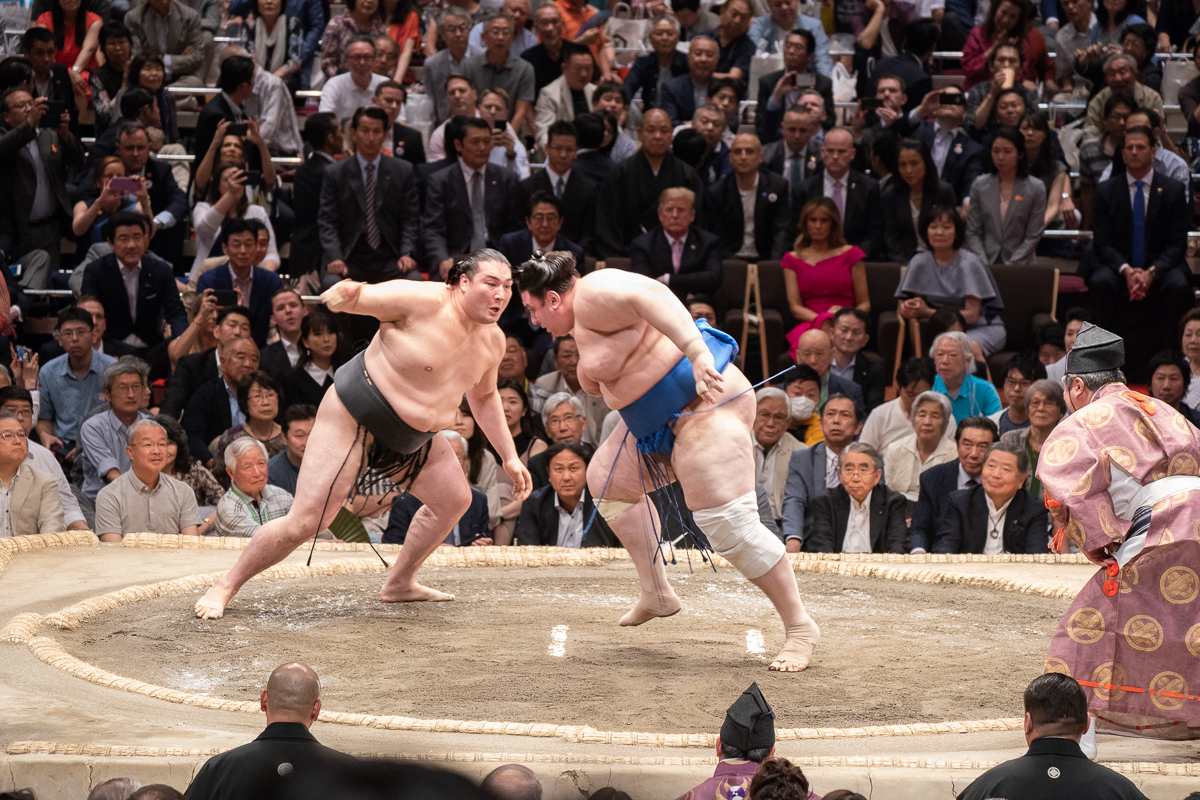
Ryūden competing against Aoiyama in May 2019, on the day he received his first Technique prize.

Ryūden was promoted to the top makuuchi division in January 2018, becoming the second top division wrestler from Takadagawa stable (after Kagayaki) to achieve this feat since the new head coach took over. At the time of his promotion, he was the first Yamanashi Prefecture native to be ranked in makuuchi since Ōnohana in March 1988, and the seventh postwar wrestler from this prefecture to achieve this promotion. He was also the second wrestler in sumo history, after Kotobeppu, to earn a promotion to makuuchi after being relegated to the jonokuchi division.

He scored ten wins in his top division debut and shared the Fighting Spirit prize with fellow newcomer Abi. Since then, he has stayed in makuuchi and has mainly shown solid performances. In September 2018, Ryūden was the fastest maegashira-ranked wrestler to reach the positive kachi-koshi balance with a win over Shōhōzan. For this feat and his 10 wins in total, he was nominated for the Fighting Spirit Award, but was shelved because he did not reach the majority of the attending committee members votes. In May 2019, he notably defeated ōzeki Gōeidō on Day 11 and earned a tenth victory by defeating komusubi Aoiyama on the last day of the tournament. For this performance, he received his first special prize for Technique. The following tournament, he was promoted to komusubi, a first for a wrestler from Yamanashi Prefecture since Fujizakura, 47 years earlier. His promotion to the san'yaku ranks makes Ryūden the first wrestler in sumo history to earn a promotion to this status after being relegated to jonokuchi. With 79 tournaments elapsed since entering professional sumo, Ryūden is also the 10th slowest wrestler to reach the san'yaku ranks. Entering the July 2019 tournament at his highest rank, Ryūden recorded an initial defeat to yokozuna Kakuryū, but bounced back to claim back-to-back victories over ōzeki Takayasu and Tochinoshin. However, he finished the tournament with a poor 4–11 record and was demoted after only one tournament in san'yaku, remaining in the mid-maegashira ranks until May 2021, where he fell to maegashira 14.

=== Suspension ===
Ryūden was withdrawn from the May 2021 tournament by his stablemaster, after the latter was tipped off by Ryūden's wife about a cheating affair. Takadagawa accused Ryūden of having breached COVID-19 compliance guidelines. After an investigation by the compliance department of the Sumo Association, it was found that on 25 different occasions between 12 March 2020, and 20 January 2021, Ryūden had gone out with several women, breaking the rules on unnecessary trips. Ryūden was therefore suspended for three tournaments retroactive to the May basho; he was eligible to compete again in November.

=== Return to competition ===
When Ryūden competed again after his suspension in November 2021, he entered the competition at the rank of makushita 47. He commented that since the Sumo Association had let him continue to fight, he now had no choice but to fight without shame, while staying away from the press for a while. Ryūden won the makushita division title with a perfect 7–0 record. Thanks to his championship victory, he was promoted to makushita 5 and during this period he was competing to win a second tournament in a row but was beaten on the final day by Gōnoyama (then called Nishikawa). He however earned a promotion to the jūryō division for the March 2022 tournament, where he won his first championship in that division. After the May tournament of the same year, where he scored a 9–6 record, he won the jūryō division again in July, leading to his promotion back to the makuuchi division. On his return to sumo's top division, he finished just a few victories behind the tournament winner (junyūshō), maegashira Tamawashi, notably achieving a seven-match winning streak. Ryūden was subsequently promoted to maegashira 6.

== Fighting style ==
Ryūden is a yotsu sumo specialist who prefers grappling techniques. His favourite winning kimarite is yori-kiri, with a moro-zashi hold, or both arms inside his opponent's.

== Personal life ==
In February 2019, Ryūden announced his engagement to his partner, a nurse named Mai Fukumaru, after a four-year relationship. The couple married in June of the same year, with 430 guests in attendance. In May 2021, it was revealed by the Shūkan Shinchō, alongside the investigation into the breached COVID-19 compliance guidelines, that Ryūden was having an affair with one of his fans. It was also revealed that as a result of this relationship, the woman in question became pregnant and had, at Ryūden's insistence, an abortion; Ryūden had tried to pay her approximately 5 million yen in compensation, in vain.

== Career record ==
Ryūden Gōshi
Year	January Hatsu basho, Tokyo	March Haru basho, Osaka	May Natsu basho, Tokyo	July Nagoya basho, Nagoya	September Aki basho, Tokyo	November Kyūshū basho, Fukuoka
2006	x	(Maezumō)	West Jonokuchi #28; 4–3	West Jonidan #120; 6–1	West Jonidan #39; 3–4	West Jonidan #59; 5–2
2007	East Jonidan #20; 4–3	West Sandanme #100; 4–3	West Sandanme #81; 3–4	West Sandanme #91; 5–2	West Sandanme #60; 5–2	West Sandanme #34; 3–4
2008	West Sandanme #49; 6–1	West Makushita #59; 2–5	West Sandanme #21; 3–4	West Sandanme #36; 4–3	East Sandanme #20; 6–1	West Makushita #42; 3–4
2009	East Makushita #52; 6–1	West Makushita #25; 2–5	East Makushita #38; 3–4	West Makushita #46; 6–1	West Makushita #19; 4–3	East Makushita #15; 5–2
2010	West Makushita #9; 3–4	East Makushita #15; 2–5	East Makushita #29; 4–3	West Makushita #24; 2–5	East Makushita #39; 3–4	East Makushita #46; 5–2
2011	East Makushita #33; 4–3	East Makushita #27; Tournament Cancelled; Match fixing investigation 0–0–0	East Makushita #27; 4–3	West Makushita #14; 3–4	West Makushita #17; 5–2	West Makushita #8; 4–3
2012	West Makushita #6; 2–5	West Makushita #14; 6–1	East Makushita #5; 3–4	West Makushita #8; 3–4	West Makushita #12; 7–0; Champion	West Jūryō #12; 4–5–6
2013	East Makushita #4; 2–5	East Makushita #10; Sat out due to injury 0–0–7	West Makushita #50; Sat out due to injury 0–0–7	West Sandanme #30; 1–2–4	East Sandanme #69; Sat out due to injury 0–0–7	East Jonidan #30; Sat out due to injury 0–0–7
2014	West Jonokuchi #10; 1–0–6	West Jonokuchi #7; 1–0–6	East Jonokuchi #1; 1–0–6	East Jonokuchi #14; 1–0–6	West Jonokuchi #17; 7–0; Champion	West Jonidan #11; 7–0; Champion
2015	East Sandanme #20; 7–0; Champion	East Makushita #14; 2–5	East Makushita #28; 6–1	East Makushita #10; 2–5	East Makushita #25; 5–2	West Makushita #11; 4–3
2016	East Makushita #9; 3–4	West Makushita #13; 6–1	East Makushita #3; 3–4	East Makushita #7; 5–2	West Makushita #2; 4–3	East Jūryō #13; 9–6
2017	West Jūryō #10; 9–6	West Jūryō #8; 6–9	East Jūryō #12; 9–6	West Jūryō #8; 9–6	East Jūryō #5; 8–7	West Jūryō #2; 8–7
2018	East Maegashira #16; 10–5; F	West Maegashira #9; 8–7	East Maegashira #7; 3–12	West Maegashira #15; 8–7	East Maegashira #13; 10–5	West Maegashira #3; 6–9
2019	East Maegashira #7; 6–9	East Maegashira #11; 10–5	West Maegashira #5; 10–5; T	West Komusubi #1; 4–11	West Maegashira #5; 7–8	West Maegashira #5; 6–9
2020	West Maegashira #8; 10–5	East Maegashira #5; 6–9	West Maegashira #6; Tournament Cancelled; State of Emergency; 0–0–0	West Maegashira #6; 7–8	East Maegashira #7; 6–9	East Maegashira #10; 9–6
2021	East Maegashira #6; 4–11	West Maegashira #10; 6–9	East Maegashira #14; Suspended; 0–0–15	East Jūryō #9; Suspended; 0–0–15	East Makushita #7; Suspended; 0–0–7	West Makushita #47; 7–0; Champion
2022	East Makushita #5; 6–1	East Jūryō #13; 13–2; Champion	West Jūryō #3; 9–6	East Jūryō #1; 12–3; Champion	West Maegashira #12; 11–4	West Maegashira #6; 9–6
2023	East Maegashira #5; 9–6	West Maegashira #2; 2–13	East Maegashira #10; 5–10	East Maegashira #15; 10–5	West Maegashira #6; 6–9	East Maegashira #10; 10–5
2024	East Maegashira #5; 3–12	East Maegashira #13; 6–9	East Maegashira #14; 10–5	East Maegashira #8; 3–12	East Maegashira #14; 8–7	East Maegashira #13; 4–11
2025	East Jūryō #3; 11–4	East Maegashira #14; 6–9	East Maegashira #15; 5–10	West Jūryō #1; 8–7	East Maegashira #17; 9–6	East Maegashira #14; 7–8
2026	East Maegashira #15; 6–9	East Jūryō #1; 9–6	West Maegashira #16; 5–10	East Jūryō #3; 4–11	East Jūryō #8; 9–6	East Jūryō #5; 4–11
Record given as wins–losses–absences Top division champion Top division runner-up Retired Non-participation Jūryō Lower divisions Sanshō key: F=Fighting spirit; O=Outstanding performance; T=Technique Also shown: ★=Kinboshi; P=Playoff(s); Divisions: Makuuchi — Jūryō — Makushita — Sandanme — Jonidan — Jonokuchi Makuuchi ranks: Yokozuna — Ōzeki — Sekiwake — Komusubi — Maegashira

== See also ==
- Glossary of sumo terms
- List of active sumo wrestlers
- List of active special prize winners
- List of sumo top division runners-up
- List of sumo second division champions
- List of komusubi
