= Taishi (given name) =

- Gender: Male

Origin
- Origin: Japanese
- Meaning: Different meanings depending on the kanji used

Taishi (written: 大志, 大司, 泰志, 泰士 or 泰史) is a masculine Japanese given name. Notable people with the name include:

- Taishi Hirooka (廣岡 大志; born 1997), Japanese professional baseball infielder
- Taishi Kagayaki (輝 大士; born 1994), Japanese sumo wrestler
- Taishi Kusumoto (楠本 泰史; born 1995), Japanese professional baseball player
- Taishi Matsumoto (松本 泰志; born 1998), Japanese footballer
- Taishi Mori (モリ タイシ; born 1976), Japanese manga artist
- Taishi Murata (村田 太志; born 1982), Japanese voice actor
- Taishi Nakagawa (中川 大志; born 1998), Japanese actor
- Taishi Nakagawa (baseball) (中川 大志; born 1990), Japanese professional baseball player
- Taishi Narikuni (成国 大志; born 1997), Japanese freestyle wrestler
- Taishi Nishioka (西岡 大志; born 1994), Japanese football player
- Taishi Brandon Nozawa (野澤 大志 ブランドン; born 2002), Japanese professional footballer
- Taishi Ohta (大田 泰示; born 1990), Japanese professional baseball outfielder
- Taishi Onodera (小野寺 太志; born 1996), Japanese volleyball player
- Taishi Semba (仙波 大志; born 1999), Japanese professional footballer
- Taishi Sunagawa (砂川 太志; born 1990), Japanese football player
- Taishi Taguchi (田口 泰士; born 1991), Japanese footballer
- Taishi Takizawa (滝澤 大志; born 1985), Japanese professional wrestler
- Taishi Tsukamoto (塚本 泰史; born 1985), Japanese footballer
- Taishi Tsunada (綱田 大志; born 1984), Japanese football player
