= Noyan =

Mongol nobility title

Noyan (from Classical Mongolian ᠨᠣᠶᠠᠨ 'lord, master') was a title of authority, which was used to refer to civil-military leaders of noble ancestry in the Central Asian khanates. The title was originally used for hereditary chieftains and later as a noble rank in the Mongol Empire. The title's function and meaning has changed over time and depending on the region/state it was used in, and there is still some debate on its precise definition at a given time.

In modern times, it is used as a given name or surname in Asia, meaning 'lord', 'prince' 'nobleman', 'leader (of a group)' or 'protector'.

== Pre-Genghisid period ==
Initially, Noyan was a title for chieftains of Mongolian nomad communities.

== Mongol Empire and successor states ==
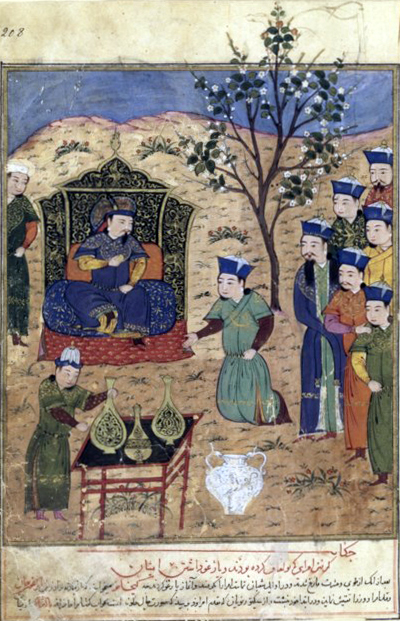
Shiktur (center), Noyan during the Persian Ilkhanate

Under Genghis Khan the term "Noyon" applied to leaders of Tumens and Mingghans, civil and military units of 10,000 and 1,000 households respectively, each of them with one recruitable soldier. In times of peace the Noyons ruled as lords over these households and governed the use of the pasture lands. In times of war they led the warriors of their Tumens and Mingghans. During conquests, Noyons used to receive territories for administration and they effectively became aristocracy, into the 20th century. Noyons were above the ordinary Mongols in social rank but below the descendants of Genghis Khan. The title was used similarly by the Dzungars, except that the title Noyon was reserved to higher nobles who were part of hereditary ruling lineages with other titles (e.g. "otog", "zaisang", and "demchis") being used for lower commanders. Noyons were sometimes called emir or bey in the Ulus of Jochi, the Ilkhanate and the Chagatai Khanate. In the Tarikh-i Jahangushay , Ata-Malik Juvayni refers to Tolui as "Uluy-Noyan" ("the great Noyan", with uluy coming from Turkish). John Boyle has proposed that this was an honorary title used posthumously to avoid naming the deceased.

In the Yuan dynasty, Noyan was used to refer to all royal nobles or non-royal nobles serving as high generals or officers. Alternatively, the title was also used in certain cases as an honorary title without a formal post, for example, under Kublai Khan, Üs Temür (a grandson of Bo'orchu) was named Örlög Noyan ("competent noble"). Historical records of the Yuan and Ming dynasties gave the equivalent as guanren (官人). Under the reign of Dayan Khan (1480-1517) and his successor Bars Bolud Jinong (1517-1519), non-royal leaders were replaced by royal family members. The title guanren (which had until then be used as an equivalent to noyan) was then imported (as "qonĵin") into Inner Mongolia to designate non-royal nobility (replacing other titles like Taishi or čingsang).

Usually, "Noyon" followed the name of a person similar to the usage of the title "Khan" or "Bey".

== Qing dynasty ==
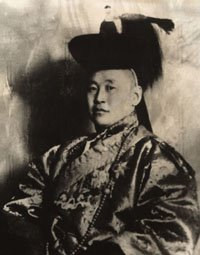
Tögs-Ochiryn Namnansüren, also called "Good Noyan Khan Namnansuren" in the Mongolian language

The Qing dynasty of China, which ruled Mongolia from 1694 to 1911, entrusted rule in Mongolia to the descendants of Genghis Khan, who were also called Noyon. The term Noyon in this epoch acquired the connotation of nobleman, since Mongolia was mostly at peace. After 1921 the word Darga (boss) replaced the aristocratic Noyon as the term for officials.

== Bogd Khanate of Mongolia ==
In the Bogd Khanate, the title "casaγtu noyan" was used for small-scale rulers governing regions who descended from Genghis Khan.

== Modern Mongolia ==
In modern Mongolian, the word is used as a form of address similar to "Mister" or "Monsieur".

== Religious context ==
In the Mongolian shamanism and folk religion the Noyad are a class of local spirits. They are regarded as descendants of gods or clan elders.

Noyon is also used as an honorary title in Mongolian Buddhism for the incarnation line of the Noyon Khutagt.

== Notable Noyons ==
- Qarachar Barlas
- Qubilai Barlas
- Ichil Barlas
- Baiju
- Chormaqan
- Jebe
- Subutai
- Dulduityn Danzanravjaa (the Fifth Noyon Khutagt)
- Muqali
- Boroldai*
- Taghachar*
- Tygyn Darkhan

== Other meanings ==
Noyan (Bengali name): A common Bangladeshi variant of the first name Nayan, meaning "eyes". The name is of Sanskrit origin (Nayana / नयन). It represents, among other things, wisdom, deep insight and understanding. Another common spelling in Bangladesh is Noyon.
