= Akinoshima Katsumi =

Japanese sumo wrestler

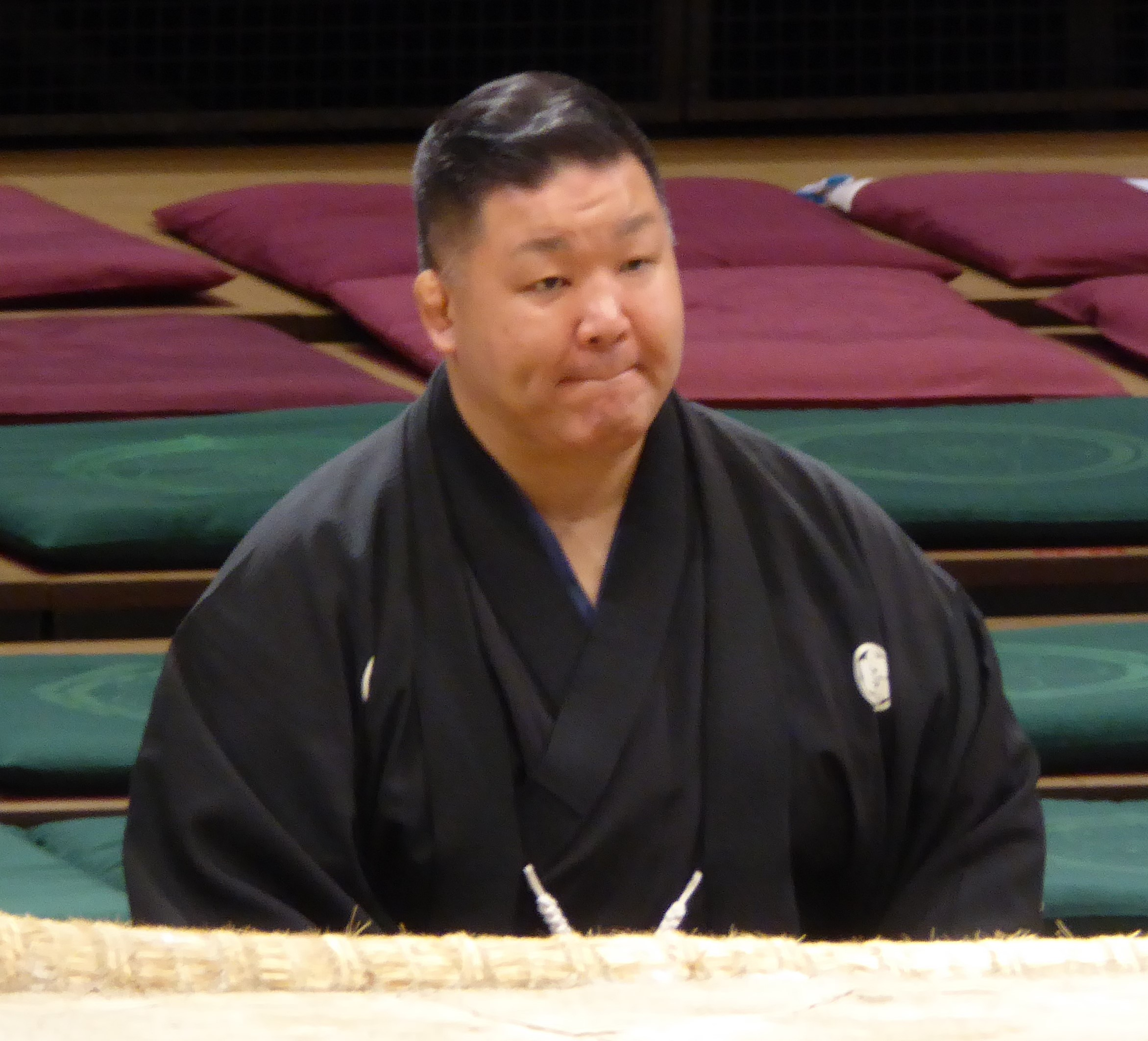

Personal information
- Native name: 安芸乃島 勝巳
- Born: Katsumi Yamanaka; 16 March 1967 (age 59) Hiroshima, Japan
- Height: 1.75 m (5 ft 9 in)
- Weight: 158 kg (348 lb)

Sport
- Sport: Sumo
- Retired: May, 2003
- Heya: Futagoyama
- Record: 822-757-78
- Debut: March, 1982
- Highest rank: Sekiwake (May, 1989)
- Elder name: Takadagawa
- Championships: 1 (Jūryō); 1 (Makushita); 1 (Jonidan)
- Special Prizes: Outstanding Performance (7); Fighting Spirit (8); Technique (4)
- Gold Stars: 16; Chiyonofuji (4); Hokutoumi (4); Asahifuji (4); Ōnokuni (2); Akebono; Musashimaru
- Updated on July 2007

Akinoshima Katsumi (born 16 March 1967 as Katsumi Yamanaka) is a former sumo wrestler from Akitsu, Hiroshima Prefecture, Japan. He made his professional debut in 1982, and after reaching the top division in 1988 he remained there for 15 years. His highest rank was sekiwake. He was known as the "giant killer" having defeated more yokozuna than any other untitled wrestler (maegashira) in the history of sumo, earning himself 16 gold stars or kinboshi over his career, four more than his nearest kinboshi earning rivals, Takamiyama and Tochinonada. He also has received 19 performance prizes (sanshō), another record in sumo history.

Akinoshima was a member of Futagoyama stable and was a stablemate of the wrestling brothers Takanohana II and Wakanohana III during their rise in sumo and subsequent yokozuna reigns. Akinoshima was a wrestler always capable of surprise wins, but lacked consistency, spending most of his career as a maegashira. After his retirement in 2003 he became an elder of the Japan Sumo Association and in 2009 he became head coach of the Takadagawa stable.

== Early years ==
Though he practiced judo in his junior high school years, Yamanaka had dreamed from a very young age of becoming a sumo wrestler, and eventually was able to enter a sumo competition while still in junior high school. Sometime later, he had a chance meeting with then ōzeki Takanohana I on one of the ōzeki's visits to Hiroshima. Yamanaka was invited to join Takanohana's stable, Futagoyama-beya (then known as Fujishima-beya). Making his professional debut in March 1982, he reached the third highest makushita division in March 1985. After winning the makushita championship with a perfect 7-0 record in May 1987 he made his second division jūryō debut that July, and entered the top division makuuchi in March 1988, just days shy of his 20th birthday.

== Career ==
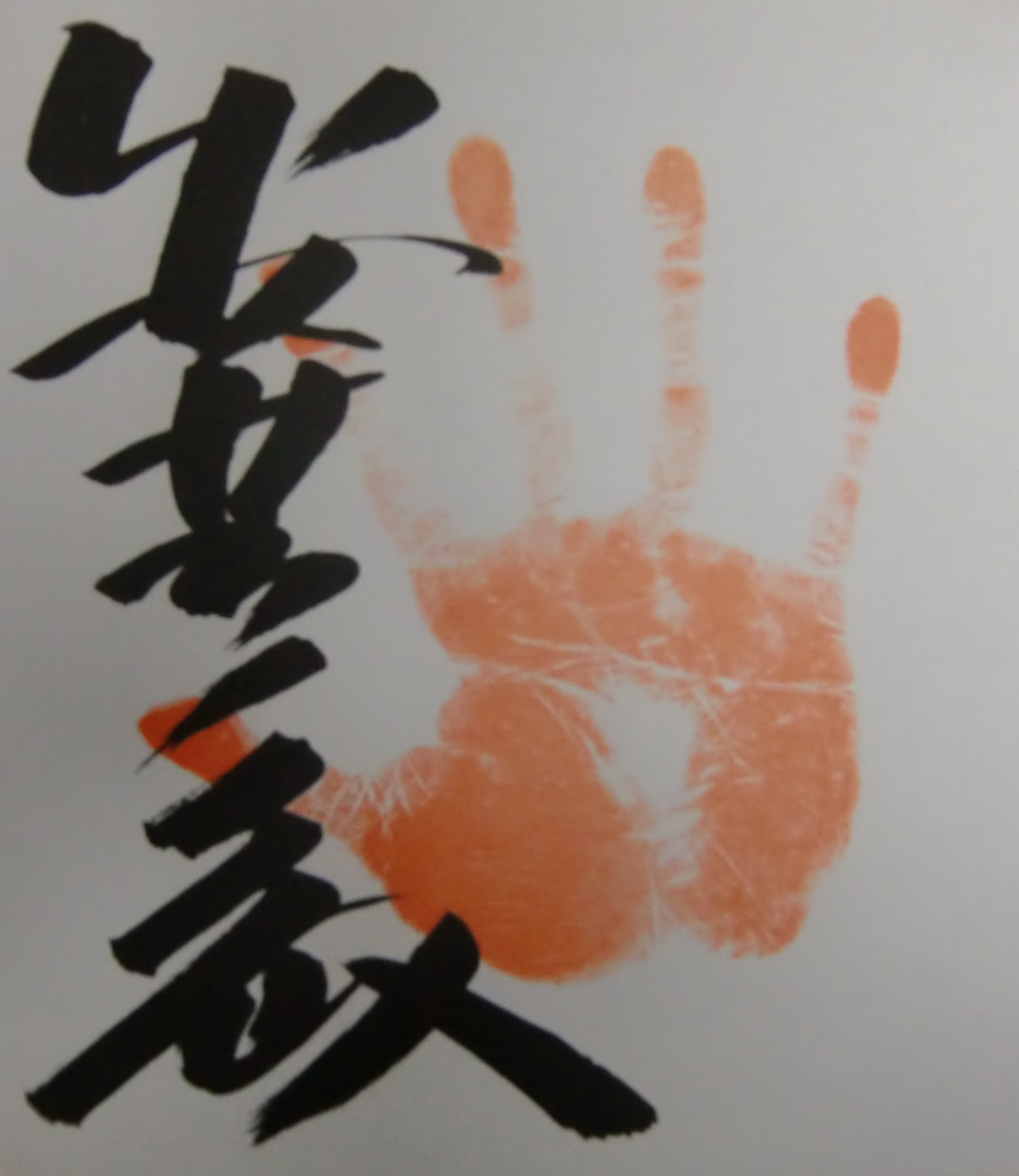
Akinoshima's tegata

Akinoshima received his first kinboshi on his defeat of the yokozuna Ōnokuni in September 1988. He went on to receive at least one kinboshi from every yokozuna he faced. He won 14 of his 16 kinboshi in a period of just four years from 1988 to 1992, and he would earn only two more in the last 11 years of his top division career. It is notable that due to sumo rules, Akinoshima never faced his stablemates, Wakanohana and Takanohana in the sumo ring. Had he had this chance, he might have attained even more kinboshi than his already unrivaled record. His record of 16 kinboshi is four clear of his nearest rival. He also had a remarkable hold over the ōzeki Konishiki, whom he defeated in every one of their first seven meetings, and he had a 25–10 overall career advantage over him.

He had an ongoing rivalry with another maegashira star Kotonishiki, and managed to chalk up only a 9–39 win–loss record against him during their respective top division careers. Only three wrestlers in the history of sumo have ever lost more times to another than Akinoshima did against Kotonishiki. He won his last bout against Kotonishiki in March 2000, but injured his elbow in the win. Ironically, this injury would be one factor that led to his eventual retirement in May 2003. After losing to Iwakiyama on the 14th day of the tournament he faced certain demotion to jūryō and announced his retirement with immediate effect, not appearing on the final day. He was the last top division wrestler from the Shōwa era to retire.

He competed in the top division for 91 tournaments, which at the time of his retirement was the third highest in history, after Takamiyama and Terao. He never won a top division tournament title, his best result being 12–3 in March 1992 when he finished runner-up to Konishiki. He was ranked in the titled san'yaku ranks for 27 tournaments, 15 at komusubi and 12 at sekiwake. However, he was never consistent enough to earn promotion to ōzeki, often dropping matches to less talented opponents.

He won his nineteenth sanshō or special prize in 1999, breaking the record of eighteen held by his rival Kotonishiki. The last two came in September 1999, a tournament in which he was also runner-up for the second time.

He was an extremely diligent trainer, setting himself the target of one hundred practice bouts every day. He suffered a severe shoulder injury in 1995, which required surgery.

== Fighting style ==
Akinoshima favoured yotsu-sumo or grappling techniques, preferring to fight at close quarters rather than thrust to the chest. His favourite grip on the mawashi was hidari-yotsu, with his right hand outside and left hand inside his opponent's arms. His most common winning kimarite was yori-kiri or force out, but he also regularly used throws, both overarm (uwatenage) and underarm (shitatenage). He was known for his excellent balance, and for his ability to bury his head into his opponent's body, making him almost impossible to shake off.

When he first entered the top division in 1988 his weight was around 130 kg (290 lb), below average, but this gradually increased, and peaked at 158 kg (348 lb) towards the end of his career.

== Retirement ==
Upon retirement, Akinoshima became a coach (oyakata) at his stable under the name Fujishima. But disagreements with stablemaster Takanohana II over how to run the stable would eventually lead to Akinoshima moving to coach at Takadagawa stable instead, a fairly rare occurrence in the world of sumo. He became Sendagawa-oyakata. He took over the running of Takadagawa stable from former ōzeki Maenoyama in August 2009. In September 2012 he oversaw the promotion of Ryūden to jūryō, the stable's first sekitori since Dairaidō in 2006. In January 2016 Kagayaki reached the top division, joined by Ryūden in January 2018.

In March 2024, he was elected director of the Japan Sumo Association for the first time, his term of office to run until 2026.

== Personal life ==
Akinoshima was known for often avoiding interviews after big wins even though an interview immediately after a big win is a long time sumo tradition. Akinoshima would refuse saying that it was disrespectful to the defeated wrestler.

He is a big fan of The Rolling Stones and was appointed their "ambassador" by Warner Music Japan. He invited The Rolling Stones to his retirement ceremony at the Ryōgoku Kokugikan in January 2004, but they were unable to attend.

Unusually for someone in the sumo world, he does not drink alcohol.

The Sumo Association announced on 25 April 2020 that Akinoshima and five other wrestlers, including a jūryō wrestler in Takadagawa stable, were being hospitalized after testing positive for COVID-19.

== Career record ==
Akinoshima Katsumi
Year	January Hatsu basho, Tokyo	March Haru basho, Osaka	May Natsu basho, Tokyo	July Nagoya basho, Nagoya	September Aki basho, Tokyo	November Kyūshū basho, Fukuoka
1982	x	(Maezumo)	West Jonokuchi #17; 6–1–P	East Jonidan #82; 7–0–P; Champion	West Sandanme #73; 3–4	West Jonidan #1; 5–2
1983	East Sandanme #55; 4–3	East Sandanme #43; 2–5	East Sandanme #72; 3–4	East Sandanme #85; 6–1	East Sandanme #27; 5–2	East Sandanme #1; 1–6
1984	East Sandanme #32; 4–3	East Sandanme #20; 3–4	West Sandanme #36; 5–2	West Sandanme #4; 1–6	East Sandanme #39; 4–3	West Sandanme #23; 3–4
1985	West Sandanme #40; 6–1	East Makushita #56; 5–2	East Makushita #34; 5–2	West Makushita #21; 5–2	West Makushita #11; 3–4	East Makushita #20; 3–4
1986	West Makushita #29; 5–2	West Makushita #15; 2–5	East Makushita #33; 6–1	East Makushita #15; 3–4	West Makushita #25; 6–1	West Makushita #7; 2–5
1987	East Makushita #20; 5–2	East Makushita #9; 3–4	West Makushita #14; 7–0; Champion	East Jūryō #12; 8–7	West Jūryō #10; 8–7	West Jūryō #6; 9–6
1988	East Jūryō #4; 12–3; Champion	East Maegashira #12; 7–8	East Jūryō #1; 10–5	West Maegashira #10; 11–4; F	East Maegashira #2; 8–7; O★	West Komusubi #1; 7–8
1989	East Maegashira #1; 7–8 ★	West Maegashira #1; 8–7; F	West Sekiwake #1; 6–9	East Maegashira #1; 7–8 ★★	East Maegashira #2; 7–8 ★★	West Maegashira #2; 5–10
1990	West Maegashira #6; 8–7	West Maegashira #2; 8–7; O★★	East Maegashira #1; 10–5; OT★	East Sekiwake #1; 9–6; F	East Sekiwake #1; 6–9	East Maegashira #1; 10–5; O★★
1991	East Komusubi #1; 5–10	West Maegashira #3; 8–7 ★	East Maegashira #1; 9–6; F★	East Komusubi #1; 8–7	East Komusubi #1; 9–6	West Sekiwake #1; 4–11
1992	East Maegashira #5; 8–7 ★	West Maegashira #2; 12–3; FO	East Komusubi #1; 9–6	East Sekiwake #1; 10–5	East Sekiwake #1; 8–7	East Sekiwake #2; 7–8
1993	East Maegashira #1; 9–6	West Sekiwake #1; 0–2–13	East Maegashira #10; Sat out due to injury 0–0–15	East Maegashira #10; 9–6; O★	West Maegashira #2; 9–6	West Komusubi #1; 6–9
1994	East Maegashira #2; 4–11	East Maegashira #10; 9–6	East Maegashira #3; 3–12	East Maegashira #14; 8–7	West Maegashira #13; 11–4	West Maegashira #4; 10–5
1995	East Komusubi #1; 11–4; F	West Sekiwake #1; 11–4; F	East Sekiwake #1; 7–8	East Komusubi #1; 1–2–12	West Maegashira #7; Sat out due to injury 0–0–15	West Maegashira #7; 8–7
1996	East Maegashira #4; 9–6	West Komusubi #1; 6–9	East Maegashira #2; 5–10	West Maegashira #5; 10–5	West Maegashira #1; 7–8	East Maegashira #2; 9–6
1997	West Komusubi #1; 6–9	East Maegashira #2; 7–8	West Maegashira #2; 7–8	East Maegashira #3; 6–9	East Maegashira #5; 8–7	West Komusubi #1; 7–8
1998	West Maegashira #1; 6–9	West Maegashira #2; 9–6	West Komusubi #1; 10–5; T	East Sekiwake #1; 3–4–8	West Maegashira #5; Sat out due to injury 0–0–15	West Maegashira #5; 8–7
1999	East Maegashira #3; 11–4; T	East Komusubi #2; 11–4; O	East Sekiwake #1; 6–9	West Maegashira #1; 6–9 ★	West Maegashira #3; 11–4; FT	West Komusubi #1; 3–12
2000	West Maegashira #4; 7–8	East Maegashira #5; 5–10	West Maegashira #7; 10–5	East Maegashira #1; 8–7	East Komusubi #1; 7–8	East Maegashira #1; 5–10
2001	East Maegashira #4; 7–8	East Maegashira #5; 5–10	West Maegashira #9; 8–7	East Maegashira #6; 4–11	West Maegashira #11; 9–6	West Maegashira #6; 8–7
2002	West Maegashira #1; 6–9	East Maegashira #4; 7–8	East Maegashira #5; 3–12	West Maegashira #11; 6–9	East Maegashira #13; 7–8	East Maegashira #14; 9–6
2003	West Maegashira #9; 6–9	West Maegashira #12; 6–9	West Maegashira #15; Retired; 6–9	x	x	x
Record given as wins–losses–absences Top division champion Top division runner-up Retired Lower divisions Non-participation Sanshō key: F=Fighting spirit; O=Outstanding performance; T=Technique Also shown: ★=Kinboshi; P=Playoff(s); Divisions: Makuuchi — Jūryō — Makushita — Sandanme — Jonidan — Jonokuchi Makuuchi ranks: Yokozuna — Ōzeki — Sekiwake — Komusubi — Maegashira

== See also ==
- Glossary of sumo terms
- List of sumo record holders
- List of sumo tournament top division runners-up
- List of sumo tournament second division champions
- List of past sumo wrestlers
- List of sumo elders
- List of sekiwake
