= Maenoyama Tarō =

Sumo wrestler (1945–2021)

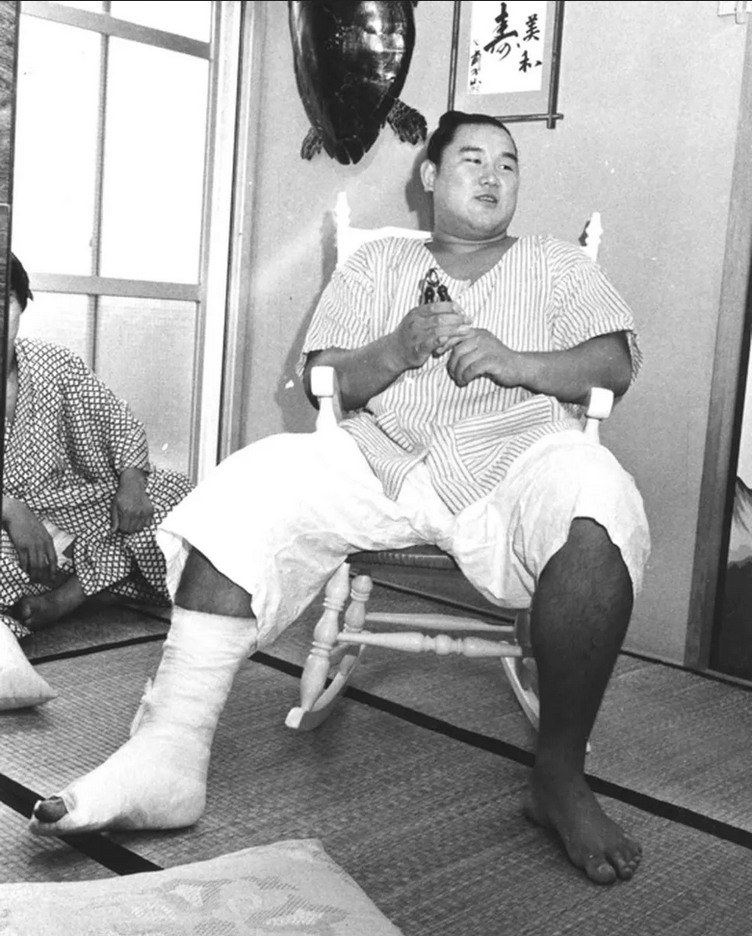
- Maenoyama Tarō, just promoted to ōzeki, having to sit out his first tournament at the rank because of a broken right ankle (1970)

Personal information
- Native name: 前の山 太郎
- Born: Kazuichi Kaneshima; 9 March 1945 Osaka, Japan
- Died: 11 March 2021 (aged 76)
- Height: 1.87 m (6 ft 1 1/2 in)
- Weight: 130 kg (290 lb)

Sport
- Sport: Sumo
- Retired: March, 1974
- Heya: Takasago
- Record: 487–397–48
- Debut: March, 1961
- Highest rank: Ōzeki (September, 1970)
- Elder name: Takadagawa → Sendagawa
- Championships: 1 (Jūryō)
- Special Prizes: Fighting Spirit (2); Outstanding Performance (3)
- Gold Stars: 1 (Kashiwado)
- Updated on 29 March 2021

Maenoyama Tarō (前の山 太郎; born as Kazuichi Kaneshima (金島和一, Kaneshima Kazuichi), 9 March 1945 – 11 March 2021) was a sumo wrestler from Osaka Prefecture, Japan. He began his career in 1961, reaching the top makuuchi division in 1966. His highest rank was ōzeki which he held from 1970 until 1972. He retired in 1974 and became head coach of the Takadagawa stable. He left the Sumo Association in 2010 upon turning 65.

== Career ==
He was born in Niwakubo Town in Kitakawachi-un, Osaka Prefecture (the town has now been incorporated into Moriguchi City), and was of Korean descent. He entered Takasago stable and made his professional debut in March 1961. He reached sekitori status in November 1965 upon promotion to the jūryō division and reached the top makuuchi division in September 1966. He made his san'yaku debut in March 1968 at sekiwake. In May 1969 he defeated yokozuna Kashiwado on opening day and went on to win 11 bouts, receiving his first sanshō or special prize, for Fighting Spirit. He was promoted to sumo's second highest rank of ōzeki in July 1970 after two consecutive runner-up performances to yokozuna Kitanofuji, the second coming in a play-off. His ōzeki debut in September 1970 was inauspicious as he had injured his right foot in training and had to miss the entire tournament through injury. He returned in November to score 9–6 and keep his rank, but the foot injury continued to trouble him, and he was unable to win more than nine bouts in any of his ten tournaments at ōzeki rank. He was demoted from ōzeki in March 1972 after two consecutive losing scores. His Day 12 win over Kotozakura in this tournament was criticized by the Japan Sumo Association as being an example of mukiryoku or "unmotivated" sumo, a euphemism for yaocho or match-fixing, as his fellow ōzeki opponent had shown little resistance. It was unprecedented for the Sumo Association to publicly warn wrestlers in this way. Maenoyama withdrew after this bout and his resulting 6–7–2 record confirmed his demotion. He would have been promoted back to ōzeki if he had won at least ten bouts in the following tournament, but he scored only 7–8. He continued to compete in the lower ranks until March 1974, when he announced his retirement from active competition at the age of 29.

== Retirement from sumo ==
He became an elder of the Japan Sumo Association under the name Takadagawa and established the Takadagawa stable in April 1974. He produced such top division wrestlers as komusubi Maenoshin and Kenko, and maegashira Kiraihō. It was once part of the Takasago ichimon (group of stables). However, the stable became a pariah after Takadagawa ran for the leadership of the Sumo Association in 1998 against the wishes of the Takasago ichimon. As a result, he was forced to leave the Takasago camp. There was some belief that he would join the Dewanoumi group but instead the stable went independent. In December 2008 it was announced that former sekiwake Akinoshima would be his successor. Takadagawa stood down in August 2009 to ease the transition. The two swapped elder names, and he became Sendagawa Oyakata. He left the Japan Sumo Association in March 2010 upon reaching the mandatory retirement age of 65. He died of multiple organ failure on 11 March 2021 at the age of 76. After the family funeral was held, the Japan Sumo Association announced his death on 29 March.

== Fighting style ==
Maenoyama's favourite techniques were tsukidashi (thrust out), hidari-yotsu (a right hand outside, left hand inside grip on his opponent's mawashi) and yorikiri (force out).

== Career record ==
Maenoyama Tarō
Year	January Hatsu basho, Tokyo	March Haru basho, Osaka	May Natsu basho, Tokyo	July Nagoya basho, Nagoya	September Aki basho, Tokyo	November Kyūshū basho, Fukuoka
1961	x	(Maezumo)	West Jonokuchi #26; Sat out due to injury 0–0–7	(Maezumo)	East Jonokuchi #21; Sat out due to injury 0–0–7	(Maezumo)
1962	West Jonokuchi #25; 5–2	West Jonidan #62; 5–2	West Jonidan #25; 6–1	West Sandanme #63; 2–5	East Sandanme #83; 5–2	West Sandanme #52; 2–5
1963	East Sandanme #71; 5–2	East Sandanme #28; 4–3	East Sandanme #18; 3–4	East Sandanme #27; 3–4	West Sandanme #40; 5–2	East Sandanme #11; 5–2
1964	West Makushita #83; 5–2	East Makushita #62; 4–3	East Makushita #57; 5–2	East Makushita #43; 3–4	East Makushita #49; 3–4	East Makushita #53; 6–1
1965	East Makushita #30; 4–3	West Makushita #22; 4–3	East Makushita #17; 4–3	East Makushita #14; 5–2	East Makushita #5; 5–2	West Jūryō #18; 10–5
1966	East Jūryō #10; 6–9	West Jūryō #14; 8–7	East Jūryō #12; 9–6	East Jūryō #6; 13–2–P; Champion	West Maegashira #14; 8–7	East Maegashira #9; 11–4
1967	West Maegashira #1; 4–11	East Maegashira #8; 9–6	West Maegashira #3; 4–11	East Maegashira #5; 9–6	East Maegashira #2; 4–11	East Maegashira #8; 10–5
1968	East Maegashira #2; 9–6	West Sekiwake #1; 7–8	West Maegashira #1; 9–6	East Komusubi #2; 8–7	West Komusubi #1; 9–6	West Sekiwake #1; 8–7
1969	East Sekiwake #1; 5–10	West Maegashira #2; 8–7	West Maegashira #1; 11–4; F★	West Sekiwake #1; 10–5; O	West Sekiwake #1; 8–7	West Sekiwake #2; 8–7
1970	West Sekiwake #2; 8–7	West Sekiwake #2; 9–6; O	East Sekiwake #1; 12–3; O	East Sekiwake #1; 13–2–P; F	West Ōzeki #2; Sat out due to injury 0–0–15	West Ōzeki #2; 9–6
1971	West Ōzeki #2; 9–6	East Ōzeki #2; 8–7	West Ōzeki #2; 8–7	East Ōzeki #2; 8–7	West Ōzeki #2; 8–7	West Ōzeki #2; 8–7
1972	East Ōzeki #2; 3–2–10	East Ōzeki #2; 6–7–2	East Sekiwake #2; 7–8	West Komusubi #1; 8–7	West Komusubi #1; 5–10	West Maegashira #3; 5–4–6
1973	East Maegashira #9; 10–5	West Maegashira #2; 7–8	West Maegashira #3; 4–11	West Maegashira #11; 9–6	East Maegashira #6; 8–7	East Maegashira #4; 8–7
1974	East Maegashira #1; 4–11	West Maegashira #8; Retired; 0–6–9	x	x	x	x
Record given as wins–losses–absences Top division champion Top division runner-up Retired Lower divisions Non-participation Sanshō key: F=Fighting spirit; O=Outstanding performance; T=Technique Also shown: ★=Kinboshi; P=Playoff(s); Divisions: Makuuchi — Jūryō — Makushita — Sandanme — Jonidan — Jonokuchi Makuuchi ranks: Yokozuna — Ōzeki — Sekiwake — Komusubi — Maegashira

== See also ==
- Glossary of sumo terms
- List of sumo tournament top division runners-up
- List of sumo tournament second division champions
- List of past sumo wrestlers
- List of ōzeki
