= Taishi =

Taishi may refer to:

== Names ==
- Taishi (surname), Chinese family name
- Taishi (given name), Japanese given name

== Ranks ==
- Grand Preceptor, ancient Chinese top civilian position: taishi (太师) in Chinese
- Taishi, an alternate name of the Japanese Daijō-daijin
- Taishi (Mongol title), a rank of Mongolian nobility

== Places ==
- Taishi Town (太石镇), town in Lintao County, Gansu, China
- Taishi Township (太石乡), township in Kang County, Gansu, China
- Taishi, Guangzhou, village in Guangdong, China
- Taishi, Hyōgo, town in Hyōgo, Japan
- Taishi, Osaka, town in Osaka, Japan
- Taisi, Yunlin, also known as Taishi, township in Yunlin County, Taiwan

== Historical eras ==
- Taishi (太始, 96BC–93BC), an era name used by Emperor Wu of Han
- Taishi (泰始, 265–274), an era name used by Emperor Wu of Jin
- Taishi (泰始, 465–471), an era name used by Emperor Ming of Liu Song
- Taishi (太始, 551–552), an era name used by Hou Jing
- Taishi (太始, 818), or Taesi, an era name used by Gan of Balhae
