= Takadagawa stable =

Organization of sumo wrestlers

Coordinates: 35.6833°N 139.7961°E

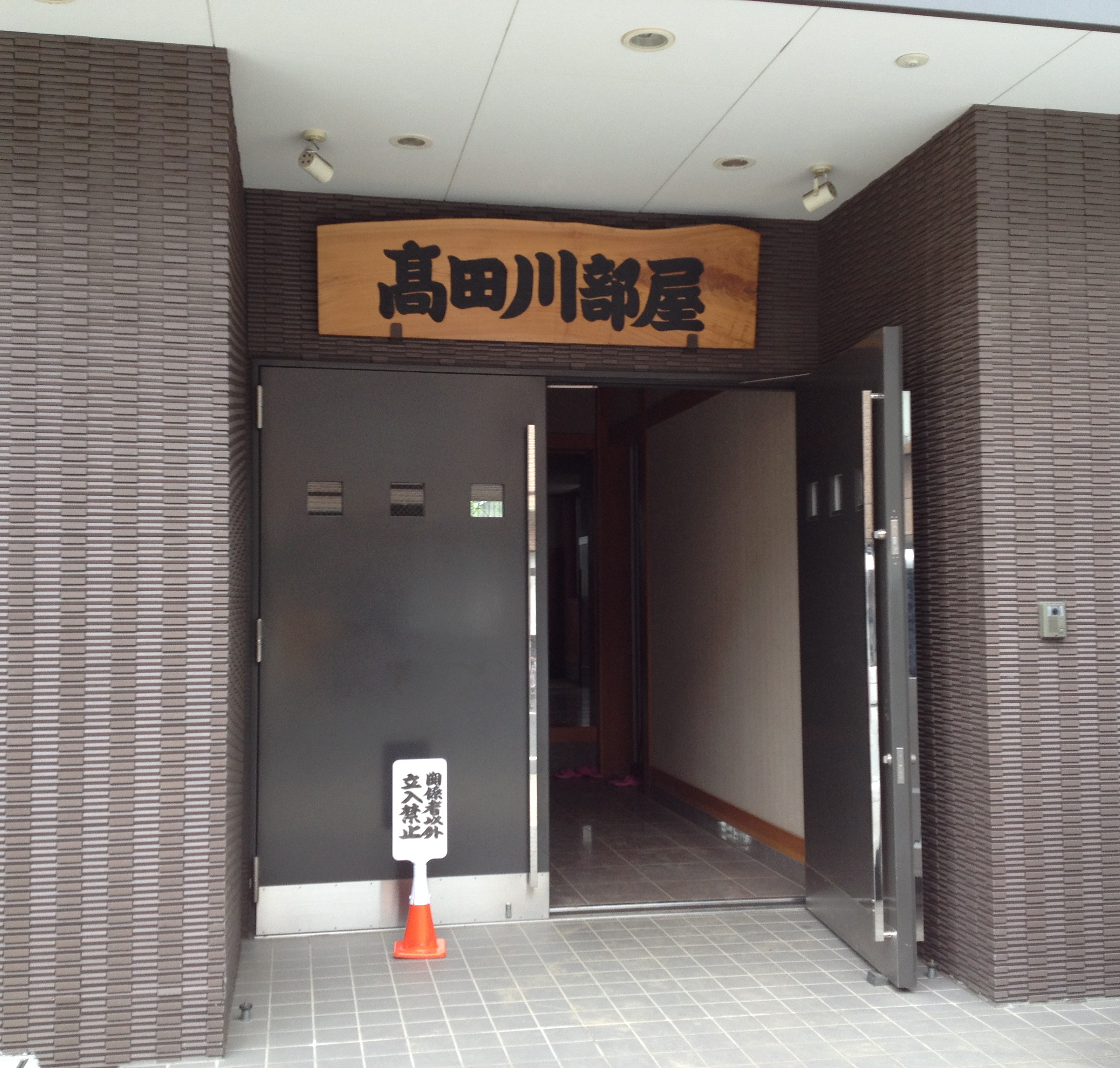

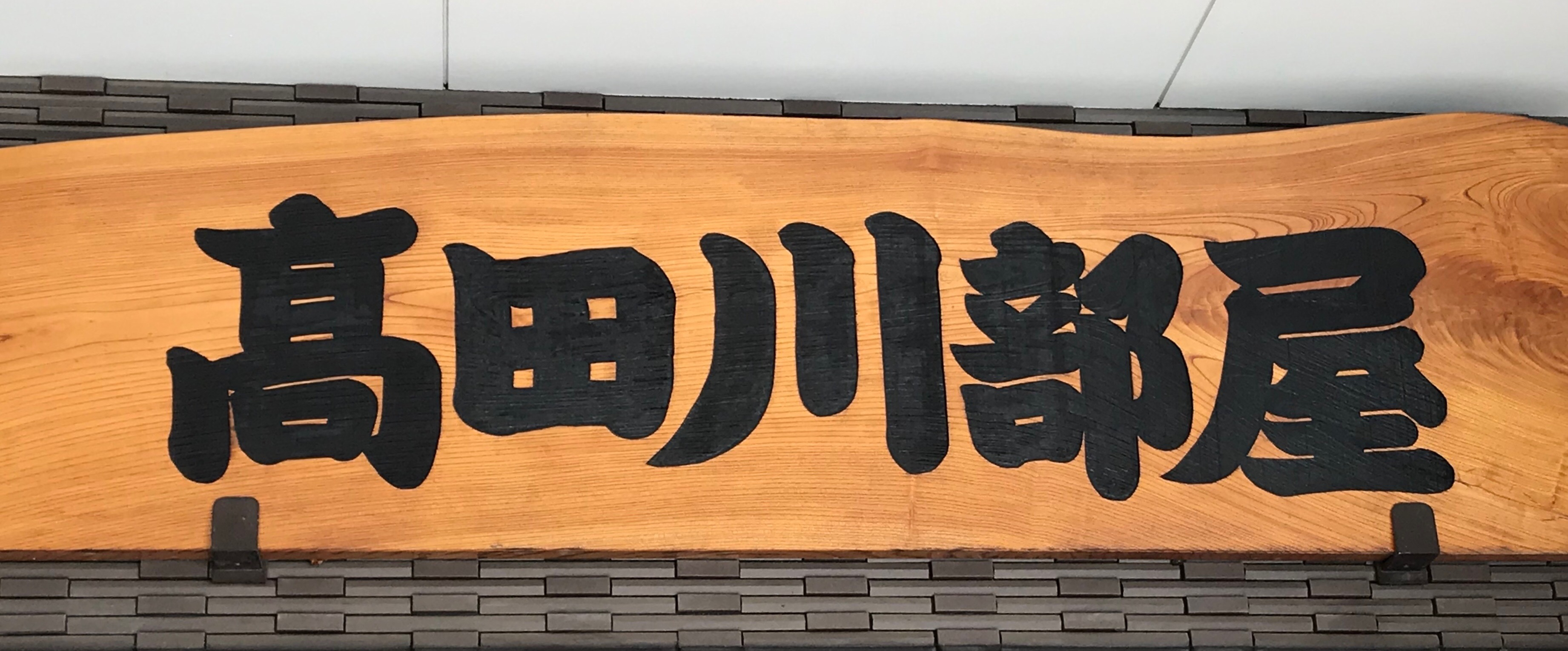

Takadagawa stable (高田川部屋, Takadagawa-beya) is a stable of sumo wrestlers, one of the Nishonoseki ichimon or group of stables. It was formed in 1974 by former ōzeki Maenoyama, and was originally in the Takasago group of stables before joining the Nishonoseki ichimon. A series of wrestlers from Taiwan were recruited in the late 1980s. Later a Mongolian, Maenoyu, was at the stable from 2004 until 2007, but there have been no foreigners recruited since Maenoyu's retirement and the current stablemaster has indicated there are no plans to do in the immediate future.

As of May 2026, the stable has 19 active wrestlers.

== History ==
In 1998, the Japan Sumo Association board election nominated Takadagawa as trustee. However, he did not follow the Takasago clan's candidacy and ran for office by himself, causing a dispute. Takadagawa was excommunicated from the ichimon and the stable became independent. As he was approaching the mandatory retirement age, Maenoyama handed over control to Futagoyama stable's former sekiwake Akinoshima in 2009, as Akinoshima had dissension with the head coach at his stable. In 2011, the stable joined the Nishonoseki ichimon ending nearly thirteen years of non-alignment with an ichimon.

The stable did not have any sekitori between Dairaidō′s last appearance in jūryō in July 2006 and the promotion of Ryūden in September 2012, where he lasted for only one tournament before reaching sekitori again in November 2016. In September 2014 Kagayaki reached jūryō, ending Takadagawa's sekitori drought. Kagayaki went on to reach the top makuuchi division in January 2016, the first Takadagawa wrestler to do so since Kenkō in 1992. Ryūden then reached the top division himself in January 2018.

On 10 April 2020, the Sumo Association announced that an undisclosed wrestler had tested positive for the coronavirus. It was later confirmed to be Shobushi of Takadagawa Stable, a sandanme wrestler who died from coronavirus complications on 13 May 2020. It had also been announced in late April 2020 that seven individuals, including Takadagawa's stablemaster and jūryō wrestler Hakuyozan, were hospitalized after testing positive for the virus. The stable was only one of the 45 stables in sumo not included in the "all-clear" antibody test results issued by the Sumo Association on 6 July 2020. The tate-gyōji at the stable, Shikimori Inosuke, missed the July 2020 tournament with an unspecified illness.

In October 2024 a member of the Tokai University judo club, Ryōtarō Okada, announced that he would be joining Takadagawa Stable, becoming the first judo club member in school history to enter professional sumo. Okada said he was encouraged to become a sumo wrestler by 2020 Summer Olympic gold medalist Aaron Wolf, who trained with Okada as a member of the same judo club.

== Ring name conventions ==
Some wrestlers at this stable have taken ring names or shikona that begin with the characters 安芸 (read: [aki), in deference to their coach and the stable's owner, the former Akinoshima. Examples as of 2017 include Akinohana and Akinoyama.

== Owners ==
- 2009–present: 9th Takadagawa (riji, sekiwake Akinoshima, born 1967)
- 1974–2009: 8th Takadagawa (ōzeki Maenoyama, 1945–2021)

== Coach ==
- Hanakago Tadaaki (san'yo, sekiwake Daijuyama, born 1959)

== Assistant ==
- Zenshinyama (wakaimonogashira, jūryō 2, real name Ryōta Akimoto, born 1966)

== Notable active wrestlers ==
- Ryūden (best rank komusubi, born 1990)
- Kagayaki (best rank maegashira, born 1994)
- Shōnannoumi (best rank maegashira, born 1998)
- Dairaidō (best rank jūryō, born 1980)
- Hakuyozan (best rank jūryō, born 1995)
- Ōtsuji (best rank jūryō, born 2003)

== Notable former members ==
- Maenoshin (komusubi, born 1961)
- Kenkō (komusubi, 1967–1998)
- Kiraihō (maegashira 4, born 1966)
- Shobushi (sandanme 11, 1991–2020)
- 38th Kimura Shōnosuke (real name Hideki Imaoka), chief referee

== Referee ==
- Kimura Mitsunosuke (jūryō gyōji, real name Makoto Kawahara, born 1975)
- Shikimori Tatsunosuke (sandanme gyōji, real name Keisuke Mizutani, born 2000)

== Hairdresser ==
- Tokotetsu (first class tokoyama, born 1972)

== Location and access ==
Tokyo, Kōtō ward, Kiyosumi 2-15-7
2 minute walk from Kiyosumi-shirakawa Station on the Ōedo Line and Hanzōmon Line

== See also ==
- List of sumo stables
- List of active sumo wrestlers
- List of past sumo wrestlers
- Glossary of sumo terms
