= Maenoshin Yasuo =

Japanese sumo wrestler

Personal information
- Native name: 前乃森 康夫
- Born: Yasuo Sawabe; 17 April 1961 (age 65) Chikuho, Fukuoka, Japan
- Height: 1.84 m (6 ft 1/2 in)
- Weight: 141 kg (311 lb)

Sport
- Sport: Sumo
- Retired: March, 1990
- Heya: Takadagawa
- Record: 412-407
- Debut: March, 1977
- Highest rank: Komusubi (September, 1987)
- Elder name: Yamahibiki
- Updated on June 25, 2020

Maenoshin Yasuo (born 17 April 1961 as Yasuo Sawabe) is a former sumo wrestler from Chikuho, Fukuoka, Japan. He made his professional debut in March 1977, and reached the top division in November 1985. His highest rank was komusubi. He retired in March 1990. He became an elder of the Sumo Association under the name Yamahibiki, but was forced to leave his position for disciplinary reasons in January 1997.

== Career record ==
Maenoshin Yasuo
Year	January Hatsu basho, Tokyo	March Haru basho, Osaka	May Natsu basho, Tokyo	July Nagoya basho, Nagoya	September Aki basho, Tokyo	November Kyūshū basho, Fukuoka
1977	x	(Maezumo)	West Jonokuchi #20; 4–3	West Jonidan #87; 4–3	East Jonidan #65; 4–3	West Jonidan #41; 4–3
1978	West Jonidan #23; 4–3	West Sandanme #89; 3–4	East Jonidan #12; 6–1	East Sandanme #50; 3–4	East Sandanme #61; 4–3	West Sandanme #44; 3–4
1979	West Sandanme #56; 4–3	East Sandanme #44; 3–4	East Sandanme #61; 4–3	East Sandanme #45; 4–3	West Sandanme #30; 1–6	East Sandanme #61; 4–3
1980	West Sandanme #45; 4–3	East Sandanme #32; 3–4	East Sandanme #43; 6–1	West Makushita #56; 4–3	West Makushita #43; 3–4	West Makushita #58; 5–2
1981	East Makushita #35; 1–6	East Sandanme #4; 4–3	East Makushita #51; 3–4	West Makushita #59; 4–3	West Makushita #48; 4–3	East Makushita #36; 3–4
1982	West Makushita #43; 5–2	East Makushita #25; 4–3	West Makushita #17; 4–3	West Makushita #14; 3–4	East Makushita #25; 3–4	West Makushita #36; 6–1–PP
1983	West Makushita #16; 3–4	West Makushita #27; 4–3	East Makushita #20; 3–4	West Makushita #28; 5–2	West Makushita #11; 5–2	East Makushita #4; 6–1
1984	East Jūryō #10; 5–10	West Makushita #3; 4–3	West Makushita #2; 4–3	East Jūryō #13; 9–6	West Jūryō #7; 10–5	West Jūryō #4; 8–7
1985	West Jūryō #2; 6–9	West Jūryō #3; 8–7	East Jūryō #2; 8–7	West Jūryō #1; 8–7	East Jūryō #1; 8–7	West Maegashira #14; 8–7
1986	East Maegashira #10; 5–10	East Jūryō #1; 6–9	West Jūryō #4; 6–9	West Jūryō #8; 10–5	East Jūryō #3; 9–6	West Jūryō #1; 8–7
1987	West Maegashira #13; 6–9	West Jūryō #2; 9–6	East Maegashira #14; 8–7	East Maegashira #8; 11–4	East Komusubi #1; 4–11	West Maegashira #4; 6–9
1988	West Maegashira #6; 6–9	East Maegashira #10; 7–8	East Maegashira #12; 1–14	West Jūryō #8; 9–6	East Jūryō #4; 5–10	East Jūryō #10; 9–6
1989	East Jūryō #4; 8–7	East Jūryō #2; 6–9	West Jūryō #6; 9–6	West Jūryō #1; 8–7	East Jūryō #1; 7–8	East Jūryō #2; 5–10
1990	East Jūryō #7; 4–11	East Makushita #3; Retired; 0–0–7	x	x	x	x
Record given as wins–losses–absences Top division champion Top division runner-up Retired Lower divisions Non-participation Sanshō key: F=Fighting spirit; O=Outstanding performance; T=Technique Also shown: ★=Kinboshi; P=Playoff(s); Divisions: Makuuchi — Jūryō — Makushita — Sandanme — Jonidan — Jonokuchi Makuuchi ranks: Yokozuna — Ōzeki — Sekiwake — Komusubi — Maegashira

== See also ==
- Glossary of sumo terms
- List of past sumo wrestlers
- List of komusubi
