= Taishi Sunagawa =

Japanese footballer

Personal information
- Full name: Taishi Sunagawa
- Date of birth: January 20, 1990 (age 36)
- Place of birth: Okinawa, Japan
- Height: 1.70 m (5 ft 7 in)
- Position: Defender

Team information
- Current team: Matsue City FC
- Number: 20

Youth career
- 2008–2011: Komazawa University

Senior career*
Years	Team	Apps	(Gls)
2012–2014	FC Ryukyu	23	(0)
2015–	Matsue City FC		
Total		23	(0)
- * Club domestic league appearances and goals

Taishi Sunagawa (砂川 太志, Sunagawa Taishi; born January 20, 1990) is a Japanese football player. He plays for Matsue City FC.

== Playing career ==
Taishi Sunagawa played for FC Ryukyu from 2012 to 2014. In 2015, he moved to Matsue City FC.
