= Kagayaki Taishi =

Japanese sumo wrestler

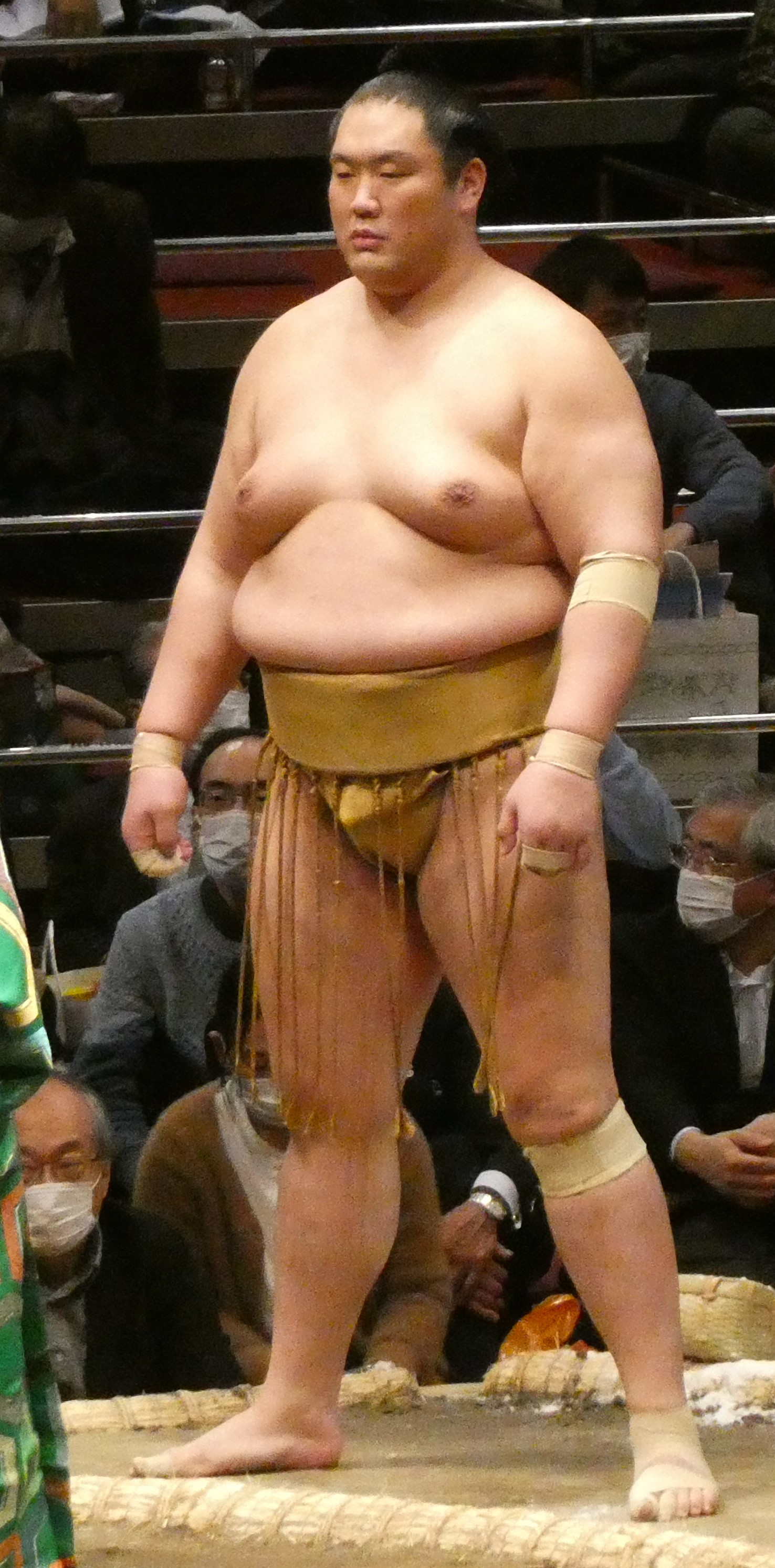
- Kagayaki in 2022

Personal information
- Native name: 輝 大士
- Born: Ryōya Tatsu; 1 June 1994 (age 32) Kanazawa, Ishikawa
- Height: 1.93 m (6 ft 4 in)
- Weight: 154 kg (340 lb; 24.3 st)

Sport
- Sport: Sumo
- Rank: see below
- Heya: Takadagawa stable
- Debut: March 2010
- Highest rank: Maegashira 3 (November, 2020)
- Updated on 26 November 2023

Kagayaki Taishi (Japanese: 輝 大士; born 1 June 1994 as Ryōya Tatsu (達 綾哉, Tatsu Ryōya)) is a Japanese professional sumo wrestler. He wrestles for Takadagawa stable and made his professional debut in May 2010. Kagayaki reached the top division for the first time in 2016. His highest rank is maegashira 3.

== Early life and sumo background ==
Tatsu Ryōya was born in Kanazawa, Ishikawa and is the youngest of three children. His father was a truck driver. Tatsu is a distant relative of former yokozuna Wajima Hiroshi. He was a normal-sized baby but grew quickly so that when attending kindergarten he had difficulty fitting into the uniform. He first began practicing sumo whilst in the first grade of elementary school. By the age of thirteen, when he ended his first year at junior high school he stood 1.83 m (6 ft 0 in), and weighed 108 kg (238 lb). After competing successfully in junior high school sumo he gave up formal education at the age of fifteen and entered the Takadagawa stable to pursue a professional career.

== Career ==
=== Early career ===
In the early part of his sumo career the wrestler subsequently known as Kagayaki competed as "Tatsu", his family name. On entering the professional sport Tatsu revealed that his idol was Hakuhō and that his aim was to become a yokozuna "in six or seven years".

He was still a month away from his sixteenth birthday when he made his professional debut in May 2010 but recorded six wins in the jonokuchi division to earn an immediate promotion. Two months later another 6–1 result saw him being promoted from jonidan to sandanme, the fourth-highest division. After five more tournaments he was promoted to makushita (third division) after a 5–2 result at the Nagoya tournament in July 2011.

On his third tournament in the division, in January 2012, the seventeen-year-old Tatsu tied for the lead with six wins at the end of regular competition but was defeated in the first round of an eight-man play-off for the makushita championship. Tatsu spent the next two years performing consistently in the mid to upper makushita ranks before a run of eight consecutive winning records (kachi-koshi) saw him being promoted to jūryō (second division) for the November 2014 tournament. It was at this point that Tatsu announced that he had adopted the shikona Kagayaki Taishi. The surname comes from the express train service which runs between Tokyo and Kanazawa, his home town, while the given name is a different reading of the characters in Wajima Hiroshi's given name.

Kagayaki made an immediate impact in jūryō, recording 11–4 and 10–5 records in his first two tournaments to reach the brink of another promotion but initially struggled when moved up to the division's higher ranks. A 10–5 record in September however, put him back in contention and an 8–7 in November 2015 (beating Satoyama on the final day) saw him promoted to makuuchi (top division) for the first time.

=== Makuuchi career ===
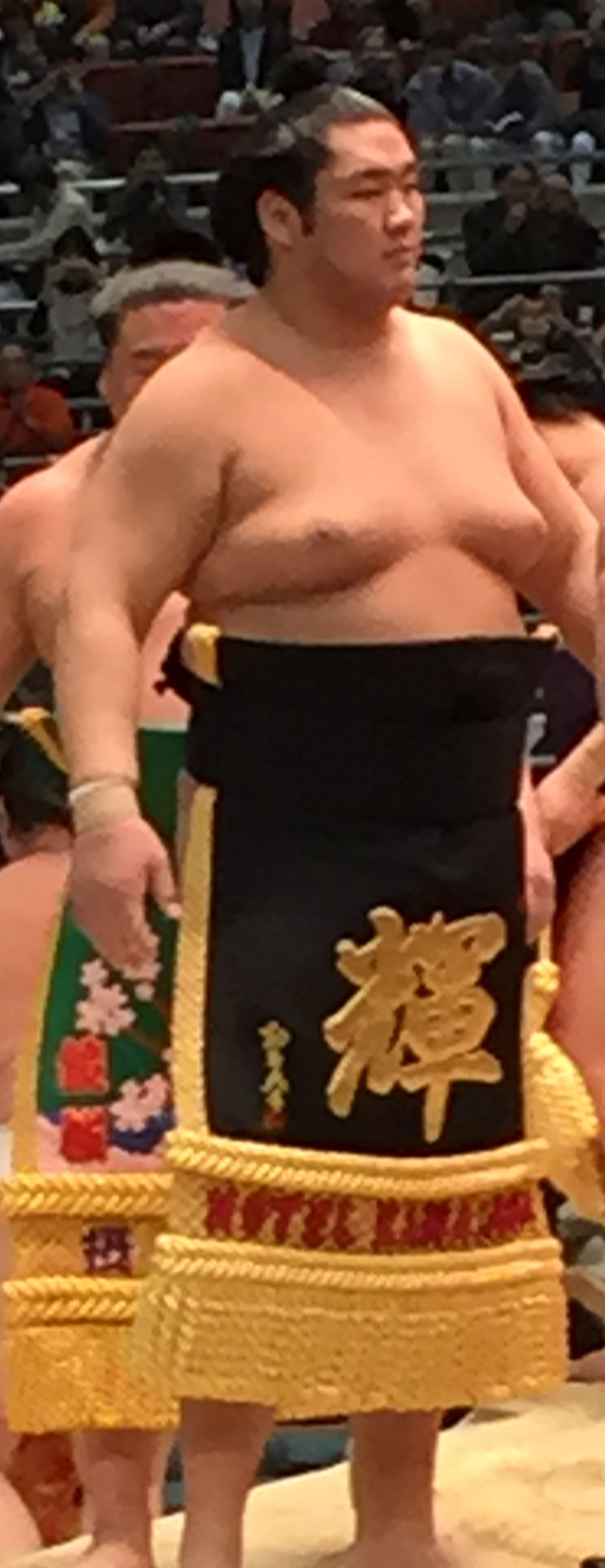
Kagayaki in 2015

Kagayaki struggled in his top division debut: he won only two of his first thirteen matches, one of which was a walk-over when his scheduled opponent, Endō, withdrew with an injury. He won his last two bouts to salvage a 4–11 record but he was relegated back to jūryō. He recorded only seven wins in March but secured a second promotion with a 10–5 result in May. He barely avoided relegation with a 7–8 record in July but recorded his first kachi-koshi (winning record) in the top division with nine wins in September. Ranked at a new high of maegashira 9 he recorded six wins in November and was dropped to maegashira 11 for the January 2017 tournament when he posted an 8–7 record. He returned to maegashira 9 in March and retained his rank for the May tournament despite a 7–8 result. He continued to maintain his place in the top division for the rest of that year, reaching a new career-best rank of maegashira 4 in July.

After reaching as high as maegashira 3 for the November 2020 tournament, Kagayaki posted consecutive losing records, eventually being relegated back to jūryō for the January 2022 basho. However he returned to the top division for the March 2022 tournament. After spending July and September in jūryō, he returned to makuuchi once again for the November 2022 tournament.

== Fighting style ==
Kagayaki is an oshi and tsuki specialist, which means he relies on pushing and thrusting techniques to defeat his opponents rather than belt-wrestling. His most common winning technique is oshidashi (push-out) which accounts for 46% of his wins.

== Personal life ==
Kagayaki's family still lives in Ishikawa Prefecture, and he was part of a delegation of wrestlers from the prefecture (along with Ōnosato, Endō and former Tochinonada) sent on 6 February after the 2024 Noto earthquake; charged with symbolically presenting Governor Hiroshi Hase with the sums raised during the January tournament and donations from the Sumo Association. During the visit, he expressed his relief that his family had been able to leave the evacuation center, despite the lack of water in the neighborhood.

In April 2025 it was announced that Kagayaki was engaged to Tomoe Orito, a Japanese office worker from Ishikawa Prefecture, whom he had been dating for about two years. It was reported that the family of Kagayaki's sister evacuated to Orito's home in Komatsu following the 2024 Noto earthquake. Kagayaki's wedding reception was held in June 2025 with about 400 in attendance, including newly-promoted yokozuna Ōnosato.

== Career record ==
Kagayaki Taishi
Year	January Hatsu basho, Tokyo	March Haru basho, Osaka	May Natsu basho, Tokyo	July Nagoya basho, Nagoya	September Aki basho, Tokyo	November Kyūshū basho, Fukuoka
2010	x	(Maezumō)	West Jonokuchi #11; 6–1	East Jonidan #50; 6–1	East Sandanme #84; 6–1	East Sandanme #25; 4–3
2011	West Sandanme #11; 2–5	East Sandanme #37; Tournament Cancelled; Match fixing investigation 0–0–0	East Sandanme #37; 4–3	East Sandanme #12; 5–2	East Makushita #53; 4–3	East Makushita #46; 4–3
2012	East Makushita #40; 6–1–P	East Makushita #16; 2–5	West Makushita #31; 5–2	West Makushita #19; 5–2	West Makushita #11; 2–5	West Makushita #25; 5–2
2013	East Makushita #16; 3–4	West Makushita #21; 3–4	East Makushita #33; 3–4	East Makushita #44; 4–3	East Makushita #38; 4–3	West Makushita #29; 5–2
2014	East Makushita #19; 4–3	East Makushita #13; 4–3	West Makushita #9; 4–3	East Makushita #7; 5–2	West Makushita #3; 4–3	West Jūryō #14; 10–5
2015	West Jūryō #8; 11–4	East Jūryō #2; 6–9	West Jūryō #4; 8–7	West Jūryō #2; 6–9	East Jūryō #5; 10–5	East Jūryō #2; 8–7
2016	East Maegashira #16; 4–11	West Jūryō #4; 7–8	East Jūryō #5; 10–5	East Maegashira #14; 7–8	West Maegashira #14; 9–6	West Maegashira #9; 6–9
2017	East Maegashira #11; 8–7	East Maegashira #9; 7–8	West Maegashira #9; 9–6	West Maegashira #4; 5–10	West Maegashira #6; 4–11	West Maegashira #12; 7–8
2018	West Maegashira #12; 9–6	East Maegashira #8; 7–8	West Maegashira #8; 9–6	West Maegashira #4; 6–9	East Maegashira #6; 7–8	West Maegashira #6; 5–10
2019	East Maegashira #12; 6–9	West Maegashira #13; 9–6	East Maegashira #10; 5–10	West Maegashira #12; 7–8	East Maegashira #13; 6–9	West Maegashira #13; 10–5
2020	West Maegashira #11; 10–5	West Maegashira #6; 8–7	East Maegashira #4; Tournament Cancelled; State of Emergency; 0–0–0	East Maegashira #4; 5–10	West Maegashira #6; 8–7	East Maegashira #3; 5–10
2021	West Maegashira #6; 6–9	West Maegashira #7; 6–9	West Maegashira #9; 6–9	West Maegashira #12; 7–8	East Maegashira #13; 7–8	East Maegashira #14; 5–10
2022	East Jūryō #1; 8–7	East Maegashira #17; 7–8	West Maegashira #17; 6–9	East Jūryō #3; 7–8	East Jūryō #4; 9–6	East Maegashira #15; 9–6
2023	East Maegashira #12; 7–8	East Maegashira #12; 5–10	East Maegashira #17; 7–8	East Jūryō #1; 9–6	East Maegashira #16; 5–10	East Jūryō #3; 5–10
2024	East Jūryō #7; 9–6	East Jūryō #4; 7–8	East Jūryō #5; 11–4	East Maegashira #16; 9–6	West Maegashira #11; 3–12	East Jūryō #2; 9–6
2025	West Maegashira #16; 6–9	West Jūryō #1; 4–11	West Jūryō #4; 6–9	East Jūryō #7; 9–6	East Jūryō #4; 8–7	East Jūryō #4; 9–6
2026	West Jūryō #2; 6–9	East Jūryō #5; 7–8	East Jūryō #7; 5–10	East Jūryō #11; 7–8	East Jūryō #11; 11–4–PP	East Jūryō #3; 7–8
Record given as wins–losses–absences Top division champion Top division runner-up Retired Non-participation Jūryō Lower divisions Sanshō key: F=Fighting spirit; O=Outstanding performance; T=Technique Also shown: ★=Kinboshi; P=Playoff(s); Divisions: Makuuchi — Jūryō — Makushita — Sandanme — Jonidan — Jonokuchi Makuuchi ranks: Yokozuna — Ōzeki — Sekiwake — Komusubi — Maegashira

== See also ==
- Glossary of sumo terms
- List of active sumo wrestlers
