= Kitaharima Seiya =

Japanese professional sumo wrestler (born 1986)

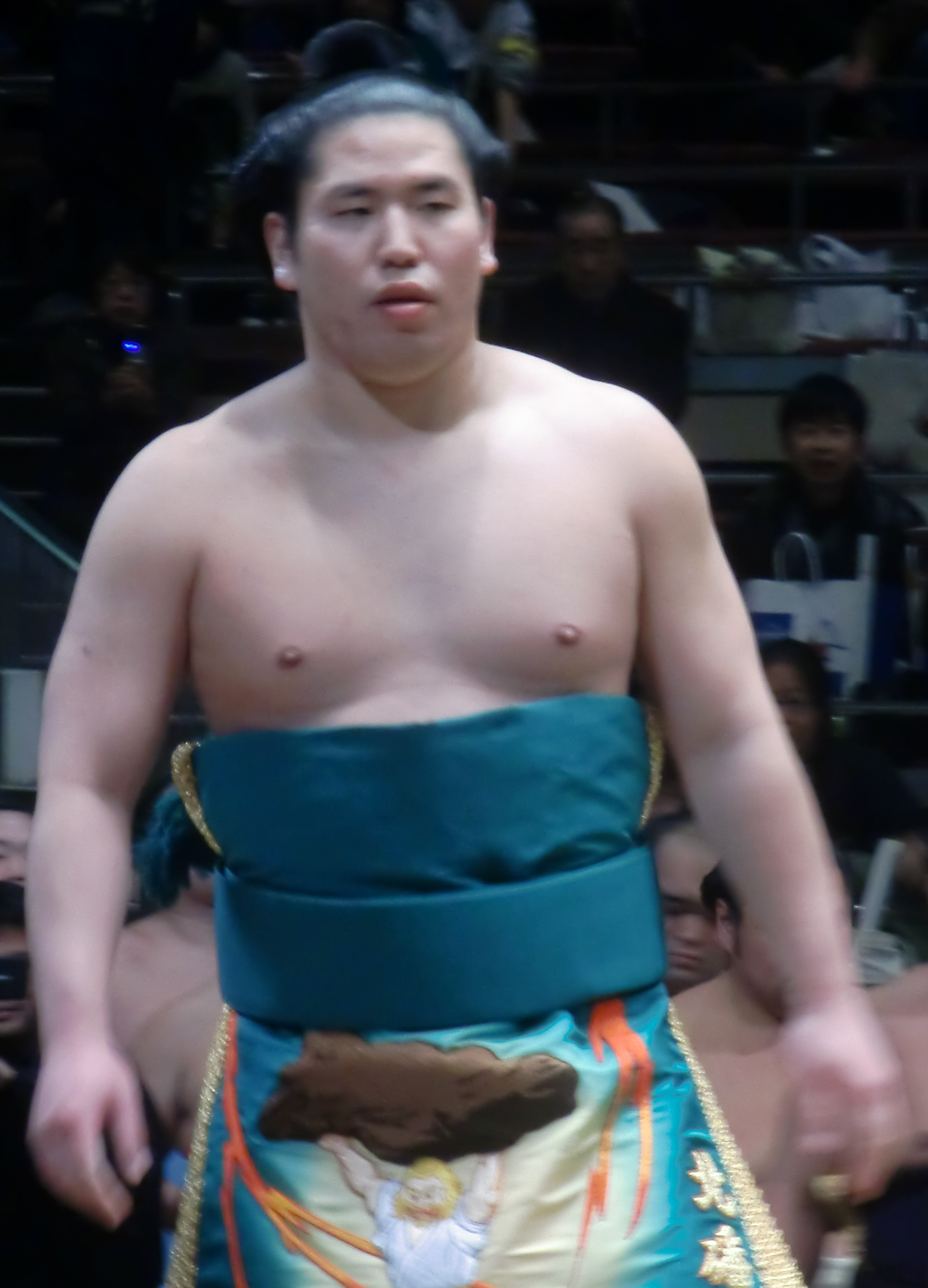

Personal information
- Native name: 北磻磨 聖也
- Born: Seiya Shimada; 28 July 1986 (age 40) Tatsuno, Hyōgo, Japan
- Height: 1.82 m (5 ft 11 1/2 in)
- Weight: 126 kg (278 lb)

Sport
- Sport: Sumo
- Rank: See below
- Heya: Yamahibiki
- Debut: March 2002
- Highest rank: Maegashira 15 (July 2016)
- Championships: 1 (Sandanme)
- Updated on 31 January 2024

Kitaharima Seiya (Japanese: 北磻磨 聖也; born 28 July 1986 as Shimada Seiya (嶋田聖也, Seiya Shimada)) is a Japanese professional sumo wrestler. He made his professional debut in March 2002. His highest rank has been maegashira 15. He wrestles for Yamahibiki stable.

== Career ==
He was born in Tatsuno, Hyōgo, where there is a shrine to the legendary founder of sumo, Nomi no Sukune. He is a member of the generation born between April 1986 and April 1987 (Showa 61) known as the "Flower of 61" that also includes Yokozuna Kisenosato, Ōzeki Gōeidō and Sekiwake Myōgiryū. He did judo when he first joined school, but from the fourth year of elementary school he switched to sumo, and participated in national sumo competitions at elementary and junior high school. He had aspirations to go to high school, but was persuaded to join Kitanoumi stable, run by the former yokozuna Kitanoumi, upon graduation from junior high.

He made his professional debut in March 2002, alongside future top division wrestlers such as Kisenosato and Katayama, and also his own stablemate Nionoumi. He reached the third highest makushita division in July 2005, but weighing barely more than 100 kilograms (220 lb) he found it hard to make further progress. He had begun wrestling using his own surname of Shimada, but adopted his present shikona in March 2008, formed from combination of his original stable name (Kitanoumi) and an old name for west Hyōgo Prefecture (Harima Province). He finally reached the jūryō division for the first time in January 2012 nearly a decade after his debut. He was the first sekitori from Tatsuno since Banryūyama who had been a stablemate of Kitanoumi and was then a coach at the affiliated Mihogaseki stable. He spent all of 2012 in jūryō but had only two winning records in that time and was demoted back to the makushita division in January 2013. After moving between jūryō and makushita a number of times he re-established himself in jūryō from the September 2014 tournament. In November 2015 after the death of his stablemaster Kitanoumi, who was also the chairman of the Japan Sumo Association, the former maegashira Ganyū took over the running of the stable, which was renamed Yamahibiki stable.

Following a record of nine wins against six losses at the rank of Jūryō 4 in May 2016, Kitaharima made his top makuuchi division debut in the July 2016 tournament, the only wrestler in that tournament who was new to the top division. It had taken him 85 tournaments from his professional debut to reach the top division, which is the ninth slowest in sumo history. His promotion came 14 years after leaving junior high school. He told reporters that having been in sumo since he was 15, he was disappointed that his contemporaries who had instead gone to high school and university before entering the professional ranks had overtaken him. At 126 kilograms (278 lb) he was lightest man in the top division and some 30 kilograms (66 lb) lighter than the average for the division. Kitaharima's stablemaster stressed the importance of his predecessor Kitanoumi to Kitaharima's success, saying that Kitanoumi always called Kitaharima by his given name "Seiya," because "my disciples are the same as my own children."

Kitaharima won his first bout in the top division, defeating Nishikigi. However he finished the tournament with a losing record of six wins against nine losses and was demoted back to jūryō after just one tournament. Restricted by neck pain, he had two poor performances of 5–10 and 4–11 in the following two tournaments and fell back to makushita in January 2017. After his neck problem cleared up he returned to jūryō after a 5–2 record, but lasted only one tournament. After two consecutive winning records in makushita in May and July 2017 he returned to jūryō again in September 2017. Both he and Kizenryū were being promoted to jūryō for the seventh time in this tournament, the second highest ever at the time. However he lost seven of his first eight bouts, and with a 5–10 record at the end of the tournament was once again demoted. He remained in makushita for the next three years before finally getting his eighth promotion to jūryō after the July 2020 tournament at the age of 34. He secured this result by defeating Takagenji on the final day for a 5–2 record at Makushita 3. He had been out of jūryō for 17 tournaments. In the September 2020 tournament Kitaharima could manage only five wins against ten losses, losing his last four bouts. He narrowly failed to return to jūryō in November and was ranked at Makushita 1 East in January 2021. He was forced to sit out the March 2021 tournament after a coach at his stable tested positive for COVID-19, but his ranking was protected. In January 2022 he had his poorest record for over a decade, a 1–6 at makushita 15, which sent him down to makushita 40 for March 2022. In May 2022, Kitaharima failed to win the makushita championship when he lost to Ōshōma on the last day.

Relegated to the sandanme division for the first time since 2008 at the September 2023 tournament, Kitaharima nonetheless won all his matches and claimed the division's championship. In doing so, he became, at the age of 37, the oldest wrestler ranked in the makushita division or below to win a tournament since Ōiwato who won the makushita tournament in 2005 at the age of 36. After his championship win, Kitaharima spent two tournaments in the makushita division before it was announced in January 2024 that he was promoted to the jūryō division for the ninth time in his career, hence being tied for the most promotion to the jūryō division along former Kizenryū (repromoted for the ninth time in July 2018). This latest repromotion, at the age of 37 years, 6 months and 29 days, makes Kitaharima the second oldest wrestler to be repromoted to sekitori status in modern sumo history, behind Ōshio (repromoted in May 1987 at the age of 39). On the occasion of this new promotion Kitaharima shared that his inspiration for remaining an active wrestler was his former stablemate Kitazakura, who, as the third-oldest repromoted to jūryō in modern sumo, continued his career even after his demotion to the makushita division. However, Kitaharima suffered an eighth defeat (make-koshi) in his match against Chiyoshōma on Day 11, making it uncertain whether he will remain in jūryō. In the end, he won just 4 victories in the tournament, leaving little chance of staying in the sekitori ranks. However, he declared himself pleased with the public support he received, declaring "It was an experience that gave me goose bumps every day."

== Fighting style ==
Kitaharima is a tsuki/oshi specialist, who prefers pushing and thrusting at his opponents rather than fighting on the mawashi or belt. His most common winning kimarite or technique is oshi dashi or a straightforward push out.

He is known for wanting to practice day or night, which led to his stablemaster warning against him over-training. Kitaharima has said he has no real hobbies and on his makuuchi promotion remarked that he was thinking only about sumo. At the age of 37, he confided on the occasion of his ninth repromotion in the jūryō division that he still hadn't changed his training habits, although he also admitted to having to rely more on alternative treatments such as massages or changing his diet on the advice of Takayasu.

== Family ==
His younger brother Tetsuya Shimada was also a wrestler at the same stable. He reached a highest rank of sandanme 78 and was known as Tatsunoumi. He retired after the September 2022 tournament.

== Career record ==
Kitaharima Seiya
Year	January Hatsu basho, Tokyo	March Haru basho, Osaka	May Natsu basho, Tokyo	July Nagoya basho, Nagoya	September Aki basho, Tokyo	November Kyūshū basho, Fukuoka
2002	x	(Maezumō)	East Jonokuchi #29; 4–3	East Jonidan #111; 4–3	East Jonidan #86; 4–3	East Jonidan #60; 4–3
2003	West Jonidan #37; 1–6	West Jonidan #72; 5–2	East Jonidan #28; 3–4	West Jonidan #48; 4–3	East Jonidan #28; 5–2	West Sandanme #90; 2–5
2004	West Jonidan #14; 4–3	East Sandanme #95; 4–3	West Sandanme #76; 4–3	East Sandanme #58; 3–4	West Sandanme #77; 5–2	West Sandanme #43; 4–3
2005	West Sandanme #26; 4–3	East Sandanme #14; 4–3	West Sandanme #3; 4–3	West Makushita #54; 2–5	West Sandanme #15; 2–5	East Sandanme #37; 5–2
2006	East Sandanme #10; 4–3	East Makushita #59; 4–3	East Makushita #49; 3–4	East Sandanme #1; 5–2	West Makushita #43; 4–3	East Makushita #35; 5–2
2007	West Makushita #21; 2–5	West Makushita #39; 3–4	East Makushita #51; 1–6	East Sandanme #22; 5–2	East Makushita #58; 3–4	West Sandanme #14; 3–4
2008	East Sandanme #24; 6–1	East Makushita #46; 4–3	East Makushita #38; 3–4	West Makushita #49; 5–2	West Makushita #34; 3–4	West Makushita #43; 5–2
2009	East Makushita #28; 4–3	West Makushita #20; 1–6	East Makushita #40; 2–5	West Makushita #60; 4–3	East Makushita #49; 4–3	East Makushita #42; 6–1
2010	East Makushita #18; 3–4	West Makushita #24; 4–3	West Makushita #19; 5–2	East Makushita #13; 3–4	West Makushita #16; 5–2	West Makushita #7; 5–2
2011	East Makushita #2; 3–4	West Makushita #6; Tournament Cancelled; Match fixing investigation 0–0–0	West Makushita #6; 2–5	East Makushita #9; 4–3	East Makushita #4; 4–3	East Makushita #2; 4–3
2012	West Jūryō #13; 8–7	West Jūryō #10; 5–10	West Jūryō #14; 9–6	East Jūryō #8; 7–8	West Jūryō #8; 7–8	East Jūryō #10; 4–11
2013	West Makushita #2; 4–3	East Makushita #1; 5–2	East Jūryō #12; 6–9	West Makushita #3; 4–3	West Jūryō #14; 7–8	East Makushita #1; 3–4
2014	West Makushita #4; 5–2	West Jūryō #14; 7–8	East Makushita #1; 3–4	East Makushita #4; 5–2	West Jūryō #12; 8–7	East Jūryō #9; 9–6
2015	West Jūryō #5; 6–9	West Jūryō #8; 7–8	West Jūryō #9; 9–6	East Jūryō #6; 9–6	East Jūryō #2; 7–8	East Jūryō #4; 8–7
2016	West Jūryō #3; 5–10	East Jūryō #8; 9–6	East Jūryō #4; 9–6	East Maegashira #15; 6–9	West Jūryō #2; 5–10	East Jūryō #9; 4–11
2017	East Makushita #1; 5–2	West Jūryō #11; 4–11	East Makushita #3; 4–3	East Makushita #2; 6–1	East Jūryō #12; 5–10	East Makushita #2; 3–4
2018	East Makushita #4; 3–4	West Makushita #7; 4–3	West Makushita #4; 3–4	West Makushita #8; 2–5	West Makushita #20; 3–4	West Makushita #30; 4–3
2019	East Makushita #25; 3–4	West Makushita #30; 5–2	West Makushita #17; 3–4	West Makushita #23; 3–4	East Makushita #28; 5–2	East Makushita #16; 4–3
2020	West Makushita #12; 3–4	East Makushita #19; 6–1	West Makushita #3; Tournament Cancelled; State of Emergency; 0–0–0	West Makushita #3; 5–2	West Jūryō #14; 5–10	East Makushita #3; 4–3
2021	East Makushita #1; 3–4	West Makushita #5; Sat out due to COVID rules 0–0–7	West Makushita #5; 3–4	East Makushita #9; 2–5	West Makushita #20; 5–2	East Makushita #9; 3–4
2022	West Makushita #15; 1–6	East Makushita #40; 4–3	East Makushita #30; 6–1	West Makushita #11; 3–4	West Makushita #19; 3–4	East Makushita #25; 2–5
2023	East Makushita #45; 4–3	East Makushita #34; 4–3	East Makushita #28; 2–5	West Makushita #49; 3–4	West Sandanme #2; 7–0; Champion	East Makushita #11; 6–1
2024	West Makushita #2; 4–3	East Jūryō #14; 4–11	East Makushita #4; 4–3	West Makushita #2; 1–6	West Makushita #20; 1–6	West Makushita #42; 5–2
2025	West Makushita #24; 5–2	East Makushita #11; 3–4	East Makushita #17; 3–4	West Makushita #24; 4–3	East Makushita #18; 2–5	East Makushita #32; 2–5
2026	East Makushita #52; 5–2	West Makushita #31; 3–4	West Makushita #40; 1–6	East Sandanme #9; 5–2	West Makushita #46; 4–3	West Makushita #39; 3–4
Record given as wins–losses–absences Top division champion Top division runner-up Retired Non-participation Jūryō Lower divisions Sanshō key: F=Fighting spirit; O=Outstanding performance; T=Technique Also shown: ★=Kinboshi; P=Playoff(s); Divisions: Makuuchi — Jūryō — Makushita — Sandanme — Jonidan — Jonokuchi Makuuchi ranks: Yokozuna — Ōzeki — Sekiwake — Komusubi — Maegashira

== See also ==
- Glossary of sumo terms
- List of active sumo wrestlers
- List of sumo record holders
