= Saitama Sakae High School =

Private high school in Tottori, Japan

Saitama Sakae High School 埼玉栄高等学校
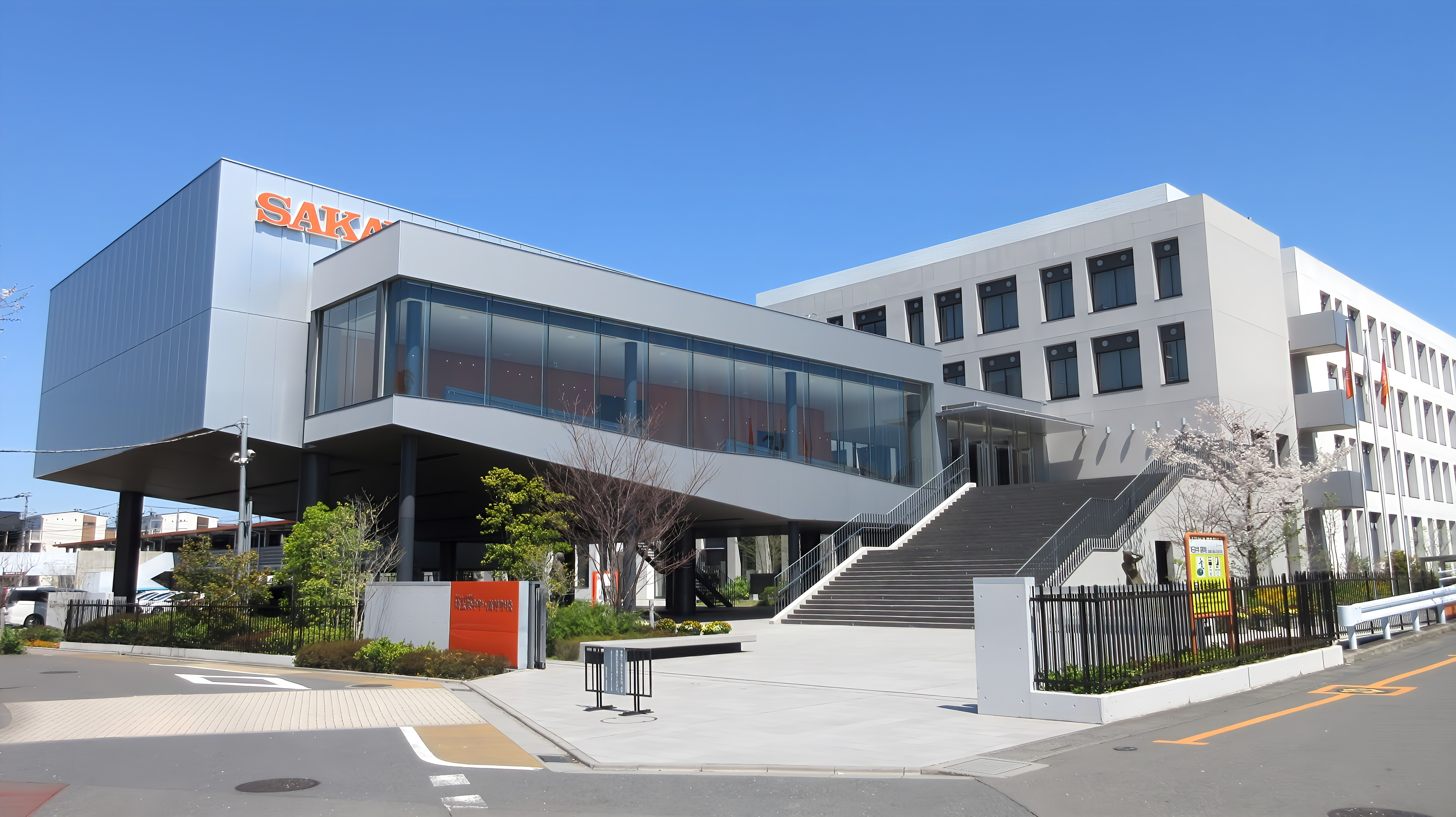
- Saitama Sakae in 2024

Location
- 3-chome 11−1 Nishiomiya; Saitama Prefecture; Saitama, Japan; 35.9261°N 139.5775°E

Information
- School type: Private, Coeducational
- Motto: 今日学べ (learning today)
- Established: 1972
- Founder: Eitarō Satō
- School number: 048-624-6488
- Principal: Gen Machida (since 2017)
- Enrollment: approx. 3000 students
- Colors: dark orange and white
- Song: Sakae no Youth (さかえの青春)
- Mascot: beaver
- Website: In Japanese https://www.saitamasakae-h.ed.jp/senior/

Saitama Sakae High School, also commonly known as Sakae High, is a private junior and senior high school located in Saitama City, Saitama Prefecture.

The school is known for its sports activities and its wide range of studies. Among the sports in which the school excels, the men's sumo club and the women's baseball club are recognized as some of the best in the country. The badminton club is also well known.

== History ==
The school was established as a senior high school on February 2, 1972, by Gakkō Hōjin Satoe Gakuen, a Japanese school corporation founded by Eitarō Satō in 1971. The educational departments at that time were strongly oriented toward mechanical and sports learning, and the first to be established were those of automobile mechanics and health and physical education. In 1973, the school received approval to establish regular courses. In 1985, the International Information Technology Department was established. In 1986, Chairman and Principal Eitarō Satō received awards from the Minister of Education and the Minister of Transport. He also received the medal of honor with blue ribbon. In 1990, a women's dormitory was opened, and another dormitory was constructed in 2006. In 1993, the gymnasium was completed (with a kendo area and a judo hall). In 2000, a third gym was opened, and the school became an integrated junior and senior high school with the opening of Saitama Sakae Junior High School. In 2008, Eitarō Satō retired and his son Takashi Satō was appointed chairman of Gakkō Hōjin Satoe Gakuen and principal of the school. In 2011, Hiroaki Suzuki took over from Takashi Satō, who was hospitalized due to recurring hypertension problems. Between 2011 and 2017, two more headmasters were appointed (Koichi Satō and Gen Machida). In 2016, the entire school was renovated and a new main building was inaugurated.

Over the past 5 years, the school, especially the junior high school, has seen a surge in applications from other prefectures such as Tokyo and Kanagawa.

The school's emblem, Mitsu-ga-ishi (三柏), lit. 'three oak leaves', was inspired by the Mon of the school's founder. It is common for schools under the Gakkō Hōjin Satoe Gakuen to display this emblem, adding their school's initials to distinguish them from each other.

== Features and characteristics ==
=== Courses ===
Saitama Sakae Senior High School has two main courses: the general course divided into four specialized courses (α course, S course, special course, art class), and the Health and Physical Education course.

==== General course ====
This course is designed to prepare students for entrance exams to prestigious national and public universities such as Tokyo Institute of Technology, the University of Tsukuba and Saitama University, as well as challenging private universities such as Waseda University and Keio University.
This course is itself divided into four sub-courses:

- α course, a course specializing in preparation for medical university entrance examinations
- S course, to prepare for non-medical entrance examinations
- special course, to prepare for university entrance exams via a system of balance between study and extracurricular activities
- art class, a specialized course accessible only from the second year onwards and designed to prepare students for entry into art and music colleges

==== Health and Physical Education course ====
A specialized course alternating theoretical studies with an emphasis on sports practice, with the aim of creating top-level athletes. In this particular course, Saitama Sakae High School graduated have gone on to success in sports such as sumo, badminton, baseball and track and field.

== Clubs ==
=== Sports ===
Tottori Jōhoku High School has athletic facilities including an artificial turf field, tartan course, baseball field, training room, and arena gymnasium. The school offers its students sports activities including:

- Athletics
- Ekiden
- Baseball
- Volleyball
- Basketball
- Gymnastics
- Rhythmic Gymnastics
- Kendo
- Judo
- Amateur Wrestling
- Weightlifting
- Association football
- Softball
- Swimming
- Water polo
- American football
- Handball
- Table tennis
- Tennis
- Archery
- Karate
- Golf
- Baton
- Iaido
- Fencing
- Cheering
- Naginata
- Ice Hockey
- Skating
- Dance
- Cheerleading

==== Sumo ====
The school is regularly referred to as a "sumo power house", with more than a dozen wrestlers graduating from the school having reached the status of sekitori. Every year, several students from the Saitama Sakae sumo club decide to become professionals, and the school regularly produces around five professional wrestlers a year. The school usually gives one keshō-mawashi (ceremonial apron) to each student who becomes a sekitori. Since Gōeidō, 26 alumni have received an apron. Between 2019 and 2022, the school raised six different high-school yokozuna. In July 2022, 14 out of the 70 sekitori in professional sumo were alumni from Saitama Sakae sumo club, and in July of the following year, 11 of the 42 makuuchi (sumo's top division) wrestlers were from the high school. The club's current director, Michinori Yamada, is a graduate of Nihon University and amateur yokozuna. He has managed the club since 1988.

==== Baseball ====
Saitama Sakae High School is considered a pioneer in girls' high school baseball and was the second high school in Japan to establish a girls' baseball team in 1997. The girls' baseball team notably won the national championship, both in the invitational tournament in spring and summer championship, 12 times. The men's baseball team is regularly ranked among the top 8 teams in Japan.

==== Running ====
In November 2022, the running team set records of 13:59 at a competition in Yokohama City and at the national 5,000 metres tournament. It was the first time in 13 years that a runner from the same high school had clocked 13:54 (a prefectural high school record) since 2009.

==== Badminton ====
As of 2023, the men's badminton club is ranked among the top 5 Japanese clubs. The club notably won the All-Japan Junior High School Championships in March 2022 and the National High School Spring Championships in March 2023.

=== Cultural activities ===
- Wind band
- Tea ceremony
- Calligraphy
- Art
- Marching band
- Chorus
- Broadcasting
- Mandolin
- Guitar
- Koto music
- Photography
- Science
- Advancement
- Home economics
- Go

== Alumni ==
=== Sumo ===
- Gōeidō Gōtarō
- Takakeishō Takanobu
- Myōgiryū Yasunari
- Daieishō Hayato
- Tochiōzan Yūichirō
- Kotozakura Masakatsu II
- Tobizaru Masaya
- Hōmashō Noriyuki
- Hokutofuji Daiki
- Kotoshōhō Yoshinari
- Tochisakae Atsushi
- Ōhō Kōnosuke
- Hidenoumi Takuya
- Yago Takanori
- Gōnoyama Tōki
- Bushōzan Kotarō

=== Track and field ===
- Kengo Yamazaki
- Kazue Kakinuma
- Anna Doi
- Momoko Takahashi

=== Badminton ===
- Ayato Endo
- Riku Hatano
- Yuki Kaneko
- Haruki Kawabe
- Akira Koga
- Shuntaro Mezaki
- Hiroki Midorikawa
- Rei Miyashita
- Kenta Nishimoto
- Takuma Obayashi
- Hiroki Okamura
- Yudai Okimoto
- Masayuki Onodera
- Yusuke Onodera
- Kaho Osawa
- Natsu Saito
- Hinata Suzuki
- Kenichi Tago
- Hyuga Takano
- Yuta Takei
- Yoshinori Takeuchi
- Koki Watanabe

=== Baseball ===
- Yukari Isozaki
- Nami Okumura
- Tomomi Nakada

=== Other ===
- Takehiko Orimo (basketball)
- Masato Kobayashi (welterweight kickboxing)
- Shun Sato (figure skating)
- Yasuyo Yamagishi (football)
- Daiya Seto (swimming)
- Ryōhei Katō (artistic gymnastics)
- Hiromi Miyake (weightlifting)

== Related matters ==
=== Students commendation ===
In 2022, two 17-year-old members of the sumo club found a child who had been missing all morning. After comforting him with food to calm his hunger, the child was taken home. For their actions, the students received a certificate of commendation from Omiya Nishi Police Station.

=== Knife attack ===
In March 2023, a student attacked a 60-year-old teacher at the school with a knife. Although the teacher was lightly injured, the assailant later revealed that he had attacked at random before being contained by other teachers who had come to the aid of the first.

=== Great East Japan Earthquake controversy ===
In March 2023, the members of the association football team had to publish an official apology video after some of their members had ironically commented on the fate of the victims of the Great East Japan Earthquake in a video that became viral.
