= Hidenoumi Takuya =

Japanese sumo wrestler

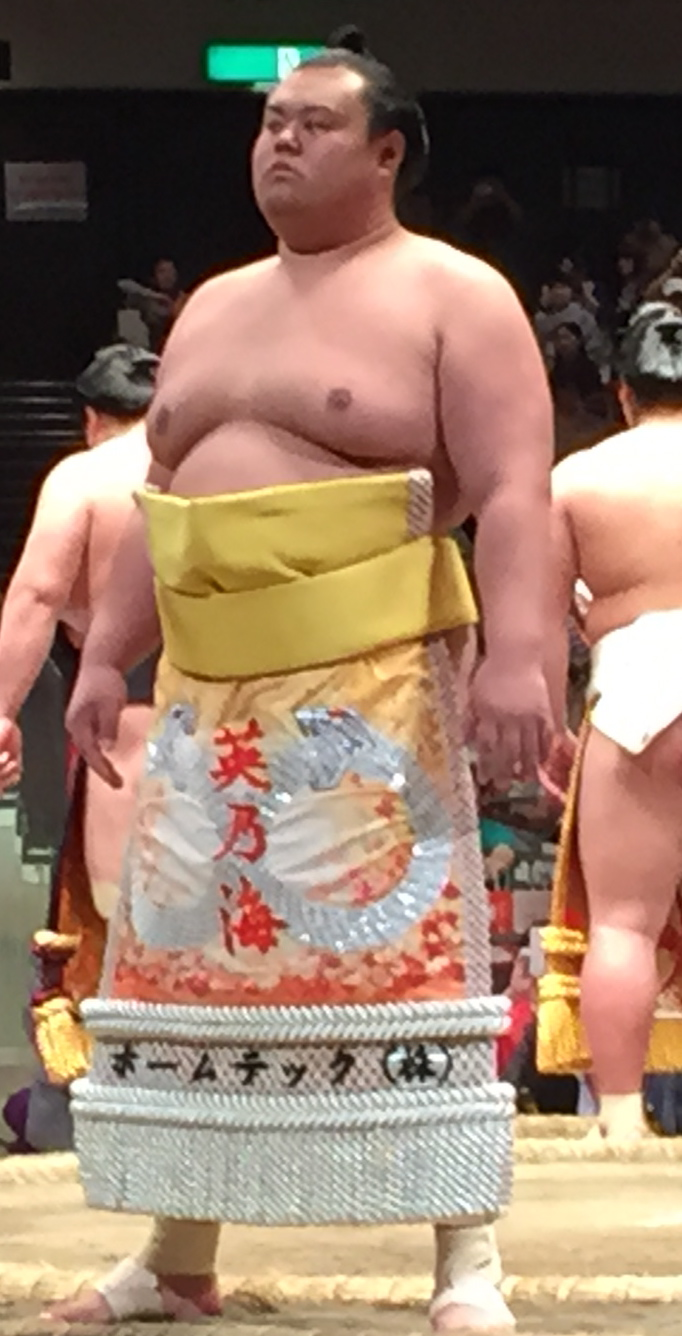
- Hidenoumi in 2015

Personal information
- Native name: 英乃海 拓也
- Born: Takuya Iwasaki; 11 June 1989 (age 37) Edogawa, Tokyo
- Height: 1.86 m (6 ft 1 in)
- Weight: 154.7 kg (341 lb; 24.36 st)

Sport
- Sport: Sumo
- Rank: see below
- University team: Nihon University
- Retired: March 2026
- Heya: Kise
- Debut: May 2012
- Highest rank: Maegashira 6 (May 2021)
- Championships: 1 Jūryō; 1 Jonidan; 1 Jonokuchi
- Updated on March 23, 2026

Hidenoumi Takuya (Japanese: 英乃海 拓也; born 11 June 1989 as Iwasaki Takuya (岩崎 拓也)) is a former Japanese professional sumo wrestler for Kise stable. A former amateur sumo competitor at Nihon University, he made his professional debut in 2012 and was promoted to the top makuuchi division in July 2015. His highest rank to date is maegashira 6. He has one jūryō division yūshō or championship. He is the elder brother of Oitekaze stable wrestler Tobizaru. He retired following the March 2026 tournament.

== Early life and sumo background ==
Takuya Iwasaki was born on 11 June 1989 in Edogawa, Tokyo, the older of two brothers. He first started sumo in primary school from the age of 10 and was soon a regular on the team. He went on to join his junior high school's sumo team, also as a regular. The dojo where he practiced was also used by Chiyotairyū, one year his senior, and had also been used by Daidō, seven years his senior. In high school, his interest and success in sumo continued. He transferred to Saitama Sakae High School, which was known for its strong sumo program. As a member of the sumo club there, he had a string of victories as an anchor member of his sumo team in a number of high school tournaments. In his second year he took the championship at a high school tournament in Kanazawa. Upon graduation, he was scouted by stables, but chose to enter Nihon University, where he joined its well-known sumo program. He was in the same year as the future Daikihō and one year behind the later Jōkōryū. He was not as successful or motivated in university and was not able to take a championship in his four years there. Upon graduation, he was scouted by the head of Kise stable, the former Higonoumi, who was also from his alma mater, Nihon University. Not having achieved the requisite two championships in university, he was obligated to start pro sumo from the bottom of the ranks.

== Career ==
He began his career under his surname Iwasaki. He made his debut in the jonokuchi division at Nagoya in July 2012 and won all seven of his contests to win the division and ensure immediate promotion to jonidan. He faced fellow 7–0 stablemate Hamaguchi in a playoff for the championship; the only situation in which stablemates are allowed to face one another. In September he recorded another perfect record in the jonidan division. Notably, he again faced stablemate Hamaguchi in a playoff, which he again won. This was the first time in sumo history that two stablemates had faced each other in a championship playoff in two consecutive tournaments. In November at Fukuoka he secured a third consecutive promotion when he recorded a 6–1 record in the sandanme division. For the next eleven tournaments, Iwasaki competed in the makushita recording more wins than losses (kachi-koshi) on all but two occasions.

For the Fukuoka tournament in November 2014 he was promoted to the jūryō division and adopted the ring name (shikona) Hidenoumi. In his first appearance in the division he recorded seven wins and five losses, but missed three bouts through injury. After recording winning records in the next three tournaments he was promoted to the top makuuchi division for the Nagoya tournament in July 2015. On his debut in the top division Hidenoumi won only three of his first ten bouts but won three of his last five matches to end with a record of 6–9. An identical record in September saw him return to the jūryō ranks for the November tournament where he posted an 8–7 record. In January 2016 he recorded 11 wins to take the second-division championship and returned to the top division. In March, at a career high ranking of maegashira 12, he reached a score of 6–6 after 12 days, but defeats to Ichinojō and Shōdai saw him end the tournament with a losing record despite victory over Takayasu on the final day. In May he struggled for form, recorded only five wins and was relegated to the second division where he recorded seven wins in July. Wrestling at jūryō 4 in September he recorded nine wins and secured his third promotion to the top division. He was able to win only four bouts in the November 2016 tournament and was knocked unconscious by a blow to the head at the tachi-ai from Kotoyuki on Day 14, causing him to pull out on the final day. He spent all of 2017 in the jūryō division. He took part in a playoff for the jūryō division championship in January 2018 but was defeated by Myōgiryū. However, his 10–5 record was enough to earn him promotion back to makuuchi for the March 2018 tournament. His return was short-lived as a 3–12 record sent him immediately back to jūryō.

In March 2021 Hidenoumi won promotion back to makuuchi after 17 tournaments and joined his brother Tobizaru there. This marked the ninth time there were brothers ranked in the top division simultaneously, and the first since Chiyomaru and Chiyoōtori in March 2014. He produced his first winning record in the top division at the seventh attempt, a 10–5, which saw him promoted to his highest rank to date of maegashira 6 for the May 2021 tournament. He remained in the maegashira ranks for the rest of 2021.

=== Illegal gambling probe ===
On 22 December 2021, Hidenoumi and his stablemate Shiden were withdrawn by their stablemaster Kise Oyakata (former maegashira Higonoumi) from the January 2022 tournament for suspected involvement in illegal gambling. Both were interviewed by the Saitama Prefectural Police on 7 January 2022. According to investigators, the illegal gambling operation ran out of a store in Sōka. Employees and customers of the establishment were arrested on suspicion of illegal gambling when it was raided in September 2021. During the investigation suspicions were raised about the involvement of both Hidenoumi and Shiden, as well as other sumo wrestlers that may have possibly visited the establishment. It was later reported that prosecutors would likely not file charges against the two wrestlers.

On 15 January 2022, Japanese media outlets reported that the Sumo Association's compliance committee, after holding hearings, concluded that Hidenoumi and Shiden participated in illegal gambling. The committee found that Hidenoumi and Shiden visited the establishment on two occasions in July and August of 2021 during the time that the Sumo Association had relaxed COVID-related restrictions on going out. They both played an illegal slot machine, with a stake of less than 100,000 yen. The findings were reported to chairman Hakkaku on 13 January, and the full board of directors was expected to take up the matter during their regular meeting on 27 January. The committee's report recommended a suspension of one tournament for Hidenoumi and no suspension for Shiden. On 27 January, the Sumo Association accepted the committee's recommendation, suspending Hidenoumi for one tournament and also cutting his salary by 20% for two months. The suspension was retroactive to the January 2022 tournament, meaning that Hidenoumi could compete in the March basho in Osaka. Shiden was not issued any formal suspension, but his kyūjō from the January basho resulted in his demotion from sekitori status and a loss of salary. Stablemaster Kise was handed a warning.

On 25 February 2022, the Saitama Prefecture Public Prosecutor's Office announced that it would not prosecute Hidenoumi or Shiden. Three days later, Hidenoumi was ranked back in the jūryō division on the March 2022 banzuke. He remained in jūryō until September 2023, when he was demoted out of sekitori status for the first time in nine years. After winning five of his seven bouts in makushita, the Sumo Association announced that he would return to jūryō for the November 2023 tournament.

=== Retirement ===
Hidenoumi eventually returned to the top division for the July 2025 tournament, but withdrew after going winless in his first four matches. His stablemaster Kise told reporters that Hidenoumi injured his right calf in his Day 4 contest against Kotoeihō, and that he was expected to re-enter the tournament once the pain went away. He lost to Kusano in his return match on Day 8.

Hidenoumi then recorded three consecutive make-koshi in the jūryō division, with ten losses from the bottom of the division in January seeing him relegated to makushita for the first time since September 2023. Hidenoumi finished the March 2026 tournament with a 3-4 record, losing on the final day to Fujitensei. He announced his retirement following the conclusion of the tournament.

In July 2026, Hidenoumi signed a non-exclusive representation agreement with the sumo entertainment agency Sumo Man.

Hidenoumi's retirement ceremony was held at the Ryōgoku Kokugikan on October, 3. His last match was against his brother, Tobizaru, and about 270 people took turns cutting his hair.

== Family ==
Hidenoumi's younger brother Masaya is also a sumo wrestler who wrestles for Oitekaze stable under the shikona of Tobizaru. Tobizaru was promoted to jūryō in July 2017 and makuuchi in September 2020; they became the 18th pair of sekitori brothers in sumo history. Despite the fact that they are in different stables, Hidenoumi will not face him in competition as Japan Sumo Association rules prevent close relatives from being matched against each other outside of playoff bouts.

== Fighting style ==
Hidenoumi's most common winning techniques (kimarite) are oshidashi or push-out which accounts for 40% of his wins and yorikiri or force-out (30%). He favours a migi-yotsu (left hand outside, right hand inside) position when gripping his opponent's mawashi (belt).

== Career record ==
Hidenoumi Takuya
Year	January Hatsu basho, Tokyo	March Haru basho, Osaka	May Natsu basho, Tokyo	July Nagoya basho, Nagoya	September Aki basho, Tokyo	November Kyūshū basho, Fukuoka
2012	x	x	(Maezumō)	East Jonokuchi #17; 7–0–P; Champion	East Jonidan #11; 7–0–P; Champion	West Sandanme #18; 6–1
2013	East Makushita #36; 4–3	West Makushita #28; 3–4	West Makushita #39; 5–2	East Makushita #26; 4–3	West Makushita #20; 4–3	West Makushita #15; 4–3
2014	West Makushita #12; 4–3	West Makushita #8; 4–3	East Makushita #5; 3–4	East Makushita #9; 6–1	West Makushita #2; 6–1	East Jūryō #11; 7–5–3
2015	West Jūryō #11; 9–6	East Jūryō #7; 8–7	East Jūryō #5; 11–4	East Maegashira #13; 6–9	West Maegashira #15; 6–9	East Jūryō #3; 8–7
2016	West Jūryō #2; 11–4; Champion	West Maegashira #12; 7–8	West Maegashira #13; 5–10	East Jūryō #2; 7–8	East Jūryō #4; 9–6	East Maegashira #13; 4–11
2017	West Jūryō #1; 7–8	East Jūryō #3; 6–9	East Jūryō #5; 8–7	West Jūryō #2; 5–10	East Jūryō #7; 6–9	East Jūryō #10; 10–5
2018	West Jūryō #3; 10–5–P	West Maegashira #16; 3–12	West Jūryō #4; 7–8	West Jūryō #5; 7–8	East Jūryō #6; 8–7	West Jūryō #4; 6–9
2019	West Jūryō #8; 6–9	East Jūryō #10; 9–6	West Jūryō #6; 7–8	East Jūryō #7; 8–7	West Jūryō #6; 9–6	East Jūryō #4; 8–7
2020	West Jūryō #2; 8–7	West Jūryō #1; 6–9	West Jūryō #4; Tournament Cancelled; State of Emergency; 0–0–0	West Jūryō #4; 5–10	East Jūryō #9; 9–6	West Jūryō #5; 7–8
2021	West Jūryō #6; 11–4	West Maegashira #15; 10–5	East Maegashira #6; 5–10	East Maegashira #9; 7–8	West Maegashira #9; 7–8	West Maegashira #9; 8–7
2022	East Maegashira #8; Suspended; 0–0–15	West Jūryō #2; 8–7	West Jūryō #1; 8–7	West Jūryō #1; 6–9	East Jūryō #5; 8–7	East Jūryō #4; 4–11
2023	West Jūryō #9; 8–7	East Jūryō #8; 6–9	East Jūryō #11; 6–9	West Jūryō #12; 5–10	East Makushita #2; 5–2	West Jūryō #11; 6–7–2
2024	West Jūryō #11; 10–5	East Jūryō #7; 7–8	East Jūryō #8; 6–9	East Jūryō #9; 9–6	East Jūryō #6; 6–9	East Jūryō #7; 8–7
2025	East Jūryō #6; 7–8	West Jūryō #6; 10–5	East Jūryō #2; 10–5	West Maegashira #15; 2–11–2	West Jūryō #7; 6–9	East Jūryō #9; 5–10
2026	East Jūryō #13; 5–10	West Makushita #3; Retired; 3–4	x	x	x	x
Record given as wins–losses–absences Top division champion Top division runner-up Retired Non-participation Jūryō Lower divisions Sanshō key: F=Fighting spirit; O=Outstanding performance; T=Technique Also shown: ★=Kinboshi; P=Playoff(s); Divisions: Makuuchi — Jūryō — Makushita — Sandanme — Jonidan — Jonokuchi Makuuchi ranks: Yokozuna — Ōzeki — Sekiwake — Komusubi — Maegashira

== See also ==
- List of sumo tournament second division champions
- Glossary of sumo terms
- List of past sumo wrestlers
