= Daishōmaru Shōgo =

Japanese sumo wrestler

Daishōmaru Shōgo 大翔丸 翔伍
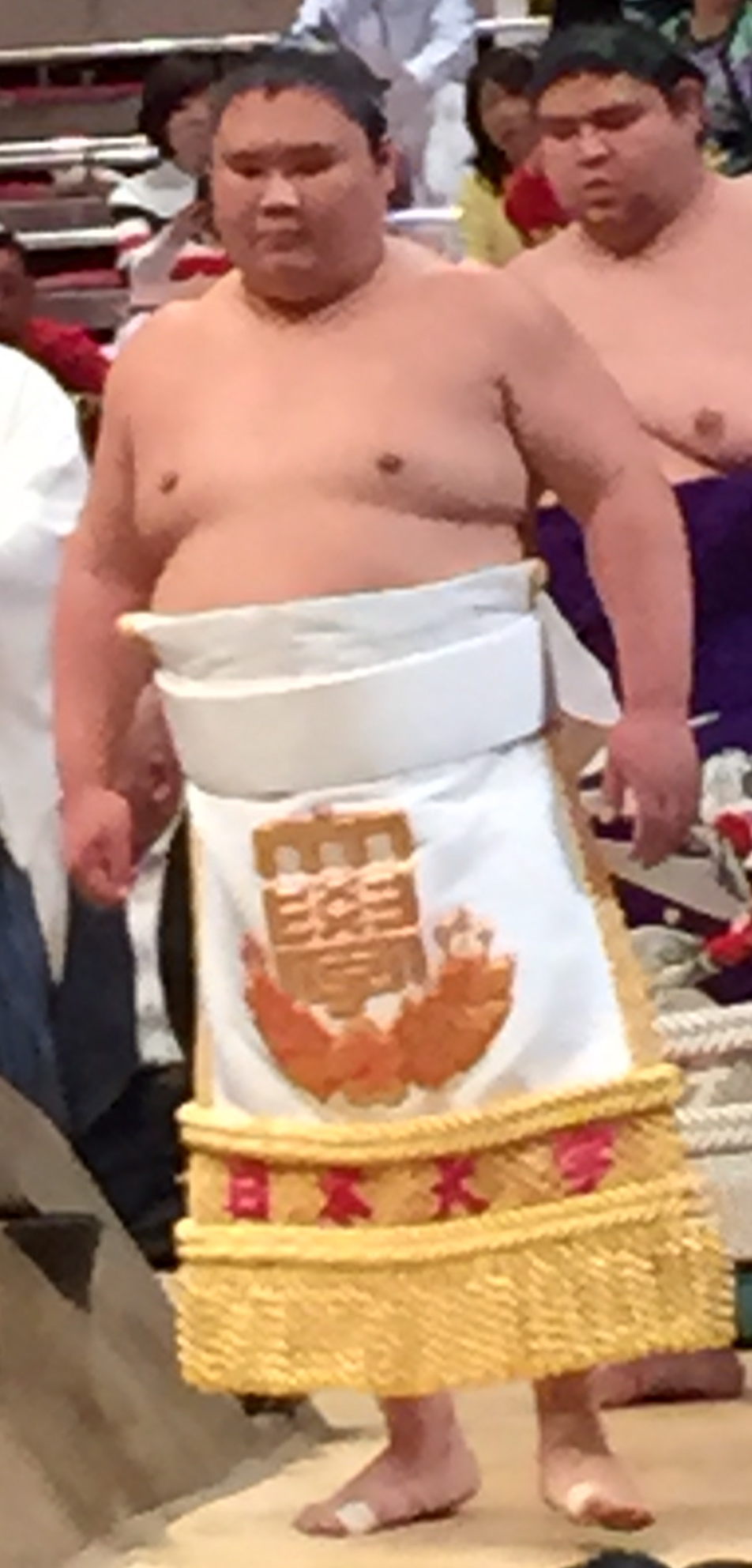
- Daishōmaru in 2015

Personal information
- Born: Shōgo Kawabata; 10 July 1991 (age 35) Hirano-ku, Osaka, Japan
- Height: 1.74 m (5 ft 8 1/2 in)
- Weight: 153 kg (337 lb)

Sport
- Sport: Sumo
- Rank: see below
- University team: Nihon University
- Retired: July 2026
- Heya: Oitekaze
- Debut: March 2014
- Highest rank: Maegashira 5 (July 2018)
- Championships: 1 (makushita)
- Updated on 1 November 2023

Daishōmaru Shōgo (Japanese: 大翔丸 翔伍; born 10 July 1991 as Shōgo Kawabata (川端 翔伍)) is a Japanese former professional sumo wrestler from Hirano-ku, Osaka. He made his debut in March 2014 at an elevated rank known as makushita tsukedashi and wrestled for Oitekaze stable. Daishōmaru retired in July 2026.

== Early life and sumo experience ==
Shōgo Kawabata began participating in amateur sumo from his fourth grade in primary school as part of his city's sumo league. In that same year, he came in third in a city-wide tournament. In his sixth year of primary school his performance earned him the title of children's sumo yokozuna. From middle school he moved away from his parents to be a boarding student at Meitoku Gijuku, a school known for its strong sports program, so he could further his sumo training. In his third year there, at a national tournament, he took the championship in the individual category. As the coach who had scouted him for his junior high school retired that year, he decided not to continue on to Meitoku High School and instead opted to enter Kanazawa Gakuin High School. As a regular member of his team, his school had a number of championships, but an individual title remained elusive until the last tournament of his high school years. He matriculated to Nihon University, which had a prestigious amateur sumo pedigree, joining the economics department. In his second year there, he suffered an injury to his left knee and was benched from his team. After making a recovery in his fourth year, he became the co-captain of his sumo team. That year his team came in third in the national school championship, though he only managed to make the best 16 in the individual category. However, following this in a national amateur sumo tournament, he found his stride and in the semi-finals he defeated his own upper-classman at Nihon University, then went on to take the championship by beating the captain of his own sumo team at Nihon University to take the championship. This achievement would allow him to meet the prerequisite to join professional sumo at the elevated rank of makushita tsukedashi.

== Career ==
In February 2014 he followed in the footsteps of his Nihon University teammate, the well-known Endō to join Oitekaze stable. (His stablemaster Oitekaze Oyakata, ex-Daishoyama, is also a Nihon University alumni.) This was the first time that two amateur yokozuna had joined the same stable two years in a row. He stepped onto the dohyō as a professional in March of the same year, with an impressive start. He beat the up-and-coming Dewahayate in his first appearance, and in his third match beat Tochinosato, his senior by two years at his alma mater. He then suffered his first two losses, then went on to win his final three matches of that tournament to post a strong 5-2 pro debut. He posted two winning tournaments in the following May and July, but had two setbacks in a row in September and November, posting two consecutive losing tournaments. His fortunes turned in 2015, where two strong performances of 6–1 and 5-2 in January and March in the upper ranks of makushita would allow him to join the salaried ranks of jūryō.

As is the tradition for many sumo wrestlers, on the occasion of his promotion to jūryō he changed his ring name from his surname to Daishōmaru. The characters for his ring name consisted of the character for large, the first character in his given name, and the character for circle, which can also signify a win. His jūryō debut in May 2015 did not meet expectations however, and a 6–9 result sent him back to makushita. This relegation seemed to put a fire under him, and in the following July tournament he took the always strongly contested makushita championship with a perfect 7–0 record with two days remaining in the tournament. He re-entered jūryō in September at a higher rank than previously, jūryō 8. Though he only managed to repeat his 6–9 record of his previous appearance, his higher ranking allowed him to avoid relegation as had happened previously. In his next two tournaments in November 2015 and January 2016 he gave very strong performances of 12–3 and 10-5 and was promoted to the top flight makuuchi division for the March tournament.

Though many wrestlers have a losing record in their top division debut, Daishōmaru managed an 8–7, followed by a 9–6 performance for the May tournament. In September 2017 he was on the tournament leaderboard at the halfway stage with a 7–1 record, although he finished on 10–5. Daishōmaru reached his highest rank to date of maegashira 5 in the July 2018 tournament. However, after a run of poor results he was demoted back to jūryō after the January 2019 tournament. After four tournaments in jūryō he won promotion back to makuuchi for the November 2019 tournament, but a 5–10 record saw him demoted to jūryō once again, and he has not returned to makuuchi as of September 2021.

During the July 2026 tournament, Daishōmaru announced his retirement after posting a losing record. At his press conference, he stated that he had reached his physical limits and said that his favorite match was the one against Ōsunaarashi on the final day of the March 2016 tournament.

== Fighting style ==
Daishōmaru is an oshi-sumo specialist who prefers pushing and thrusting techniques to using grips on the mawashi or belt. About half his career victories have been via the straightforward kimarite of oshi-dashi, or push out.

== Career record ==
Daishōmaru Shōgo
Year	January Hatsu basho, Tokyo	March Haru basho, Osaka	May Natsu basho, Tokyo	July Nagoya basho, Nagoya	September Aki basho, Tokyo	November Kyūshū basho, Fukuoka
2014	x	Makushita tsukedashi #15; 5–2	West Makushita #8; 4–3	East Makushita #6; 4–3	East Makushita #4; 3–4	Makushita #7; 3–4
2015	East Makushita #12; 6–1	West Makushita #1; 5–2	West Jūryō #12; 6–9	East Makushita #2; 7–0; Champion	West Jūryō #8; 6–9	East Jūryō #12; 12–3
2016	East Jūryō #5; 10–5	East Maegashira #14; 8–7	East Maegashira #13; 9–6	West Maegashira #7; 7–8	East Maegashira #8; 4–11	East Maegashira #12; 7–8
2017	West Maegashira #12; 7–8	West Maegashira #13; 7–8	West Maegashira #13; 8–7	West Maegashira #11; 7–8	East Maegashira #12; 10–5	East Maegashira #7; 4–11
2018	West Maegashira #11; 7–8	East Maegashira #13; 9–6	East Maegashira #9; 9–6	East Maegashira #5; 5–10	West Maegashira #9; 5–10	West Maegashira #14; 6–9
2019	West Maegashira #16; 3–12	West Jūryō #5; 6–9	West Jūryō #8; 8–7	East Jūryō #7; 9–6	East Jūryō #5; 10–5	East Maegashira #15; 5–10
2020	East Jūryō #3; 7–8	West Jūryō #4; 5–10	East Jūryō #7; Tournament Cancelled; State of Emergency; 0–0–0	East Jūryō #7; 8–7	East Jūryō #5; 5–10	West Jūryō #9; 8–7
2021	West Jūryō #8; 11–4	West Jūryō #2; 6–9	West Jūryō #4; 4–11	West Jūryō #11; 9–6	East Jūryō #7; 9–6	East Jūryō #3; 5–10
2022	West Jūryō #6; 6–9	West Jūryō #8; 5–10	West Jūryō #11; 4–11	West Makushita #3; 3–3–1	West Makushita #3; 3–4	East Makushita #5; 2–5
2023	East Makushita #12; 2–5	East Makushita #25; 2–5	East Makushita #42; 6–1	West Makushita #18; 2–5	West Makushita #35; 4–3	East Makushita #28; 5–2
2024	East Makushita #20; 6–1	East Makushita #8; 4–3	East Makushita #5; 3–4	East Makushita #8; 4–3	East Makushita #5; 3–4	East Makushita #9; 1–6
2025	West Makushita #34; 3–4	West Makushita #43; 4–3	East Makushita #36; 4–3	East Makushita #27; 2–5	East Makushita #46; 4–3	East Makushita #37; 1–6
2026	East Sandanme #6; 2–5	West Sandanme #34; 5–2	West Sandanme #8; 4–3	West Makushita #57; Retired; 3–4	x	x
Record given as wins–losses–absences Top division champion Top division runner-up Retired Lower divisions Non-participation Sanshō key: F=Fighting spirit; O=Outstanding performance; T=Technique Also shown: ★=Kinboshi; P=Playoff(s); Divisions: Makuuchi — Jūryō — Makushita — Sandanme — Jonidan — Jonokuchi Makuuchi ranks: Yokozuna — Ōzeki — Sekiwake — Komusubi — Maegashira

== See also ==
- Glossary of sumo terms
- List of active sumo wrestlers
