= Tobizaru Masaya =

Sumo wrestler

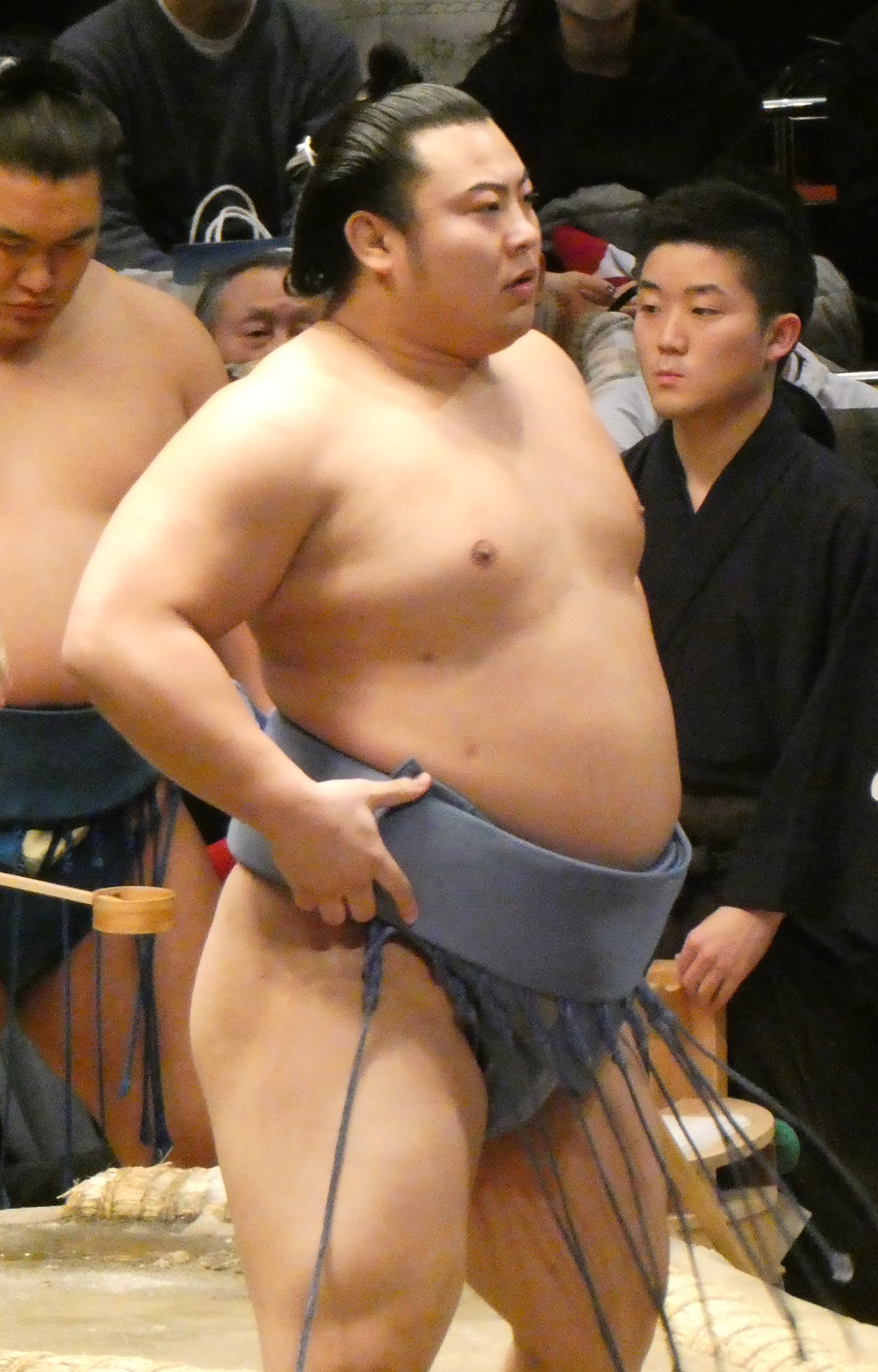
- Tobizaru in January 2022

Personal information
- Native name: 翔猿 正也
- Born: Masaya Iwasaki; April 24, 1992 (age 34) Edogawa, Tokyo, Japan
- Height: 1.73 m (5 ft 8 in)
- Weight: 135 kg (298 lb; 21.3 st)

Sport
- Sport: Sumo
- Rank: see below
- University team: Nihon University
- Heya: Oitekaze
- Debut: January 2015
- Highest rank: Komusubi (November, 2022)
- Special Prizes: Fighting Spirit (1); Outstanding Performance (1)
- Gold Stars: 3 (Terunofuji)
- Updated on 24 September 2023

Tobizaru Masaya (翔猿 正也, born April 24, 1992, as Masaya Iwasaki (岩﨑 正也, Iwasaki Masaya)) is a professional sumo wrestler from Japan and wrestles for Oitekaze stable. He made his top division debut in September 2020 and his san'yaku debut in November 2022. As of August 2023, Tobizaru is also the smallest makuuchi wrestler and the third smallest sekitori-ranked wrestler overall.

He is the brother of retired wrestler Hidenoumi of the Kise stable; they became the 18th pair of sekitori brothers in sumo history. Despite the fact that they are in different stables, Tobizaru will not face him in competition as Japan Sumo Association rules prevent close relatives from being matched against each other outside of playoff bouts.

== Career ==
Masaya Iwasaki followed his elder brother Takuya into sumo, joining the same sumo club in his first year of elementary school. He was also interested in baseball, and had thoughts of becoming a professional baseball player, but gave up the game for sumo when he started junior high school. The future Hokutofuji was a contemporary of his at high school. He studied economics at Nihon University and was a member of their sumo team, but weighing only around 110 kg and having to sit out a year with an ankle injury he did not manage to win any major amateur titles. Deciding to turn professional, he opted not to join his brother who was already a sekitori at Kise stable, preferring the challenge of making his way on his own. Instead he joined Oitekaze stable, also home to Endō who was two years his senior at university. He made his debut in January 2015, competing under his family name of Iwasaki. Upon reaching the jūryō division after the May 2017 tournament he changed his shikona to Tobizaru (literally "Flying Monkey") as he was born in the year of the monkey and he considers his darting movement in the sumo ring similar to a monkey. He recorded only six wins and nine losses in his jūryō debut in July and was demoted back to makushita in September 2017. His 5–2 record at Makushita 2 in the September tournament would normally have been good enough for an immediate re-promotion, but there were only two openings and priority went to Takagenji and Takanoshō. Tobizaru had to wait until the March 2018 tournament to return to jūryō, but he has maintained his sekitori status ever since.

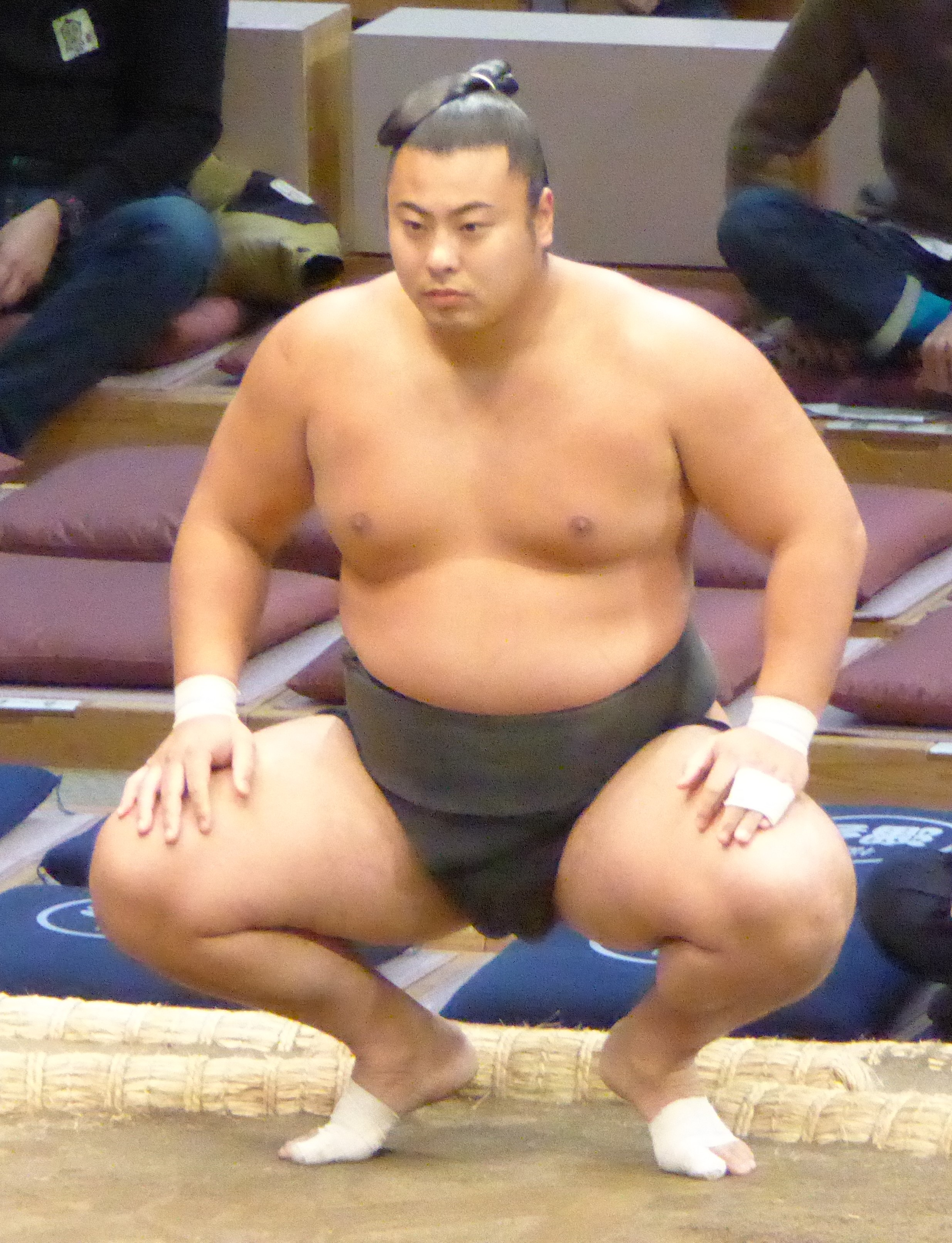
Tobizaru competing in the makushita division in November 2017

Tobizaru earned promotion to the top makuuchi division for the September 2020 tournament after a 9–6 record at Jūryō 2 in July. He and Hidenoumi became the 11th pair of brothers to both have reached makuuchi. Tobizaru said he hoped his brother would be able to earn promotion back to makuuchi. He was also the tenth member of Oitekaze stable to reach makuuchi since its founding, the last being Tsurugishō in September 2019. In his makuuchi debut he came close to becoming the first wrestler since Ryōgoku Kajinosuke II in 1914 to win the championship in his first top division tournament, needing to beat Shōdai on the final day to force a playoff, but he was defeated and finished with a 11–4 record. He was awarded the Fighting Spirit prize.

Tobizaru earned the first kinboshi of his career when he defeated yokozuna Terunofuji on the second day of the September 2022 tournament. Due to his strong showing in the September 2022 tournament, finishing with ten wins, Tobizaru was promoted to komusubi for November, his debut in the junior san'yaku ranks. At the November tournament he finished with a losing 7–8 record.

In January 2023 rankings Tobizaru was demoted from komusubi and started the New Year tournament as maegashira 1. In the January tournament he secured a winning record on the 15th day with a win over Kotoekō. In the March rankings he was again promoted to komusubi. Following a further demotion, Tobizaru continued to fight in the upper ranks of maegashira. At the July 2023 tournament, Tobizaru was involved in a controversial match against Sekiwake Hōshōryū, the latter being declared the winner of the match despite many spectators and journalists mentioning that his hand had touched the ring floor before Tobizaru had fallen. In response to the growing criticism, Nikkan Sports commented in an editorial that the judges had probably awarded the victory to Hōshōryū because he had shown himself to be dominant in the match and Tobizaru was not in a position to continue fighting. Tobizaru continued his tournament by winning his second kinboshi against Yokozuna Terunofuji. Commenting on this latest upset victory, he thanked sekiwake Daieishō for training him before the tournament.

Combining his victory over the yokozuna with a good score of 9–6, Tobizaru was promoted to komusubi for the third time for the September 2023 tournament. On this occasion he wished to establish himself as san'yaku for several tournaments in a row after losing this status with each previous promotion. Eventually, Tobizaru had a good tournament, winning in the first half of the tournament against two of the then three ōzeki, defeating Hōshōryū and Takakeishō on days three and eight respectively. Tobizaru however suffered an eighth defeat, when he lost his fourteenth match against former ōzeki Takayasu, effectively relegating him for the November tournament.

During the 2024 March tournament, Tobizaru stood out by defeating ōzeki Hōshōryū (on Day 6) and Kirishima (on Day 8). On Day 10, he withdrew from the competition due to symptoms of enteritis, though his stablemaster Oitekaze told the press that he should return to competition the following day.

During the first tournament of 2025, Tobizaru stood out by inflicting defeat on two of the then three ōzeki, beating Ōnosato on the first day and inflicting defeat on yokozuna-promotion seeker Kotozakura on the third day. On the fourth day, he won the third kinboshi of his career by defeating yokozuna Terunofuji. In February of the same year, rumors began to circulate that Tobizaru was abusing and harassing several of his tsukebito (assistants). When questioned by the Sumo Association's investigation unit, Tobizaru denied the accusations and announced his intention to sue the tabloids that had spread the rumours for defamation.

At the July 2025 tournament Tobizaru withdrew on Day 13 after winning just three matches. His medical certificate indicated injuries to his right elbow, which would require about four weeks of treatment. The injuries reportedly occurred while he was training the previous morning.

== Fighting style ==
Tobizaru is below the average size for an elite sumo wrestler, being the second lightest sekitori when he reached jūryō in 2017, and he stands just 175 cm (5 ft 9 in) tall. He is an oshi-sumo specialist, preferring to push his opponents rather than grab the mawashi or belt. He likes to pull his opponents down at the edge of the ring, with a high percentage of his victories being by hataki-komi (slap down) and hiki-otoshi (pull down). He is also good at kicks and leg sweeps. Having become the smallest wrestler in the makuuchi division in August 2023, Tobizaru also studied lively sumo styles in order to defeat opponents much taller than him, drawing inspiration in particular from Ura's style.

Tobizaru style is fast-paced, and he regularly sidestepped at the initial charge when in jūryō, but in his makuuchi debut made a conscious effort to fight more on the offensive. Referring to this change in sumo style, sports commentators often refer to Tobizaru's style as "gorilla" when he uses a more offensive and serious style, as opposed to a style associated to his flying monkey shikona, when Tobizaru uses a more trickery-based style, which has also been referred to as "circus sumo" by a member of the Yokozuna Deliberation Council, and sees him described as a "knave" (くせ者) by the press.

== Career record ==
Tobizaru Masaya
Year	January Hatsu basho, Tokyo	March Haru basho, Osaka	May Natsu basho, Tokyo	July Nagoya basho, Nagoya	September Aki basho, Tokyo	November Kyūshū basho, Fukuoka
2015	(Maezumō)	West Jonokuchi #17; 6–1	West Jonidan #30; 6–1	West Sandanme #66; 6–1	Sandanme #11; 6–1	West Makushita #37; 5–2
2016	East Makushita #24; 4–3	West Makushita #19; 4–3	West Makushita #13; 4–3	West Makushita #10; 4–3	West Makushita #7; 5–2	East Makushita #3; 2–5
2017	East Makushita #10; 6–1	East Makushita #3; 4–3	West Makushita #2; 6–1	West Jūryō #14; 6–9	East Makushita #2; 5–2	West Makushita #1; 3–4
2018	West Makushita #3; 4–3	East Jūryō #13; 7–8	West Jūryō #13; 7–8	West Jūryō #13; 9–6	East Jūryō #10; 7–8	West Jūryō #11; 8–7
2019	West Jūryō #10; 7–8	East Jūryō #11; 7–8	West Jūryō #12; 10–5	West Jūryō #6; 7–8	West Jūryō #8; 6–9	East Jūryō #10; 8–7
2020	West Jūryō #6; 9–6	East Jūryō #4; 10–5	East Jūryō #2; Tournament Cancelled; State of Emergency; 0–0–0	East Jūryō #2; 9–6	East Maegashira #14; 11–4; F	West Maegashira #4; 6–9
2021	West Maegashira #7; 6–9	West Maegashira #8; 10–5	West Maegashira #2; 5–10	West Maegashira #3; 4–11	West Maegashira #8; 7–8	West Maegashira #8; 7–8
2022	West Maegashira #8; 6–9	East Maegashira #9; 9–6	West Maegashira #5; 7–8	West Maegashira #6; 8–5–2	East Maegashira #1; 10–5; O★	East Komusubi #2; 7–8
2023	East Maegashira #1; 8–7	West Komusubi #2; 6–9	East Maegashira #3; 8–7	West Maegashira #1; 9–6 ★	West Komusubi #1; 6–9	West Maegashira #3; 7–8
2024	East Maegashira #4; 7–8	East Maegashira #4; 8–7	West Maegashira #3; 6–9	East Maegashira #4; 9–6	West Maegashira #1; 5–10	East Maegashira #5; 9–6
2025	East Maegashira #2; 7–8 ★	East Maegashira #3; 6–9	West Maegashira #6; 7–8	East Maegashira #7; 3–10–2	East Maegashira #15; 9–6	West Maegashira #9; 6–9
2026	East Maegashira #13; 7–8	East Maegashira #13; 6–9	East Maegashira #15; 9–6	West Maegashira #9; 5–10	East Maegashira #14; 4–11	West Jūryō #2; 11–4
Record given as wins–losses–absences Top division champion Top division runner-up Retired Non-participation Jūryō Lower divisions Sanshō key: F=Fighting spirit; O=Outstanding performance; T=Technique Also shown: ★=Kinboshi; P=Playoff(s); Divisions: Makuuchi — Jūryō — Makushita — Sandanme — Jonidan — Jonokuchi Makuuchi ranks: Yokozuna — Ōzeki — Sekiwake — Komusubi — Maegashira

== See also ==
- Glossary of sumo terms
- List of active sumo wrestlers
- List of active gold star earners
- List of active special prize winners
- List of komusubi
