= Oitekaze stable =

Organization of sumo wrestlers

Coordinates: 35.8126°N 139.8144°E

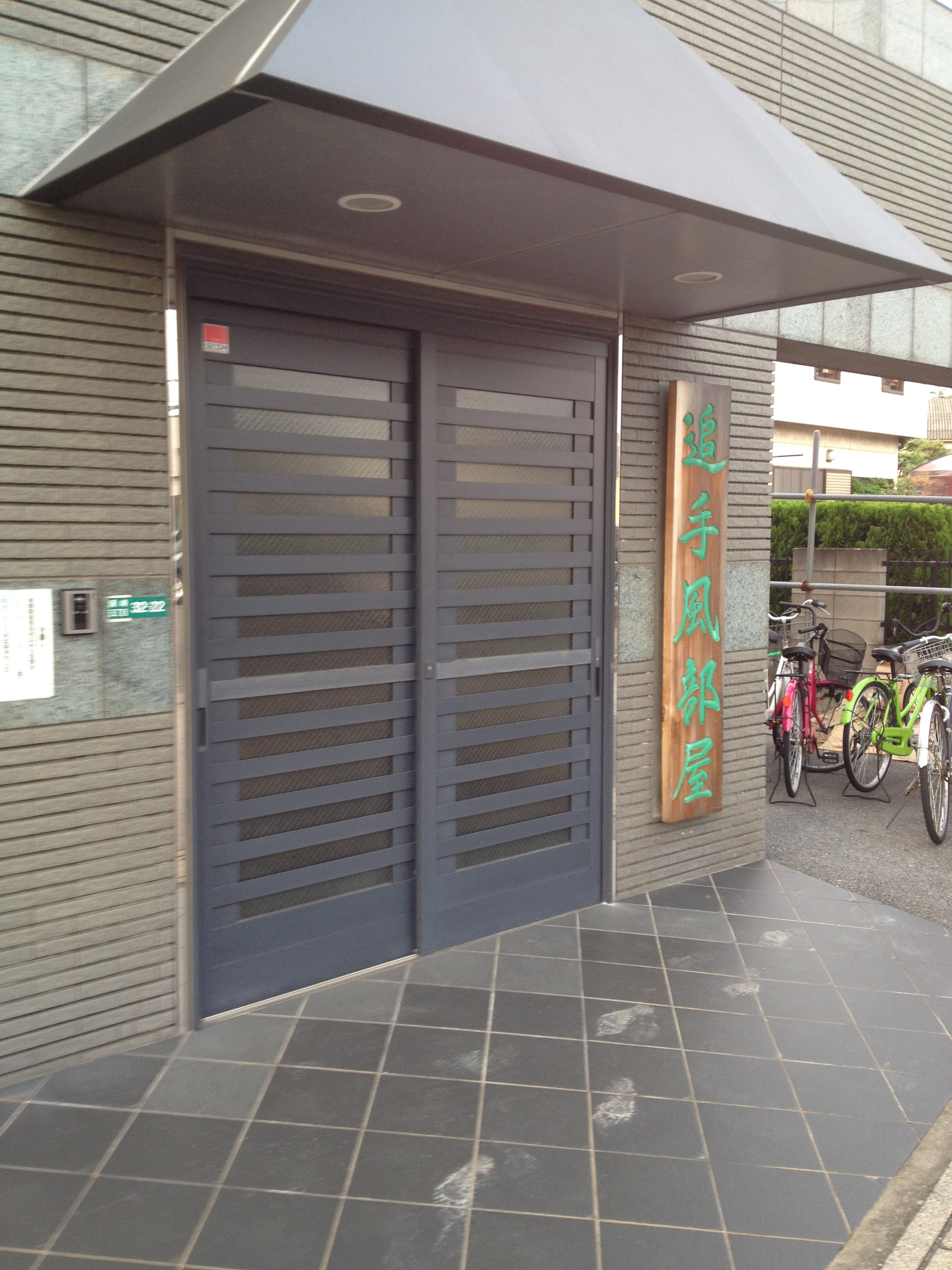

The Oitekaze stable (追手風部屋, Oitekaze-beya) is a stable of sumo wrestlers, part of the Tokitsukaze ichimon or group of stables. It was established in its modern incarnation on 1 October 1998 by former maegashira Daishōyama, who is the stable's current head coach. He had married the daughter of the previous Oitekaze and branched off from Tomozuna stable, taking some wrestlers with him including future sekitori Hayateumi and Daishōdai. As of January 2023, it had 18 wrestlers, of which seven were sekitori. As of 2019, eight wrestlers in the stable's history have reached the top makuuchi division.

In December 2016, the stable moved from the Isegahama to the Tokitsukaze ichimon.

In April 2024, coach Tatsutayama transferred from the former Michinoku stable, following the latter's closure after the retirement of former Kirishima.

As of May 2026, the stable has 21 active wrestlers.

== Ring name conventions ==
Many wrestlers at this stable take ring names or shikona that begin with the characters 大翔 (read: daishō) or simply 大 (read: dai), in deference to their coach and the stable's owner, the former Daishōyama.

== Owner ==
- 1998–present: 11th Oitekaze (riji, maegashira Daishōyama, born 1966)

== Notable active wrestlers ==
- Daieishō (best rank sekiwake)
- Tobizaru (best rank komusubi)
- Hitoshi (best rank maegashira)

== Coaches ==
- Takashima Daizō (san'yo, sekiwake Kōbōyama, born 1957)
- Tatsutayama Hironori (san'yo, maegashira Sasshūnada, born 1957)
- Kitajin Shōta (toshiyori, komusubi Endō, born 1990)
- Kagamiyama Shoji (san'yo, sekiwake Kōbōyama, born 1958)

== Notable former members ==
- Hayateumi (former sekiwake)
- Kokkai (former komusubi)
- Endō (former komusubi)
- Tsurugishō (former maegashira)
- Daishōhō (former maegashira)
- Daiamami (former maegashira)
- Hamanishiki (former maegashira)
- Daishōmaru (former maegashira)

== Referee ==
- Shikimori Kiichirō (makuuchi gyōji, real name Osamu Wachi, born 1974)

== Hairdressers ==
- Tokosaku (second class tokoyama, born 1979)
- Tokokaze (fourth class tokoyama, born 1991)

== Location and access ==
Saitama prefecture, Sōka City, Sezaki 5-32-22
15 minute walk from Yatsuka Station on Tōbu Isesaki Line

== See also ==
- List of sumo stables
- List of active sumo wrestlers
- List of past sumo wrestlers
- Glossary of sumo terms
