= 2016 in sumo =

The following were the events in professional sumo during 2016.

== Tournaments ==
=== Hatsu basho ===
Ryōgoku Kokugikan, Tokyo, 10 January – 24 January

2016 Hatsu basho results - Makuuchi Division
W		L		A	East			Rank	West			W		L		A
12	-	3	-	0		(Mongolia)	**Harumafuji**	Y		(Mongolia)	**Hakuho**	12	-	3	-	0
10	-	5	-	0		(Mongolia)	**Kakuryū**	Y	ø							
9	-	6	-	0		(Japan)	**Kisenosato**	O	ø	(Mongolia)	Terunofuji	3	-	3	-	9
14	-	1	-	0		(Japan)	**Kotoshogiku**	O		(Japan)	Gōeidō	4	-	11	-	0
7	-	8	-	0		(Japan)	Tochiozan	S		(Japan)	**Yoshikaze**	8	-	7	-	0
5	-	10	-	0		(Japan)	Ikioi	K		(Georgia (country))	Tochinoshin	6	-	9	-	0
6	-	8	-	1		(Japan)	Aminishiki	M1		(Japan)	Shōhōzan	5	-	10	-	0
8	-	7	-	0		(Japan)	**Takarafuji**	M2		(Bulgaria)	Aoiyama	7	-	8	-	0
2	-	13	-	0		(Mongolia)	Ichinojō	M3		(Brazil)	Kaisei	5	-	10	-	0
7	-	8	-	0		(Mongolia)	Kyokushūhō	M4		(Japan)	**Kotoyūki**	9	-	6	-	0
0	-	0	-	15	ø	(Egypt)	Ōsunaarashi	M5		(China)	**Sōkokurai**	8	-	7	-	0
4	-	11	-	0		(Japan)	Tokushōryū	M6		(Japan)	**Okinoumi**	10	-	5	-	0
12	-	3	-	0		(Japan)	**Toyonoshima**	M7		(Mongolia)	Tamawashi	5	-	10	-	0
8	-	7	-	0		(Japan)	**Myōgiryū**	M8		(Japan)	**Takayasu**	11	-	4	-	0
7	-	8	-	0		(Japan)	Sadanoumi	M9		(Georgia (country))	Gagamaru	7	-	8	-	0
5	-	7	-	3		(Japan)	Chiyootori	M10		(Japan)	Mitakeumi	5	-	8	-	2
1	-	6	-	8	ø	(Japan)	Endō	M11		(Russia)	Amūru	7	-	8	-	0
8	-	7	-	0		(Japan)	**Chiyotairyū**	M12		(Japan)	**Shodai**	10	-	5	-	0
10	-	5	-	0		(Japan)	**Takekaze**	M13		(Mongolia)	**Takanoiwa**	9	-	6	-	0
2	-	4	-	9	ø	(Japan)	Jōkōryū	M14		(Japan)	**Toyohibiki**	8	-	7	-	0
4	-	11	-	0		(Japan)	Homarefuji	M15		(Japan)	Kitataiki	7	-	8	-	0
4	-	11	-	0		(Japan)	Kagayaki	M16								

ø - Indicates a pull-out or absent rank
**winning record in bold**
**Yusho Winner**

=== Haru basho ===
Osaka Prefectural Gymnasium, Osaka, 13 March – 27 March

2016 Haru basho results - Makuuchi Division
W		L		A	East		Rank	West			W		L		A
9	-	6	-	0	(Mongolia)	**Harumafuji**	Y		(Mongolia)	**Hakuho**	14	-	1	-	0
10	-	5	-	0	(Mongolia)	**Kakuryū**	Y	ø							
8	-	7	-	0	(Japan)	**Kotoshogiku**	O		(Japan)	**Kisenosato**	13	-	2	-	0
12	-	3	-	0	(Japan)	**Gōeidō**	O		(Mongolia)	**Terunofuji**	8	-	7	-	0
4	-	11	-	0	(Japan)	Yoshikaze	S		(Japan)	Toyonoshima	3	-	12	-	0
4	-	11	-	0	(Japan)	Tochiozan	K		(Japan)	Takarafuji	6	-	9	-	0
12	-	3	-	0	(Japan)	**Kotoyūki**	M1		(Japan)	Takayasu	5	-	10	-	0
8	-	7	-	0	(Japan)	**Okinoumi**	M2		(Georgia (country))	Tochinoshin	6	-	9	-	0
7	-	8	-	0	(Bulgaria)	Aoiyama	M3		(Japan)	Aminishiki	7	-	8	-	0
10	-	5	-	0	(Japan)	**Ikioi**	M4		(China)	Sōkokurai	5	-	8	-	2
6	-	9	-	0	(Mongolia)	Kyokushūhō	M5		(Japan)	Shōhōzan	4	-	11	-	0
10	-	5	-	0	(Japan)	**Myōgiryū**	M6		(Japan)	**Shodai**	9	-	6	-	0
5	-	10	-	0	(Japan)	Takekaze	M7		(Brazil)	**Kaisei**	11	-	4	-	0
8	-	7	-	0	(Mongolia)	**Takanoiwa**	M8		(Japan)	Chiyotairyū	3	-	12	-	0
3	-	12	-	0	(Japan)	Toyohibiki	M9		(Japan)	Sadanoumi	7	-	8	-	0
5	-	10	-	0	(Georgia (country))	Gagamaru	M10		(Mongolia)	**Tamawashi**	9	-	6	-	0
11	-	4	-	0	(Mongolia)	**Ichinojō**	M11		(Russia)	Amūru	7	-	8	-	0
8	-	7	-	0	(Japan)	**Tokushōryū**	M12		(Japan)	Hidenoumi	7	-	8	-	0
8	-	7	-	0	(Japan)	**Chiyootori**	M13		(Japan)	**Mitakeumi**	10	-	5	-	0
8	-	7	-	0	(Japan)	**Daishōmaru**	M14		(Japan)	**Daieisho**	10	-	5	-	0
6	-	9	-	0	(Japan)	Satoyama	M15		(Japan)	Kitataiki	3	-	12	-	0
4	-	11	-	0	(Japan)	Akiseyama	M16								

ø - Indicates a pull-out or absent rank
**winning record in bold**
**Yusho Winner**

=== Natsu basho ===
Ryōgoku Kokugikan, Tokyo, 8 May – 22 May

2016 Natsu basho results - Makuuchi Division
W		L		A	East			Rank	West			W		L		A
15	-	0	-	0		(Mongolia)	**Hakuho**	Y		(Mongolia)	**Kakuryū**	11	-	4	-	0
10	-	5	-	0		(Mongolia)	**Harumafuji**	Y	ø							
13	-	2	-	0		(Japan)	**Kisenosato**	O		(Japan)	**Gōeidō**	9	-	6	-	0
10	-	5	-	0		(Japan)	**Kotoshogiku**	O		(Mongolia)	Terunofuji	2	-	13	-	0
7	-	8	-	0		(Japan)	Kotoyūki	S		(Japan)	Ikioi	4	-	11	-	0
8	-	7	-	0		(Brazil)	**Kaisei**	K		(Japan)	Okinoumi	6	-	9	-	0
6	-	9	-	0		(Japan)	Myōgiryū	M1		(Japan)	Takarafuji	7	-	8	-	0
6	-	9	-	0		(Japan)	Shodai	M2		(Mongolia)	Ichinojō	5	-	10	-	0
6	-	9	-	0		(Bulgaria)	Aoiyama	M3	ø	(Japan)	Aminishiki	1	-	2	-	12
7	-	8	-	0		(Japan)	Yoshikaze	M4		(Georgia (country))	**Tochinoshin**	10	-	5	-	0
8	-	7	-	0		(Japan)	**Tochiozan**	M5		(Japan)	**Takayasu**	9	-	6	-	0
5	-	10	-	0		(Mongolia)	Takanoiwa	M6		(Mongolia)	Tamawashi	4	-	11	-	0
5	-	10	-	0		(Japan)	Toyonoshima	M7		(Egypt)	**Ōsunaarashi**	9	-	6	-	0
0	-	0	-	15	ø	(Mongolia)	Kyokushūhō	M8		(Japan)	**Mitakeumi**	11	-	4	-	0
7	-	8	-	0		(China)	Sōkokurai	M9		(Japan)	Daieisho	6	-	9	-	0
7	-	8	-	0		(Japan)	Sadanoumi	M10		(Japan)	Tokushōryū	6	-	9	-	0
8	-	7	-	0		(Japan)	**Chiyootori**	M11		(Japan)	**Shōhōzan**	11	-	4	-	0
8	-	7	-	0		(Japan)	**Takekaze**	M12		(Russia)	Amūru	3	-	8	-	4
9	-	6	-	0		(Japan)	**Daishōmaru**	M13		(Japan)	Hidenoumi	5	-	10	-	0
7	-	8	-	0		(Japan)	Nishikigi	M14		(Mongolia)	Seirō	5	-	10	-	0
6	-	9	-	0		(Georgia (country))	Gagamaru	M15		(Japan)	**Endō**	11	-	4	-	0
6	-	9	-	0		(Japan)	Chiyotairyū	M16								

ø - Indicates a pull-out or absent rank
**winning record in bold**
**Yusho Winner**

=== Nagoya basho ===
Aichi Prefectural Gymnasium, Nagoya, 10 July – 24 July

2016 Nagoya basho results - Makuuchi Division
W		L		A	East			Rank	West			W		L		A
10	-	5	-	0		(Mongolia)	**Hakuho**	Y	ø	(Mongolia)	Kakuryū	2	-	2	-	11
13	-	2	-	0		(Mongolia)	**Harumafuji**	Y	ø							
12	-	3	-	0		(Japan)	**Kisenosato**	O	ø	(Japan)	Kotoshogiku	1	-	6	-	8
7	-	8	-	0		(Japan)	Gōeidō	O		(Mongolia)	**Terunofuji**	8	-	7	-	0
7	-	8	-	0		(Brazil)	Kaisei	S		(Georgia (country))	Tochinoshin	6	-	9	-	0
2	-	13	-	0		(Japan)	Kotoyūki	K		(Japan)	**Takayasu**	11	-	4	-	0
5	-	10	-	0		(Japan)	Mitakeumi	M1		(Japan)	**Tochiozan**	8	-	7	-	0
8	-	7	-	0		(Japan)	**Okinoumi**	M2		(Japan)	**Takarafuji**	10	-	5	-	0
0	-	1	-	14	ø	(Egypt)	Ōsunaarashi	M3		(Japan)	Myōgiryū	7	-	8	-	0
5	-	10	-	0		(Japan)	Shōhōzan	M4		(Japan)	Ikioi	5	-	10	-	0
9	-	6	-	0		(Japan)	**Shodai**	M5		(Japan)	**Yoshikaze**	10	-	5	-	0
8	-	7	-	0		(Bulgaria)	**Aoiyama**	M6		(Japan)	Endō	3	-	12	-	0
9	-	6	-	0		(Mongolia)	**Ichinojō**	M7		(Japan)	Daishōmaru	7	-	8	-	0
9	-	6	-	0		(Japan)	**Chiyoōtori**	M8		(Japan)	Takekaze	6	-	9	-	0
8	-	5	-	2	ø	(Japan)	Chiyonokuni	M9		(China)	Sōkokurai	6	-	9	-	0
12	-	3	-	0		(Mongolia)	**Takanoiwa**	M10		(Japan)	Sadanoumi	7	-	8	-	0
0	-	0	-	15	ø	(Japan)	Toyonoshima	M11		(Japan)	Daieisho	5	-	10	-	0
9	-	6	-	0		(Mongolia)	**Tamawashi**	M12		(Japan)	Tokushōryū	6	-	9	-	0
7	-	8	-	0		(Japan)	Toyohibiki	M13	ø	(Japan)	Aminishiki	0	-	0	-	15
7	-	8	-	0		(Japan)	Kagayaki	M14		(Japan)	**Nishikigi**	9	-	6	-	0
6	-	9	-	0		(Japan)	Kitaharima	M15		(Japan)	Sadanofuji	4	-	11	-	0
9	-	6	-	0		(Mongolia)	**Arawashi**	M16								

ø - Indicates a pull-out or absent rank
**winning record in bold**
**Yusho Winner**

=== Aki basho ===
Ryōgoku Kokugikan, Tokyo, 11 September – 25 September

2016 Aki basho results - Makuuchi Division
W		L		A	East		Rank	West			W		L		A
12	-	3	-	0	(Mongolia)	**Harumafuji**	Y	ø	(Mongolia)	Hakuho	0	-	0	-	15
10	-	5	-	0	(Mongolia)	**Kakuryū**	Y	ø							
10	-	5	-	0	(Japan)	**Kisenosato**	O		(Mongolia)	Terunofuji	4	-	11	-	0
15	-	0	-	0	(Japan)	**Gōeidō**	O		(Japan)	**Kotoshogiku**	9	-	6	-	0
10	-	5	-	0	(Japan)	**Takayasu**	S		(Japan)	Takarafuji	4	-	11	-	0
6	-	9	-	0	(Brazil)	Kaisei	K		(Japan)	Tochiozan	7	-	8	-	0
9	-	6	-	0	(Japan)	**Okinoumi**	M1		(Japan)	Yoshikaze	7	-	8	-	0
5	-	10	-	0	(Georgia (country))	Tochinoshin	M2		(Japan)	Shodai	7	-	8	-	0
5	-	10	-	0	(Mongolia)	Takanoiwa	M3	ø	(Mongolia)	Ichinojō	0	-	0	-	15
5	-	10	-	0	(Japan)	Myōgiryū	M4	ø	(Japan)	Chiyoōtori	1	-	10	-	4
9	-	6	-	0	(Bulgaria)	**Aoiyama**	M5		(Japan)	**Mitakeumi**	10	-	5	-	0
8	-	7	-	0	(Japan)	**Chiyonokuni**	M6		(Mongolia)	**Tamawashi**	10	-	5	-	0
8	-	7	-	0	(Japan)	**Shōhōzan**	M7		(Japan)	Ikioi	7	-	8	-	0
4	-	11	-	0	(Japan)	Daishōmaru	M8		(Japan)	**Kotoyūki**	10	-	5	-	0
8	-	7	-	0	(Japan)	**Nishikigi**	M9		(Japan)	**Takekaze**	8	-	7	-	0
7	-	8	-	0	(Mongolia)	Arawashi	M10		(Japan)	**Sadanoumi**	8	-	7	-	0
5	-	10	-	0	(China)	Sōkokurai	M11	ø	(Japan)	Homarefuji	0	-	4	-	11
5	-	10	-	0	(Georgia (country))	Gagamaru	M12		(Mongolia)	**Chiyoshōma**	8	-	7	-	0
5	-	10	-	0	(Japan)	Amakaze	M13		(Japan)	Toyohibiki	6	-	9	-	0
13	-	2	-	0	(Japan)	**Endō**	M14		(Japan)	**Kagayaki**	9	-	6	-	0
6	-	9	-	0	(Japan)	Tokushōryū	M15		(Mongolia)	**Kyokushūhō**	8	-	7	-	0
5	-	10	-	0	(Japan)	Daieisho	M16								

ø - Indicates a pull-out or absent rank
**winning record in bold**
**Yusho Winner**

=== Kyushu basho ===
Fukuoka Kokusai Center, Kyushu, 13 November – 27 November

2016 Kyushu basho results - Makuuchi Division
W		L		A	East		Rank	West			W		L		A
11	-	4	-	0	(Mongolia)	**Harumafuji**	Y		(Mongolia)	**Kakuryū**	14	-	1	-	0
11	-	4	-	0	(Mongolia)	**Hakuho**	Y	ø							
9	-	6	-	0	(Japan)	**Gōeidō**	O		(Japan)	**Kisenosato**	12	-	3	-	0
5	-	10	-	0	(Japan)	Kotoshogiku	O		(Mongolia)	**Terunofuji**	8	-	7	-	0
7	-	8	-	0	(Japan)	Takayasu	S		(Japan)	Okinoumi	5	-	10	-	0
6	-	9	-	0	(Japan)	Mitakeumi	K		(Mongolia)	**Tamawashi**	10	-	5	-	0
9	-	6	-	0	(Japan)	Tochiozan	M1		(Bulgaria)	Aoiyama	4	-	11	-	0
3	-	12	-	0	(Brazil)	Kaisei	M2		(Japan)	Yoshikaze	6	-	9	-	0
7	-	8	-	0	(Japan)	Endō	M3		(Japan)	**Shodai**	11	-	4	-	0
6	-	9	-	0	(Japan)	Kotoyūki	M4		(Japan)	Chiyonokuni	5	-	10	-	0
8	-	7	-	0	(Japan)	**Shōhōzan**	M5		(Japan)	**Takarafuji**	9	-	6	-	0
4	-	11	-	0	(Japan)	Nishikigi	M6		(Georgia (country))	**Tochinoshin**	10	-	5	-	0
9	-	6	-	0	(Japan)	**Takekaze**	M7		(Mongolia)	Takanoiwa	6	-	9	-	0
3	-	12	-	0	(Japan)	Sadanoumi	M8		(Japan)	**Ikioi**	10	-	5	-	0
8	-	7	-	0	(Japan)	**Myōgiryū**	M9		(Japan)	Kagayaki	6	-	9	-	0
9	-	6	-	0	(Mongolia)	**Chiyoshōma**	M10		(Mongolia)	**Arawashi**	11	-	4	-	0
3	-	12	-	0	(Mongolia)	Kyokushūhō	M11		(Japan)	**Hokutofuji**	9	-	6	-	0
7	-	8	-	0	(Japan)	Daishōmaru	M12		(Japan)	Chiyoōtori	6	-	9	-	0
4	-	11	-	0	(Japan)	Hidenoumi	M13		(Mongolia)	Ichinojō	7	-	8	-	0
9	-	6	-	0	(China)	**Sōkokurai**	M14		(Japan)	Chiyotairyū	7	-	8	-	0
10	-	5	-	0	(Japan)	**Ishiura**	M15		(Japan)	Toyohibiki	6	-	9	-	0
8	-	7	-	0	(Georgia (country))	**Gagamaru**	M16								

ø - Indicates a pull-out or absent rank
**winning record in bold**
**Yusho Winner**

== News ==
=== January ===
- 7: Yokozuna Hakuhō, Harumafuji and Kakuryū perform the hono dohyo-iri or New Year ring-entering ceremony before crowds at the Meiji Shrine in Tokyo.
- 10: Emperor Akihito and Empress Michiko attend the first day of the New Year tournament in Tokyo, and express their sadness over the recent death of the Sumo Association chairman, Kitanoumi.
- 24: Kotoshōgiku defeats all three yokozuna to win his first top division championship, becoming the first Japanese born wrestler to win the top division championship since Tochiazuma in 2006. He finishes with a 14–1 record. His only defeat is to maegashira Toyonoshima. Toyonoshima is the runner-up on 12–3, shared with Hakuhō and Harumafuji. Toyonoshima is also given the Outstanding Performance award. The Fighting Spirit Award goes to Shōdai, who scores 10–5 on his top division debut. Yoshikaze achieves an 8–7 record in his sekiwake debut. Hidenoumi, two tournaments after being demoted to jūryō, gets his first sekitori championship with an 11–4 record and will be promoted back to the top division next tournament. Two promising young Japanese wrestlers, Jokoryu (2–4–9) and Endo (1–6–8), both pull out through injury and will be demoted to the second division. Ōzeki Terunofuji also withdraws and will be kadoban in March, alongside Gōeidō who scores only 4–11.

=== February ===
- 7: The 40th Fuji TV Grand Sumo exhibition tournament takes place at the Kokugikan. In addition to the usual knock-out tournament featuring active wrestlers (won by Hakuho who defeats Harumafuji in the final), there are three matches featuring oyakata: Takamisakari (Furiwake Oyakata) vs Hōmashō (Tatsutagawa), Kyokutenhō (Oshima) vs Tokitsuumi (Tokitsukaze), and Kotoōshū (Naruto) vs Kotonishiki (Asahiyama).
- 29 The banzuke for the upcoming tournament in Osaka is released. Toyonoshima returns to the sekiwake rank for the first time since 2012. There are two makuuchi debutants, amateur champion Daishōmaru and journeyman Akiseyama, while Satoyama, Daieishō and Hidenoumi return to the top division. Ōsunaarashi, Jokoryu and Endo lose makuuchi status due to absence through injury, as do Homarefuji and Kagayaki. There are no new sekitori, but Shōtenrō returns to juryo at the expense of Tokitenkū, who is having treatment for lymphoma.

=== March ===
- 24: Shibatayama Oyakata and one of his wrestlers are ordered by the Tokyo District Court to pay 32.4 million yen (287,500 USD) in compensation to a former wrestler who the court ruled had faced "daily abuse" since joining in 2008 and had to undergo four surgeries for a detached retina, eventually losing sight in the eye in 2013. Shibatayama says he will appeal the ruling.
- 26: On the final day of the Osaka tournament, Hakuho wins his 36th yusho, and first since July 2015 in Nagoya, by sidestepping Harumafuji at the initial charge. Having won fourteen straight matches after an opening day defeat to Takarafuji, he finishes on 14–1, one win ahead of ozeki Kisenosato on 13–2. Gōeidō has his best tournament as an ozeki, with a 12–3 score. Kotoshogiku, by contrast, finishes on 8–7, his yokozuna hopes dashed. The Outstanding Performance Award goes to Kotoyuki who scores 12–3 and has defeated a yokozuna and two ozeki. Ikioi scores 10–5 but fails to win on the final day and so misses out on the Fighting Spirit Prize. Osunaarashi wins the juryo division championship with a 13–2 record, ensuring his immediate return to makuuchi. The makushita champion is won by Satō with a perfect 7–0 record, guaranteeing his promotion to juryo next time.
- 28: The results of elections to the Sumo Association's board of directors are announced. Hakkaku Oyakata is confirmed as chairman, a position he has already been in since the death of the previous incumbent Kitanoumi in November last year. His only rival for the post, Takanohana, receives the backing of only two directors, with Hakkaku winning the support of six.
- 30: The various roles of the new board are announced. Oguruma Oyakata is the senior executive manager, Nishonoseki is the new head of the judging department, replacing Isegahama, Takanohana is in charge of jungyo (regional tours), Kasugano is head of PR, and Kagamiyama will head the planning department.
- 30: Promotions to juryo are announced. Joining Sato are Ura, a former amateur competitor from Kwansei Gakuin University, and the returning Tamaasuka, a veteran who is being promoted to juryo for the seventh time.

=== April ===
- The spring regional tour visits the following locations:
  - 3: Ise Shrine (Honozumo ceremonial tournament held in the shine’s precincts), Mie Prefecture
  - 4: Iga, Mie Prefecture
  - 5: Izumisano, Osaka Prefecture
  - 6: Okazaki, Aichi Prefecture
  - 7: Matsumoto, Nagano Prefecture
  - 8: Tatebayashi, Gunma Prefecture
  - 9: Fujisawa, Kanagawa Prefecture
  - 10: Shizuoka, Shizuoka Prefecture
  - 12: Tsukuba, Ibaraki Prefecture
  - 13: Kawasaki, Kanagawa Prefecture
  - 14: Machida, Tokyo
  - 16: Takasaki, Gunma Prefecture
  - 17: Kawaguchi, Saitama Prefecture
  - 18:Yasukuni Shrine (Honozumo ceremonial tournament held in the shrine’s precincts), Tokyo
  - 19: Saku, Nagano Prefecture
  - 20: Toyama, Toyama Prefecture
- 25: The banzuke for the May tournament is released. Ikioi and Kotoyuki both make their debuts at sekiwake. Kaisei becomes the first wrestler from Brazil to reach komusubi. Nishikigi will make his top division debut, while Osunaarashi, Endo and Seiro all return.

=== May ===
- 22: Hakuho wins his 37th championship with a perfect 15–0 record, his twelfth zensho-yusho (and first since January 2015). Kisenosato is once again runner-up, with a 13–2 score. He is the first ozeki to win at least thirteen bouts in two consecutive tournaments and not get promoted to yokozuna since Hakuho in 2006. Tochinoshin wins his first Technique Prize, while the Fighting Spirit Award goes to Mitakeumi. Terunofuji, struggling with injuries, loses 13 consecutive matches from Day 3 onwards and finishes on 2–13, equal to the worst ever record for an ozeki. The juryo division championship is won by Chiyonokuni.

=== June ===
- 27: The rankings for the upcoming July tournament in Nagoya are released. As in May there are two wrestlers making their debuts at sekiwake, Tochinoshin and Kaisei. This is the first time since 1943/44 that there have been two consecutive tournaments featuring two sekiwake debuts. Kitaharima makes his top division debut 85 tournaments after his professional debut, the ninth-slowest in history. Chiyonokuni returns to the top division for the first time in 13 tournaments, having at one point dropped to the rank of sandanme 28 – the second lowest rank that a wrestler making a successful makuuchi return has fallen since World War II. Toyohibiki, Kagayaki, Sadanofuji and Arawashi also return to the top division. Making their juryo debuts are Daiki and Shimanoumi (formerly Hamaguchi), while Onosho, Kyokutaisei and Kotoeko return.

=== July ===
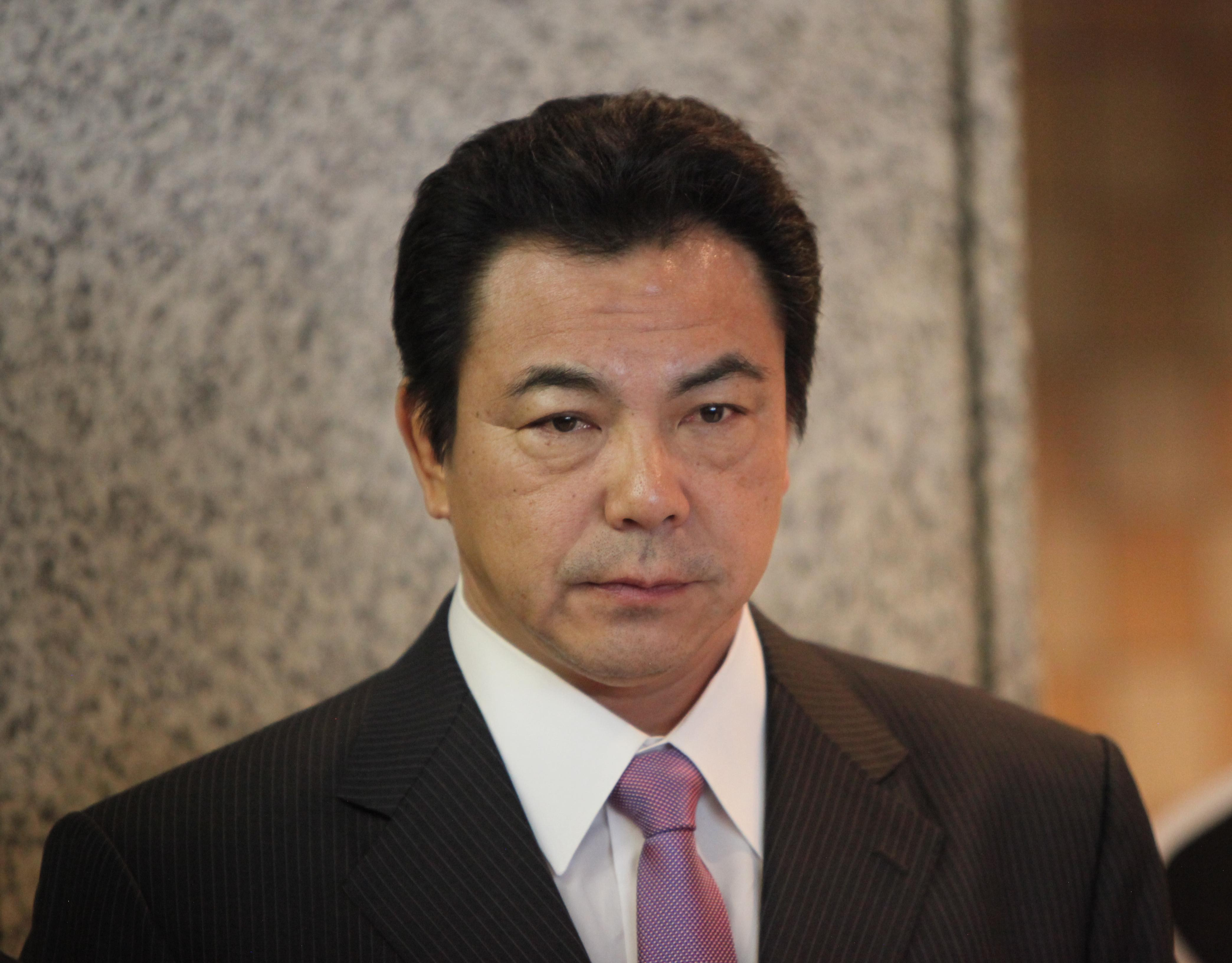
Chiyonofuji died in July

- 24: On the final day of the Nagoya tournament, Harumafuji wins his eighth career championship by defeating Hakuho (10–5) to finish on 13–2, avoiding the need for a playoff with maegashira Takanoiwa and yokozuna candidate Kisenosato, who are runners-up on 12–3. With 38 wins over the last three tournaments, Kisenosato will be in contention for promotion once again next time if he wins the championship. The Fighting Spirit Award is shared between Takanoiwa and Takarafuji, who scores 10–5 and also brought to an end Hakuho's winning streak on Day 5. Both are first time winners. Yoshikaze, who defeated Harumafuji, wins his second Outstanding Performance Prize. Takayasu wins his first Technique Award.
- 31: The 58th Yokozuna Chiyonofuji, Kokonoe Oyakata, dies of pancreatic cancer at the age of 61. He won 31 career championships, third on the all-time list behind Hakuho's 37 and Taiho's 32. 19 of his championships were won after the age of 30, and he also set records for longest post-war winning streak (53 bouts) and most career wins (1045).
- 31: The summer tour begins in Gifu.

=== August ===
- The summer tour visits the following locations:
  - 2: Fukui, Fukui Prefecture
  - 4: Tachikawa, Tokyo Prefecture
  - 5: Tamura, Fukushima Prefecture
  - 6: Tainai, Niigata Prefecture
  - 7: Joetsu, Niigata Prefecture
  - 8: Shirakawa, Fukushima Prefecture
  - 9: Iwaki, Fukushima Prefecture
  - 10: Fukushima, Fukushima Prefecture
  - 11: Sagae, Yamagata Prefecture
  - 12–13: Sendai, Miyagi Prefecture
  - 14: Morioka, Iwate Prefecture
  - 16: Akita, Akita Prefecture
  - 17: Hirakawa, Aomori Prefecture
  - 18: Osaki, Miyagi Prefecture
  - 19: Hakodate, Hokkaido Prefecture
  - 20: Tomakomai, Hokkaido Prefecture
  - 21: Sapporo, Hokkaido Prefecture
  - 25–26: Hiratsuka, Kanagawa Prefecture
  - 27: Higashimatsuyama, Saitama Prefecture
  - 28: KITTE Basho, Tokyo Prefecture
- 3: Former ozeki Chiyotaikai takes over as stablemaster of Kokonoe stable following the death of Chiyonofuji, changing his name from Sanoyama to Kokonoe Oyakata.
- 7: The funeral of Chiyonofuji is held at Kokonoe stable, with around 1000 guests attending.
- 26: Tokitenkū, who has been absent from the dohyo since November 2015 because of ongoing treatment for malignant lymphoma, announces his retirement. He is staying in sumo as a coach at Tokitsukaze stable, under the name Magaki Oyakata. After acquiring Japanese citizenship he had purchased the toshiyori or elder stock from former yokozuna Wakanohana Kanji II in May 2014, the first Mongolian born wrestler to do this (Kyokutenho had made arrangements with his stablemaster Oshima Oyakata to inherit the Oshima stock and so had no need to make a purchase.).
- 29: The banzuke for the September 2016 tournament is released. Both Goeido and Kotoshogiku are kadoban, or in danger of demotion from ozeki rank. There are two new sekiwake (Takayasu and Takarafuji) for the third straight tournament. Chiyoshoma and Amakaze make their top division debuts, while Homarefuji, Gagamaru, and Kyokushuho return. There are no juryo debuts, but Kizenryu and Wakanoshima return to the paid ranks. Makuuchi veterans Toyonoshima and Aminishiki drop to juryo through injury, as does Osunaarashi.

=== September ===
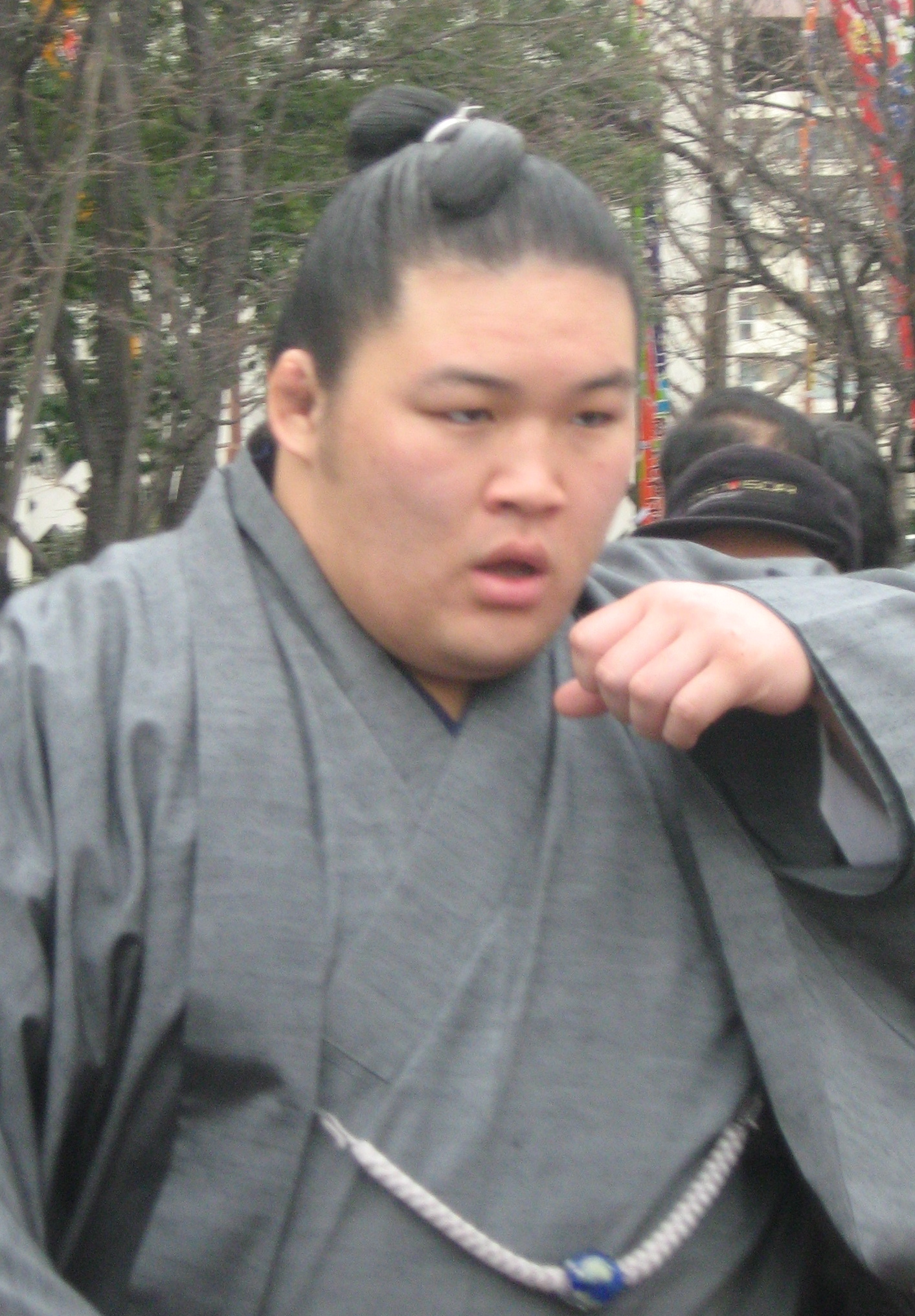
Goeido won his first top division championship in September with a perfect 15–0 record.

- 9: Hakuho announces that he will undergo surgery on the toe injury that hampered him from the ninth day of the Nagoya basho and led to his withdrawal from the forthcoming Aki tournament. He was carrying a number of other injuries that he aggravated on the summer tour – a damaged tendon, inflammation to his right ankle, and left knee joint derangement according to a medical certificate released by the Sumo Association.
- 25: Goeido, who clinched his first top division championship with victory over Tamawashi on the 14th day, defeats Kotoshogiku to finish with a perfect 15–0 record or zensho yusho. He is the first ozeki who was kadoban, or in danger of demotion, to take the yusho with an undefeated record and the first since Musashimaru in 1994 to claim his first championship 15–0. He is also the first Japanese wrestler in exactly 20 years to zensho-yusho, the last being Takanohana. Runner-up on 13–2 is Endo, who is awarded the Technique Prize. Okinoumi, who defeated both yokozuna and three ozeki, gets the Outstanding Performance Award, while Takayasu is rewarded for a 10–5 performance in his sekiwake debut with the Fighting Spirit Prize. In the juryo division, Daiki takes the yusho with a 12–3 record. Kizenryu will be demoted back to the makushita division after he can score only 5–10 at Juryo 11 – this is the fifth time out of five that he has lasted only one tournament in juryo, a record.
- 28: The wrestlers promoted to the juryo division for November are announced. There are three newcomers: Oyanagi of Tokitsukaze stable, Daishoho (Oitekaze) and Meisei (Tatsunami). Also, former maegashira Yamaguchi (who fell to sandanme) and former Juryo 12 Ryuden (who fell to jonokuchi) return.

=== October ===
- The autumn tour visits the following locations:
  - 5: Sosa, Chiba
  - 6: Chiba, Chiba
  - 7: Iruma, Saitama
  - 8: Saitama, Saitama
  - 9: Kofu, Yamanashi
  - 10: Tsuchiura, Ibaraki
  - 14: Toyohashi, Aichi
  - 15: Kanazawa, Ishikawa
  - 16: Osaka, Osaka
  - 18: Wakayama, Wakayama
  - 19: Yokkaichi, Mie
  - 20: Kyoto, Kyoto
  - 21: Kobe, Hyogo
  - 22: Kōchi, Kōchi
  - 23: Matsuyama, Ehime
  - 24: Tokushima, Tokushima
  - 25: Takamatsu, Kagawa
  - 26: Shobara, Hiroshima
  - 27: Izumo, Shimane
  - 28: Kurashiki, Okayama
  - 29: Hiroshima, Hiroshima
  - 30: Yamaguchi, Yamaguchi
- 31: The banzuke for the Kyushu tournament is released. Mitakeumi makes his sanyaku debut at komusubi. Hokutōfuji (formerly known as Daiki) and Ishiura make their makuuchi debuts, while Hidenoumi and Chiyotairyu return. Hokutofuji reached makuuchi ten tournaments after his professional debut, which is the equal second fastest rise since the six tournaments a year system was established in 1958. Former maegashira Yamaguchi returns to the juryo division after 15 tournaments having fallen to Sandanme 65, but he is outdone by Ryūden, who returns to juryo after 24 tournaments having fallen to Jonokuchi 17, the third lowest rank ever before a successful juryo return. Oyanagi, Meisei and the Mongolian Daishoho make their juryo debuts. Oyanagi is the first sandanme tsukedashi entrant to reach juryo.

=== November ===
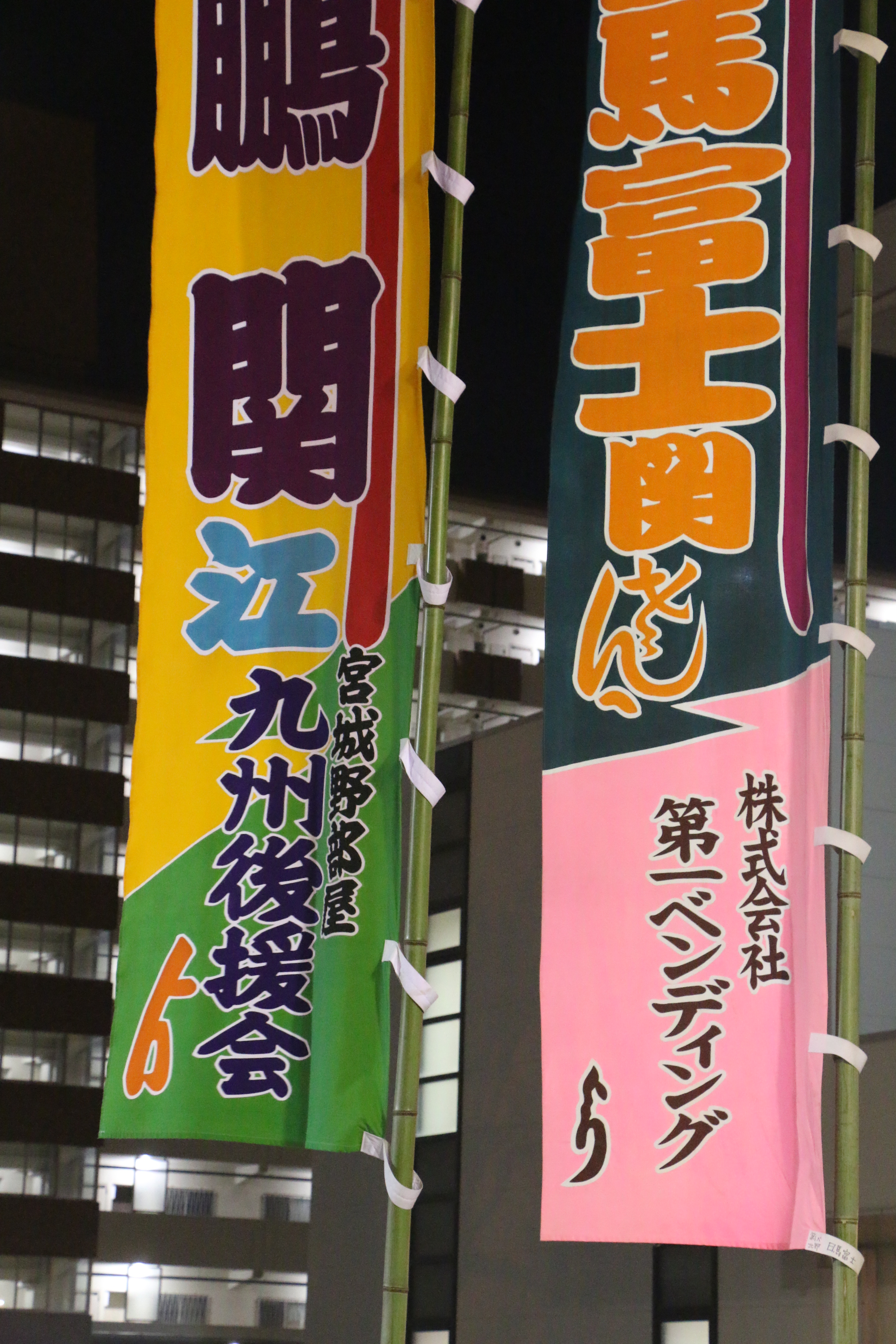
Banners announcing the Kyushu 2016 tournament

- 26:Kakuryu wins the Kyushu tournament, defeating ozeki Goeido to move to an unassailable two-win lead, having seen his closest rival Harumafuji lose to Hakuhō in the match immediately preceding his. He hands Goeido, who had been looking for yokozuna promotion at the start of the tournament, his fifth defeat.
- 27: Kakuryu defeats Harumafuji to finish with a 14–1 record. He wins his third Emperor's Cup, and second from the yokozuna rank. The runner-up is Kisenosato for the 12th time, which is a record for someone who has never won a yusho. Kisenosato also finishes with the highest number of wins for the calendar year with 69; no one else has achieved this without winning a tournament in the six basho a year era. Third place is shared by a number of wrestlers on 11–4, including Harumafuji, Hakuhō, and Shōdai, who shares the Fighting Spirit Prize with Ishiura. Isihiura had a ten bout winning streak on his top division debut, and finishes on 10–5. The Technique Award goes to Tamawashi; it is his first ever special prize after 44 top division tournaments. He also denies Endō, who had beaten a yokozuna and three ozeki, the Outstanding Performance Award by sending him to his eighth defeat. Goeido, the winner of the previous tournament, finishes on a mediocre 9–6 while Kotoshogiku will be kadoban in January after scoring only 5–10. The juryo division championship is won by Satō. In the sandanme division former komusubi Jōkōryū begins his comeback from injury by taking the championship with a perfect 7–0 record.

=== December ===
- The winter tour visits the following locations:
  - 4: Oita, Oita
  - 5: Nakatsu, Oita
  - 6: Nogata, Fukuoka
  - 7: Sasebo, Nagasaki
  - 8: Omuta, Fukuoka
  - 9: Amakusa, Kumamoto
  - 10: Kumamoto, Kumamoto
  - 11: Miyakonojo, Miyazaki
  - 13: Saga, Saga
  - 15: Amami, Kagoshima
  - 17–18: Ginowan, Okinawa
  - 20–21: Miyakojima, Okinawa
- 26: The banzuke for the Hatsu tournament in Tokyo next year is released. There is a newcomer to the juryo division, Terutsuyoshi, who is attracting attention because he was born on the same day as the Kobe earthquake – January 17, 1995. He becomes the sixth current sekitori from Isegahama stable. There are two wrestlers making their sekiwake debuts – Tamawashi, who took 77 career tournaments to make the rank, and Shodai, who took just 17, the second quickest after Konishiki. There are also two wrestlers making their top division debuts – Takakeishō, formerly known as Sato, and Chiyoō.

== Deaths ==
- 10 March: Former maegashira 2 Kotowaka, aged 61, of gallbladder cancer.

== See also ==
- Glossary of sumo terms
- List of active sumo wrestlers
- List of years in sumo
