= Myōgiryū Yasunari =

Japanese sumo wrestler

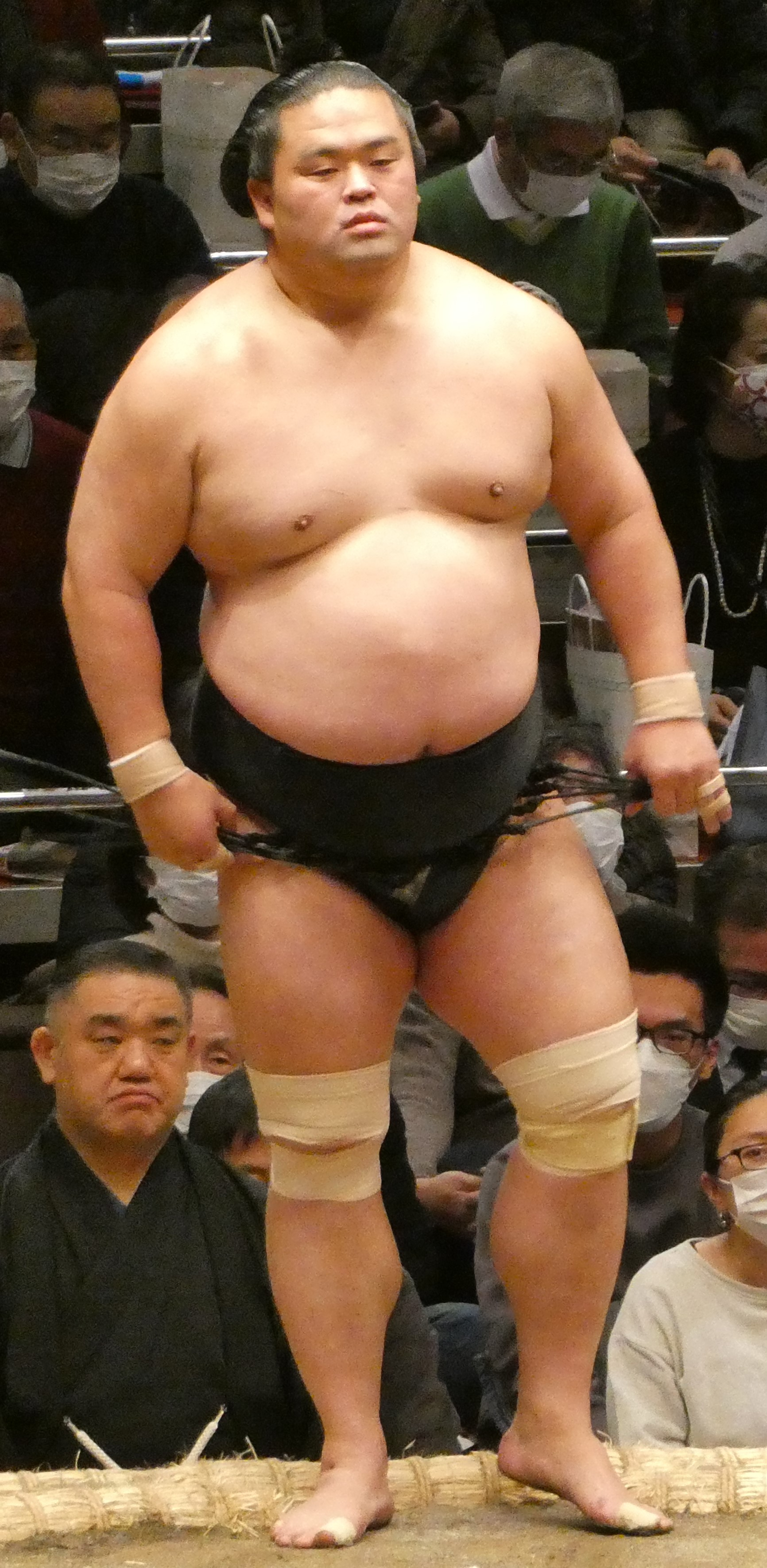
- Myōgiryū in 2022

Personal information
- Native name: 妙義龍 泰成
- Born: Yasunari Miyamoto; 22 October 1986 (age 39) Takasago, Hyōgo, Japan
- Height: 1.88 m (6 ft 2 in)
- Weight: 153 kg (337 lb; 24.1 st)

Sport
- Sport: Sumo
- University team: Nippon Sport Science University
- Retired: September 2024
- Heya: Sakaigawa
- Record: 601-597-79
- Debut: May 2009
- Highest rank: Sekiwake (Sept 2012)
- Elder name: Furiwake
- Championships: 3 (Jūryō); 1 (Makushita)
- Special Prizes: Technique (6)
- Gold Stars: 6 Hakuhō (2), Harumafuji, Kisenosato, Kakuryū (2)

Myōgiryū Yasunari (Japanese: 妙義龍 泰成; born 22 October 1986 as Yasunari Miyamoto (宮本 泰成, Miyamoto Yasunari)) is a Japanese former professional sumo wrestler from Takasago, Hyōgo. Making his debut in May 2009 as a makushita tsukedashi out of university, he reached the top division for the first time in November 2011. His highest rank to date has been sekiwake. He has earned six special prizes for Technique and six kinboshi for defeating yokozuna. He was runner-up in the September 2021 tournament.

Myōgiryū is popular with female sumo fans, some of whom call out his nickname "22" at tournaments, apparently a reference to his body fat percentage, which is one of the lowest in sumo and has even been mentioned in commercials. Due to his longevity in sumo's top division and popularity with the female audience, Myōgiryū is also nicknamed "otoko" (漢, lit. 'the man').

Myōgiryū has coached at Sakaigawa stable since his retirement from competition in September 2024. His elder name is Furiwake.

== Early life and sumo background ==
Miyamoto was a member of an area sumo club in elementary school and in junior high school he participated in a national athletic meet as a sumo participant. He transferred to Saitama Sakae High School in Saitama prefecture, and in 2004 participated in a sumo event along with his schoolmate, the future Gōeidō, and in group competition came in second place to Gōeidō's first. In 2008, as a fourth year university student at Nippon Sport Science University, he won a national sumo tournament in Ōita prefecture, and qualified to enter professional sumo as a makushita tsukedashi. He received invitations from several sumo stables, and eventually chose Sakaigawa stable which Gōeidō had previously joined.

== Career ==
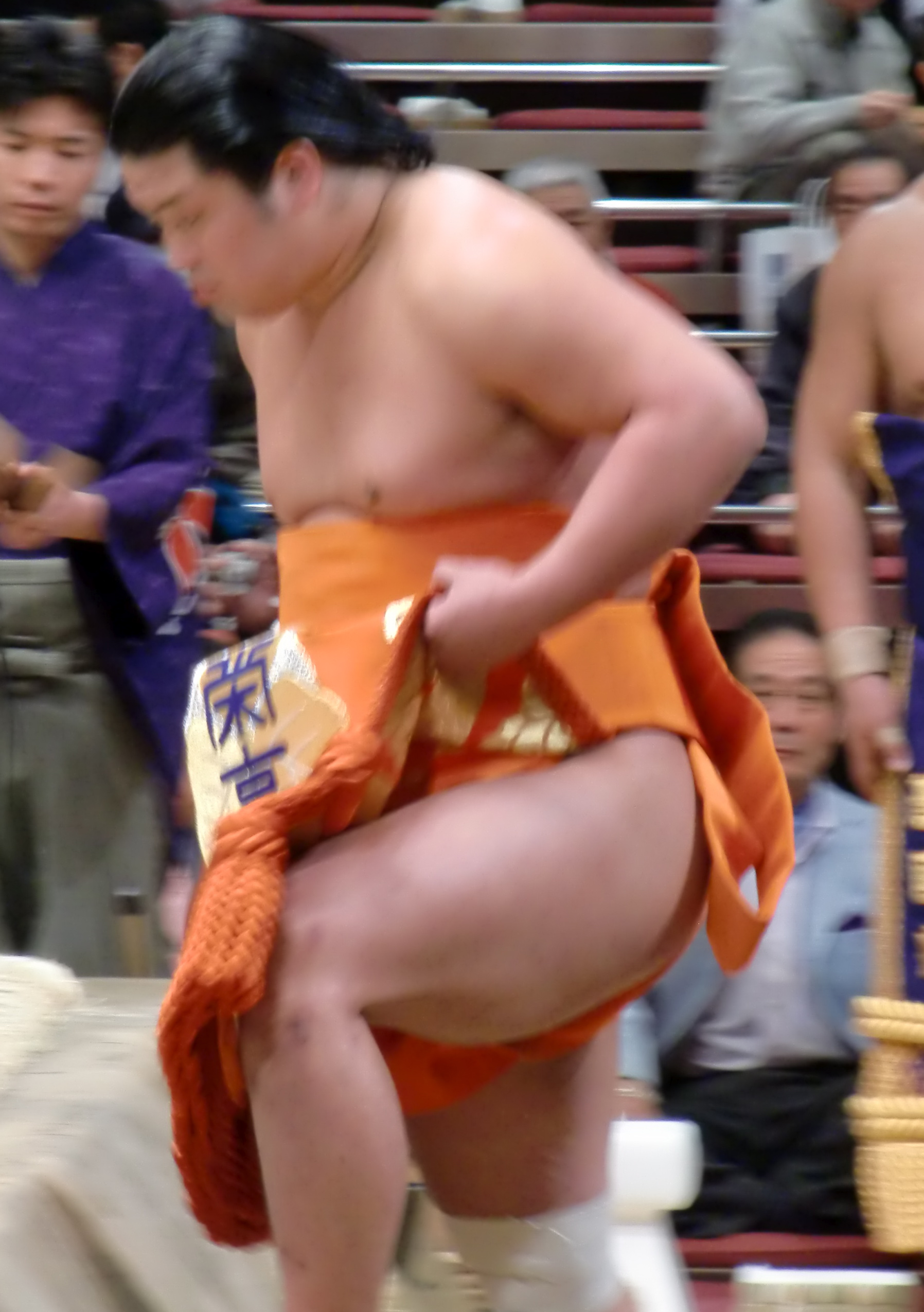
Myōgiryū at his first tournament as a sekitori in January 2010

His first tournament was in May, 2009. His debut at makushita 15 was the highest since Daishoumi in March, 2007. He was reported to have been gunning for equaling Shimoda's makushita tsukedashi debut 7–0 championship, but soon ran into trouble, losing his very first match. He was apparently taken aback at the size of wrestlers in professional sumo and their tendency to not touch both fists to the ring before the initial charge. He eventually found his bearings and pulled out a 5–2 winning tournament. He would follow this with three more consecutive 5–2 tournaments, which would carry him straight into jūryō for the January 2010 tournament. On promotion to jūryō he changed his ring name to Myōgiryū, meaning "dragon of many skills" a name suggested by a former teacher at his university.

Myōgiryū convincingly beat Jūmonji in his first jūryō match but on only the second day, severely injured his left knee in a bout against Gagamaru and dropped out of the tournament. He was forced to sit out the next three tournaments due to his injury and his rank had dropped to bottom ranks of sandanme, a division he had never fought in before, by the time he returned in the September 2010 tournament. He lost no time though, achieving a perfect 7–0 record in his post injury debut and narrowly losing the sandanme championship in a playoff loss to his upperclassman from his former university, Chiyozakura. In the following tournament, on his re-promotion to makushita he would top this feat, posting 6 straight wins after losing his first bout, and going on to take the championship winning out in a six-way playoff. After two more convincing kachi-koshi tournaments in makushita he was back in jūryō, the division in which he had only fought two bouts. Undeterred by his first brush with bad luck at this level, he posted an 11–4 record and beat Masunoyama in a playoff for the championship.

In his second full tournament at jūryō Myōgiryū racked up an even more convincing 13–2 record and a consecutive championship. This would secure his entry into the top division in the 2011 November tournament. Coincidentally, he entered in the same tournament as senior wrestler Tsurugidake who 8 years before had entered sumo under the same ring name of Miyamoto, the surname they share.

Myōgiryū managed a winning record of 10–5 and advanced in makuuchi to maegashira 5 for the January 2012 tournament. He produced another strong performance there, scoring 9–6 and winning his first sanshō or special prize, for Technique. He won his second Technique Award in the May tournament. In the following July tournament he made his san'yaku debut at the rank of komusubi, and came through with a winning record and his third Technique Award. He was promoted to sekiwake for the September tournament, the second from his stable to reach sumo's third highest rank after Gōeidō. He won ten bouts and his fourth Technique Prize in the last five tournaments.

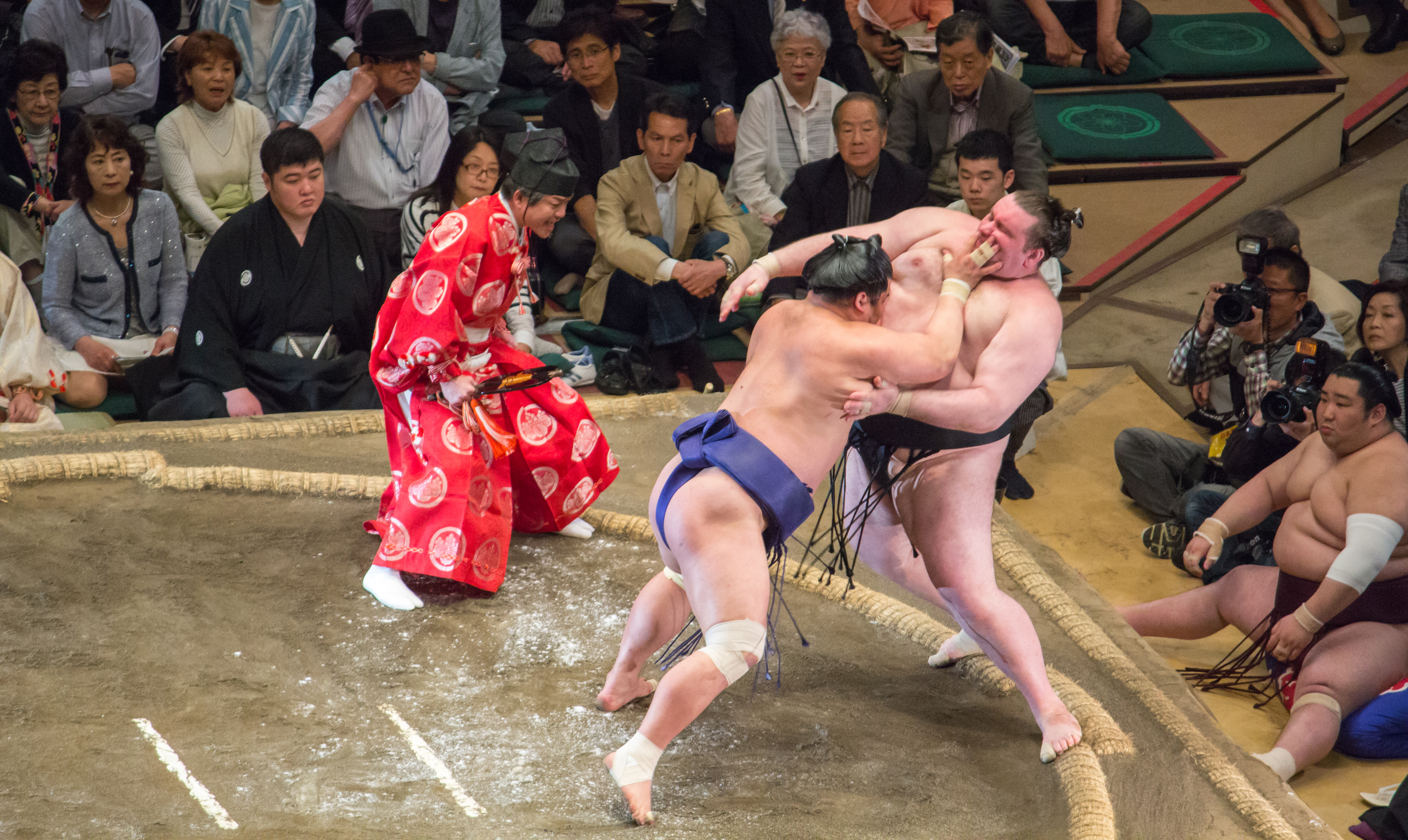
Myōgiryū against Gagamaru in the May 2014 tournament

After a losing record in November Myōgiryū was ranked at maegashira 1 for the January 2013 tournament. He earned his first kinboshi for a yokozuna upset by defeating Hakuhō on Day 3, but missed out on a special prize as he could only finish with a losing record of 7–8. In May he defeated another yokozuna, Harumafuji, and two ōzeki, and was rewarded with his fifth Technique prize for the tournament after a strong 11–4 score. His success continued, with two sekiwake appearances in the following July and September tournaments. He would fall back to maegashira 1 in November 2013, but a winning tournament would put him back in san'yaku at komusubi for the January 2014 tournament. He lost his first four bouts in this tournament and dropped out due to injury. This would drop him to maegashira 10 in March, but two consecutive 8–7 winning tournaments would put him back in upper makuuchi for the July 2014 tournament. He scored 11–4 there, which returned him to sekiwake for September, but he had to miss the whole of that tournament through injury and dropped back to the maegashira ranks. Nine wins in November and nine more in January 2015 saw him back at komusubi for the March tournament where eight wins were sufficient to gain promotion to sekiwake again. He dropped back to komusubi for July, but was promoted to sekiwake for the fourth time for the September tournament. He lost his sekiwake rank in November 2015 after a poor 2–13 record, and spent 2016 in the maegashira ranks. His run of 34 consecutive tournaments ranked in the top division ended after the May 2017 tournament when he was demoted to the jūryō division.

After spending two tournaments in jūryō he returned to makuuchi after the November 2017 tournament. He stood at 6–3 after nine days but then lost four bouts in a row and withdrew on Day 14 due to a left knee injury, which meant a make-koshi score and demotion back to jūryō for January 2018. He won the jūryō division championship for the third time in this tournament, defeating Hidenoumi in a playoff and ensuring another return to makuuchi.

After three consecutive winning records from May to September 2018, Myōgiryū was promoted to maegashira 1 for the November tournament. On Day 2 he defeated yokozuna Kisenosato for only the fourth time in 20 meetings to earn his third career kinboshi and his first since 2013. He was promoted to komusubi in January 2019, the first time he had been ranked in san'yaku since November 2015, but fell short with a 5–10 record. In May 2019 he earned his fourth kinboshi with a defeat of Kakuryū. In January 2020 he defeated Hakuhō and Kakuryū on consecutive days, but finished with a 5–10 record.

In September 2021 he was runner-up in a top division tournament for the first time, finishing on 11-4, two wins behind new yokozuna Terunofuji. He was still in contention for the championship on the final day but lost his last match to Meisei. During this tournament he also defeated ōzeki Takakeishō for the first time. He was awarded his sixth Technique prize, his first in eight years.

During the 12th day of the July 2023 tournament, Myōgiryū celebrated his 1100th match since his professional debut with a victory over maegashira Takarafuji. When asked at the end of 2023 about how long his career would last, he confided that he did not think he would continue to fight until he was forty, but that he would fight until he was no longer satisfied with his performances.

=== Retirement ===
During the March 2024 tournament, Myōgiryū recorded a poor performance while in a relegation position in the jūryō division. He lost his makuuchi status for the following tournament in May, where his performance did not improve, although he did not mention any injuries or a lack of willpower. Myōgiryū completely withdrew from the September 2024 tournament due to left knee pain after which, with demotion out of sekitori status appearing certain, he retired from professional competition.

At his retirement press conference on 26 September 2024, Myōgiryū said that he was able to compete in sumo to the end so that he would have no regrets. He added that, despite his injuries, he was able to fight energetically and that he never thought he would be able to continue as an active wrestler until the age of 37. When asked about his most memorable bout in sumo, Myōgiryū replied that it was his win over yokozuna Hakuhō in January 2013, which earned him the first of his six gold stars. He remains as a coach in the Sumo Association under the elder name Furiwake.

Myōgiryū's retirement ceremony was held on 5 October 2025 at the Ryōgoku Kokugikan, with about 400 individuals taking part in the ceremonial cutting of the top-knot.

== Fighting style ==
Myōgiryū is a pusher thruster who preferred oshi-sumo techniques. His most common winning kimarite was yorikiri, which accounted for 35% of his career victories. In his university days he was known for his ability to drop his hips low and move forward quickly, although his was diminished by the serious knee injury he suffered in his jūryō debut. In his fourteenth professional year, Myōgiryū spoke to Yahoo! Sports about his longevity, mentioning above all that his key to longevity was his diet and the supplements he takes to build muscle mass.

== Personal life ==
Myōgiryū announced in September 2017 that he registered his marriage to Kana, an old classmate from Saitama Sakae High School, in June. Their first son, Yasukichi, was born in the same month. The wedding ceremony was held in June 2018. They have another son, Kenkichi, and a daughter, Oto.

== Career record ==
Myōgiryū Yasunari
Year	January Hatsu basho, Tokyo	March Haru basho, Osaka	May Natsu basho, Tokyo	July Nagoya basho, Nagoya	September Aki basho, Tokyo	November Kyūshū basho, Fukuoka
2009	x	x	Makushita tsukedashi #15; 5–2	West Makushita #7; 5–2	West Makushita #2; 5–2	West Makushita #1; 5–2
2010	East Jūryō #14; 1–2–12	East Makushita #14; Sat out due to injury 0–0–7	West Makushita #54; Sat out due to injury 0–0–7	West Sandanme #34; Sat out due to injury 0–0–7	West Sandanme #94; 7–0–P	East Makushita #58; 6–1–PPP; Champion
2011	West Makushita #26; 6–1	East Makushita #8; Tournament Cancelled; Match fixing investigation 0–0–0	East Makushita #8; 4–3	West Jūryō #12; 11–4–P; Champion	East Jūryō #3; 13–2; Champion	West Maegashira #11; 10–5
2012	East Maegashira #5; 9–6; T	East Maegashira #1; 7–8	East Maegashira #2; 9–6; T	East Komusubi #1; 8–7; T	East Sekiwake #1; 10–5; T	East Sekiwake #1; 6–9
2013	West Maegashira #1; 7–8 ★	West Maegashira #2; 8–7	East Maegashira #1; 11–4; T★	East Sekiwake #1; 8–7	East Sekiwake #1; 6–9	East Maegashira #1; 8–7
2014	East Komusubi #1; 0–4–11	East Maegashira #10; 8–7	East Maegashira #8; 8–7	West Maegashira #6; 11–4	East Sekiwake #1; Sat out due to injury 0–0–15	East Maegashira #11; 9–6
2015	East Maegashira #8; 9–6	West Komusubi #1; 8–7	West Sekiwake #1; 7–8	West Komusubi #1; 8–7	West Sekiwake #1; 8–7	West Sekiwake #1; 2–13
2016	East Maegashira #8; 8–7	East Maegashira #6; 10–5	East Maegashira #1; 6–9	West Maegashira #3; 7–8	East Maegashira #4; 5–10	East Maegashira #9; 8–7
2017	East Maegashira #7; 4–11	East Maegashira #14; 6–9	East Maegashira #15; 4–11	East Jūryō #4; 10–5	West Jūryō #1; 8–7	West Maegashira #15; 6–8–1
2018	East Jūryō #1; 10–5–P; Champion	West Maegashira #15; 6–9	East Maegashira #16; 10–5	East Maegashira #9; 9–6	East Maegashira #5; 8–7	East Maegashira #1; 8–7 ★
2019	East Komusubi #1; 5–10	West Maegashira #2; 6–9	East Maegashira #5; 6–9 ★	East Maegashira #7; 8–7	West Maegashira #6; 8–5–2	East Maegashira #2; 8–7
2020	West Maegashira #1; 5–10 ★★	East Maegashira #6; 4–11	West Maegashira #10; Tournament Cancelled; State of Emergency; 0–0–0	West Maegashira #10; 10–5	East Maegashira #3; 6–9	East Maegashira #5; 4–11
2021	West Maegashira #9; 8–7	West Maegashira #4; 7–8	West Maegashira #4; 6–9	East Maegashira #7; 5–10	West Maegashira #10; 11–4; T	West Maegashira #3; 2–13
2022	East Maegashira #10; 5–8–2	East Maegashira #11; 7–8	East Maegashira #12; 6–9	East Maegashira #14; 9–6	East Maegashira #9; 8–7	West Maegashira #7; 8–7
2023	West Maegashira #6; 6–9	East Maegashira #10; 5–10	West Maegashira #14; 9–6	West Maegashira #10; 6–9	East Maegashira #13; 10–5	East Maegashira #9; 6–9
2024	West Maegashira #12; 5–10	East Maegashira #15; 6–9	West Jūryō #1; 3–12	West Jūryō #8; 7–8	West Jūryō #9; Retired; 0–0–15	x
Record given as wins–losses–absences Top division champion Top division runner-up Retired Lower divisions Non-participation Sanshō key: F=Fighting spirit; O=Outstanding performance; T=Technique Also shown: ★=Kinboshi; P=Playoff(s); Divisions: Makuuchi — Jūryō — Makushita — Sandanme — Jonidan — Jonokuchi Makuuchi ranks: Yokozuna — Ōzeki — Sekiwake — Komusubi — Maegashira

== See also ==
- List of sumo tournament top division runners-up
- List of sumo tournament second division champions
- List of active gold star earners
- Glossary of sumo terms
- List of active sumo wrestlers
- List of sekiwake
- Active special prize winners
