= Tomoharu =

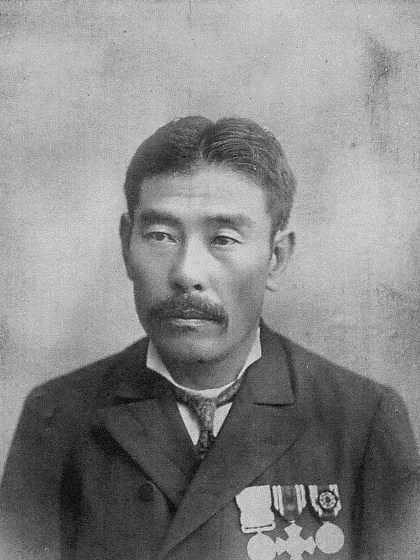
- Tomoharu Tachibana (1857-1929), Japanese agricultural leader and politician
- Pronunciation: tomohaɾɯ (IPA)
- Gender: Male

Origin
- Origin: Japanese
- Meaning: Different meanings depending on the kanji used

Tomoharu is a masculine Japanese given name.

== Written forms ==
Tomoharu can be written using different combinations of kanji characters. Some examples:

- 友治, "friend, manage/cure"
- 友春, "friend, spring"
- 友温, "friend, warm up"
- 友晴, "friend, clear (weather)"
- 知治, "know, manage/cure"
- 知春, "know, spring"
- 知温, "know, warm up"
- 知晴, "know, clear (weather)"
- 智治, "intellect, manage/cure"
- 智春, "intellect, spring"
- 智温, "intellect, warm up"
- 智晴, "intellect, clear (weather)"
- 共治, "together, manage/cure"
- 共晴, "together, clear (weather)"
- 朋英, "companion, manage/cure"
- 朋晴, "companion, clear (weather)"
- 朝治, "morning/dynasty, manage/cure"
- 朝春, "morning/dynasty, spring"
- 朝温, "morning/dynasty, warm up"
- 朝晴, "morning/dynasty, clear (weather)"

The name can also be written in hiragana ともはる or katakana トモハル.

== Notable people with the name ==
- Tomoharu Katsumata (勝間田 具治; born 1938), Japanese anime director
- Tomoharu Saitou (齋藤 友晴; born 1983), Japanese Magic: The Gathering player
- Tomoharu Masunoyama (舛ノ山 大晴; born 1990), real name Tomoharu Kato (加藤 大晴), Japanese sumo wrestler
- Tomoharu Tachibana (立花 寛治; 1857-1929), Japanese agricultural leader and politician
- Tomoharu Takeo (竹尾 智晴; born 1951), Japanese actor and singer known by his stage name Ryūsei Nakao

== Fictional characters ==
- Tomoharu Natsume (夏目 智春), from Asura Cryin'
