= Takanoiwa Yoshimori =

Sumo wrestler from Mongolia

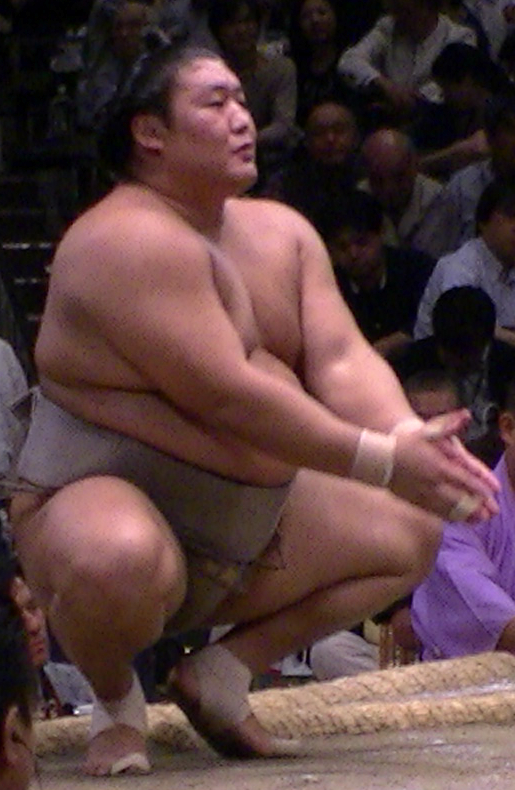

Personal information
- Native name: 貴ノ岩 義司
- Born: Adiyagiin Baasandorj Адъяагийн Баасандорж; 26 February 1990 (age 36) Ulaanbaatar, Mongolia
- Height: 1.82 m (5 ft 11 1/2 in)
- Weight: 150 kg (330 lb)

Sport
- Sport: Sumo
- Retired: December, 2018
- Heya: Takanohana → Tokiwayama
- Record: 371–303–44
- Debut: January 2009
- Highest rank: Maegashira 2 (Mar 2017)
- Championships: 2 (Jūryō); 1 (Sandanme)
- Special Prizes: Fighting spirit (1); Outstanding Performance (1)
- Gold Stars: 1 (Hakuho)
- Updated on Feb 2, 2019

Takanoiwa Yoshimori (born 26 February 1990 as Adiyagiin Baasandorj) is a former sumo wrestler from Ulaanbaatar, Mongolia. He made his professional debut in January 2009. He has both a sandanme and a jūryō division championship. He reached the jūryō division in July 2012 and the top makuuchi division for the first time in January 2014. He was the only wrestler recruited by former yokozuna Takanohana to reach the elite sekitori ranks. He was runner-up in one top division tournament and earned two special prizes, one for Fighting Spirit and one for Outstanding Performance. His highest rank was maegashira 2.

Takanoiwa was the victim of an assault by sumo wrestler Harumafuji in October 2017. Takanoiwa was then the assailant in an incident against a junior member of his own stable the following year, which led to his retirement from the sport.

== Early life and sumo background ==
Baasandorj passed a selective test administered by a Japanese coach from Tottori Jōhoku High School in Shimane Prefecture, who had come to Mongolia looking for sumo prospects. He was then invited to come to Japan as an exchange student on a sumo program at the age of sixteen. Only three months after coming to Japan, his father died of liver disease in Mongolia. He had already lost his mother to heart disease when he was eight years old. Through this adversity, he still managed to excel, and in 2007 made the best four in the individual category at a national junior sumo competition and in 2008 finished second in the middle-weight category at the World Junior Sumo Championships held in Chiang Mai, Thailand.

== Career ==
In November 2008 he joined Takanohana stable, run by former yokozuna Takanohana who he had idolized since a young age. The ring name he would choose is purported to have come from a chance meeting with singer and author Akihiro Miwa in Haneda airport, as he was being accompanied by Takanohana from Shimane Prefecture to his new stable. Upon meeting him, Miwa described him a "like a rock" (岩 iwa). This left an impression on him and that very evening he consulted with his stablemaster and together they conceived of the ring name of Takanoiwa (noble rock), the taka (貴) coming from his stablemaster's ring name (as is the custom at the stable).

His debut was delayed one tournament while his visa was procured, and he debuted in maezumō in the January 2009 tournament along with fellow recruits Takageppō and Takatoshi. Proceeding him were graduates from Johoku High School (well known for its strong sumo program) Takarafuji, Kimikaze and Tokushōryū. His official debut was in the following March 2009 tournament where he managed a strong 5–2 record in the jonokuchi division. In the May 2009 tournament in the jonidan division, he would vie for the championship, logging a perfect 7–0 record and only losing on the final day in a play-off. After two winning tournaments in the sandanme division, in the November 2009 he took the championship in that division with a 7–0 record and playoff win. This allowed him promotion to the makushita third division, but he struggled in this division for an over a year, rarely achieving a winning tournament and in the midway through the May 2011 tournament he dropped out and also missed the following tournament. He was relegated back to sandanme but was not deterred and posted a 6–1 record his first tournament back which allowed him to be promoted back to makushita the very next tournament where he achieved a 6–1 record and participated in a three-man playoff for the championship, losing the second playoff match to future sekitori Chiyoōtori. His fortunes continued to improve and after four winning tournaments at makushita he was promoted to the salaried ranks of jūryō for the first time for the July 2012 tournament. After recording a winning 8–7 record, he had managed only two 7–8 tournaments after this. However, at the rank of jūryō 13, a rank low enough to face possible relegation if he did not perform well, he turned his fortunes around and took the championship in jūryō with a 12–3 record. After another five tournaments, achieving mostly winning records in jūryō he was finally promoted to the top tier makuuchi division for the January 2014 tournament.

Over the next two years Takanoiwa moved back and forth between the top two divisions. He was relegated after the May tournament but returned immediately after recording twelve wins in July. After two losing records he dropped back to jūryō but was promoted again after the March 2015 tournament. He again lasted only two tournaments before being relegated but was promoted for the fourth time after a kachi-koshi or winning record in November 2015. In January and March 2016 he achieved back-to-back winning records for the first time in the top division. In July he had his best performance to date in the top division, scoring 12–3 and finishing runner-up to Harumafuji. He was awarded his first special prize, for Fighting Spirit, and won promotion to his highest rank to date of maegashira 3 for the September 2016 tournament.

Losing records in the last two tournaments of 2016 saw him drop to maegashira 10 but he returned to form in January 2017. After compiling a 10–3 record he earned his first kinboshi on day 14 with force out (yorikiri) win over Hakuhō. Despite losing to Sokokurai on the final day he finished in a tie for third place and was awarded the special prize for Outstanding Performance. He was promoted to his highest rank to date of maegashira 2 for the Haru tournament in March. He withdrew from the May 2017 tournament on the 12th day due to a thigh injury.

=== Assault ===
He was injured during the Tottori stage of the regional tour in October 2017, and was hospitalized from November 5 to November 9 in Fukuoka, reportedly with concussion and a fractured skull among other ailments. He withdrew from the November 2017 tournament as a result. On November 14 it was reported that he had been assaulted with a beer bottle (later said to be a karaoke remote control) by yokozuna Harumafuji. Harumafuji withdrew from the November tournament on the same day and did not deny the reports, saying "I sincerely apologize for causing trouble." It later emerged that Takanoiwa's injuries were not as severe as first reported, with a doctor at the Fukuoka hospital who wrote the initial medical certificate submitted to the Japan Sumo Association by stablemaster Takanohana saying that there were no symptoms of skull fracture or brain fluid leakage, and that the "two weeks of recovery time" mentioned in the certificate should have started from the date of the incident in late October, not when the certificate was issued on November 9, meaning that Takanoiwa was cleared to enter the tournament. Takanoiwa was questioned by Tottori prefectural police as part of their enquiry into the incident, which is alleged to have been sparked off by Takanoiwa disrespecting yokozuna Hakuhō by telling him that "your era is over" and playing with his cell phone while he was being reprimanded for his bad attitude.

He did not take part in the regional tour in December, despite his stablemaster not submitting a new medical certificate. He finally spoke to the Sumo Association's crisis committee investigating the affair on December 19, and said that he had not done anything discourteous that would warrant being struck by Harumafuji. He also said that he was embarrassed about being hit in front of officials from Tottori Jōhoku High School, which Takanoiwa attended and whose graduates were being celebrated when the incident occurred. He added that he had not wanted Harumafuji to retire. He fell to the jūryō division for the January 2018 tournament, but Hakkaku Oyakata, chairman of the Sumo Association, said Takanoiwa would not be demoted further if he provided a medical certificate and would still be ranked in jūryō for March 2018 even were he to be absent from the January tournament. Takaniowa officially withdrew from the tournament on January 12.

Takanoiwa made his first public appearance since the scandal at a training event on March 1, where he said he was gradually returning to fitness. He entered the March 2018 tournament and earned an 8–7 record in the jūryō division. He won the jūryō division championship in July 2018 with a 13–2 record and a playoff win over Takanosho to ensure his return to the top division after a year's absence.

On October 4, 2018 Takanoiwa filed a lawsuit in Tokyo District Court seeking 24 million yen in damages from Harumafuji, after negotiations over an informal settlement broke down. He withdrew the suit on October 30, saying his family had suffered abuse over the legal action because of Harumafuji's continued popularity in Mongolia.

=== Return to Makuuchi ===
In his first tournament back in the top division Takanoiwa scored ten wins and five losses. After this tournament his stablemaster Takanohana resigned from the Sumo Association and Takanoiwa moved with his fellow Takanohana stable wrestlers to the Chiganoura stable. In his first (and only) tournament for his new stable in November 2018, he scored 6–9.

=== Retirement ===
On 5 December 2018 the Japan Sumo Association announced that Takanoiwa had assaulted one of his personal attendants, or tsukebito, during a regional tour, giving him a swollen face. Two days after this announcement, the Sumo Association accepted Takanoiwa's resignation from the sport. At a press conference, Takanoiwa said that he caused "anguish" and that he would take responsibility for the incident by retiring. He had a danpatsu-shiki or retirement ceremony at the Ryōgoku Kokugikan on February 2, 2019, although it was not an official Sumo Association event. Hakuhō, Kakuryū and Harumafuji attended, although Takanohana did not.

== Fighting style ==
Takanoiwa was a yotsu-sumo wrestler who preferred grappling techniques to pushing and thrusting. His favoured grip on his opponent's mawashi or belt was migi-yotsu, a left hand outside, right hand inside position. He regularly used his left hand outer grip to win by uwatenage, or overarm throw, but his most common winning kimarite was a straightforward yori-kiri, or force out.

== Career record ==
Takanoiwa Yoshimori
Year	January Hatsu basho, Tokyo	March Haru basho, Osaka	May Natsu basho, Tokyo	July Nagoya basho, Nagoya	September Aki basho, Tokyo	November Kyūshū basho, Fukuoka
2009	(Maezumo)	West Jonokuchi #26; 5–2	East Jonidan #92; 7–0–P	East Sandanme #85; 6–1	West Sandanme #27; 4–3	West Sandanme #14; 7–0–P; Champion
2010	West Makushita #13; 3–4	East Makushita #19; 3–4	East Makushita #26; 2–5	East Makushita #45; 6–1	East Makushita #19; 3–4	West Makushita #24; 4–3
2011	East Makushita #21; 3–4	Tournament Cancelled; 0–0–0	West Makushita #30; 1–2–4	West Makushita #44; Sat out due to injury 0–0–7	West Sandanme #22; 6–1	East Makushita #42; 6–1–PP
2012	East Makushita #17; 5–2	West Makushita #6; 5–2	West Makushita #1; 4–3	East Jūryō #14; 8–7	East Jūryō #10; 7–8	East Jūryō #12; 7–8
2013	East Jūryō #13; 12–3; Champion	West Jūryō #4; 8–7	East Jūryō #2; 8–7	East Jūryō #1; 7–8	East Jūryō #2; 8–7	West Jūryō #1; 8–7
2014	West Maegashira #15; 7–8	West Maegashira #15; 10–5	East Maegashira #12; 3–12	East Jūryō #3; 12–3	West Maegashira #11; 7–8	East Maegashira #13; 3–12
2015	West Jūryō #4; 6–9	West Jūryō #6; 11–4	East Maegashira #16; 7–8	East Maegashira #16; 6–9	West Jūryō #2; 9–6	East Jūryō #1; 8–7
2016	West Maegashira #13; 9–6	East Maegashira #8; 8–7	East Maegashira #6; 5–10	East Maegashira #10; 12–3; F	East Maegashira #3; 5–10	West Maegashira #7; 6–9
2017	East Maegashira #10; 11–4; O★	West Maegashira #2; 6–9	East Maegashira #5; 5–7–3	East Maegashira #7; 6–9	East Maegashira #9; 8–7	East Maegashira #8; Sat out due to injury 0–0–15
2018	East Jūryō #3; Sat out due to injury 0–0–15	West Jūryō #12; 8–7	West Jūryō #11; 11–4	West Jūryō #3; 13–2–P; Champion	West Maegashira #13; 10–5	East Maegashira #6; 6–9
2019	East Maegashira #9; Retired –	x	x	x	x	x
Record given as wins–losses–absences Top division champion Top division runner-up Retired Lower divisions Non-participation Sanshō key: F=Fighting spirit; O=Outstanding performance; T=Technique Also shown: ★=Kinboshi; P=Playoff(s); Divisions: Makuuchi — Jūryō — Makushita — Sandanme — Jonidan — Jonokuchi Makuuchi ranks: Yokozuna — Ōzeki — Sekiwake — Komusubi — Maegashira

== See also ==
- Glossary of sumo terms
- List of past sumo wrestlers
- List of Mongolian sumo wrestlers
- List of non-Japanese sumo wrestlers
- List of sumo top division runners-up
- List of sumo second division champions
