= 2014 in sumo =

2014 in sumo saw the traditional six major tournaments or basho held in January, March, May, July, September and November as usual. The yokozuna Hakuhō won five of the six tournaments taking his total of yūshō to 32 to equal the record of Taihō. Kakuryū's victory in March saw him promoted to become the sport's 71st yokozuna. Consistent performances at the rank of sekiwake saw Gōeidō being promoted to ōzeki for the September tournament. The most notable retirement was that of the former ōzeki Kotoōshū.

== Tournaments ==
=== Hatsu basho ===
Ryōgoku Kokugikan, Tokyo, 12 January – 26 January

2014 Hatsu basho results - Makuuchi Division
W		L		A	East			Rank	West			W		L		A
0	-	0	-	15	ø	(Mongolia)	Harumafuji	Y		(Mongolia)	**Hakuhō***	14	-	1	-	0
7	-	8	-	0		(Japan)	Kisenosato	O		(Mongolia)	**Kakuryū**	14	-	1	-	0
9	-	6	-	0		(Japan)	**Kotoshōgiku**	O	ø							
8	-	7	-	0		(Japan)	Gōeidō	S		(Bulgaria)	**Kotoōshū**	8	-	7	-	0
0	-	4	-	11	ø	(Japan)	Myōgiryū	K		(Japan)	**Tochiōzan**	11	-	4	-	0
8	-	7	-	0		(Japan)	**Toyonoshima**	M1		(Japan)	Okinoumi	7	-	8	-	0
4	-	11	-	0		(Japan)	Chiyotairyū	M2		(Japan)	Ikioi	6	-	9	-	0
6	-	9	-	0		(Bulgaria)	Aoiyama	M3		(Japan)	Toyohibiki	5	-	10	-	0
6	-	9	-	0		(Japan)	Aminishiki	M4		(Japan)	Takekaze	6	-	9	-	0
9	-	6	-	0		(Japan)	**Shōhōzan**	M5		(Mongolia)	Kyokutenhō	6	-	9	-	0
8	-	7	-	0		(Mongolia)	**Tamawashi**	M6		(Brazil)	**Kaisei**	8	-	7	-	0
7	-	8	-	0		(Japan)	Takarafuji	M7	ø	(Japan)	Hōmashō	0	-	0	-	15
7	-	8	-	0		(Japan)	Kitataiki	M8		(South Korea)	**Tochinowaka**	9	-	6	-	0
9	-	6	-	0		(Japan)	**Takayasu**	M9		(Japan)	Fujiazuma	5	-	10	-	0
6	-	9	-	0		(Japan)	Sadanofuji	M10		(Japan)	**Endō**	11	-	4	-	0
2	-	13	-	0		(Mongolia)	Shōtenrō	M11		(Japan)	**Yoshikaze**	10	-	5	-	0
8	-	7	-	0		(Georgia (country))	**Gagamaru**	M12		(Japan)	**Chiyoōtori**	10	-	5	-	0
5	-	10	-	0		(Mongolia)	Kyokushūhō	M13		(Mongolia)	Tokitenkū	4	-	11	-	0
6	-	9	-	0		(Mongolia)	Kagamiō	M14		(Japan)	Masunoyama	7	-	8	-	0
8	-	7	-	0		(Japan)	**Tokushōryū**	M15		(Mongolia)	Takanoiwa	7	-	8	-	0
9	-	6	-	0		(Egypt)	**Ōsunaarashi**	M16		(Japan)	Satoyama	7	-	8	-	0
0	-	0	-	15	ø	(Japan)	Kotoyūki	M17	ø							

ø - Indicates a pull-out or absent rank
**winning record in bold**
**Yusho Winner**
***Won Playoff**

=== Haru basho ===
Osaka Prefectural Gymnasium, Osaka, 9 March – 23 March

2014 Haru basho results - Makuuchi Division
W		L		A	East			Rank	West			W		L		A
12	-	3	-	0		(Mongolia)	**Hakuhō**	Y		(Mongolia)	**Harumafuji**	12	-	3	-	0
14	-	1	-	0		(Mongolia)	**Kakuryū**	O		(Japan)	**Kotoshōgiku**	8	-	7	-	0
9	-	6	-	0		(Japan)	**Kisenosato**	O	ø							
12	-	3	-	0		(Japan)	**Gōeidō**	S	ø	(Bulgaria)	Kotoōshū	1	-	10	-	4
					ø			S		(Japan)	**Tochiōzan**	9	-	6	-	0
5	-	10	-	0		(Japan)	Toyonoshima	K		(Japan)	Shōhōzan	5	-	10	-	0
6	-	9	-	0		(Japan)	Endō	M1		(Mongolia)	Tamawashi	5	-	10	-	0
4	-	11	-	0		(Japan)	Okinoumi	M2		(South Korea)	Tochinowaka	4	-	11	-	0
6	-	9	-	0		(Brazil)	Kaisei	M3		(Japan)	Takayasu	5	-	10	-	0
10	-	5	-	0		(Japan)	**Yoshikaze**	M4		(Japan)	Ikioi	7	-	8	-	0
9	-	6	-	0		(Japan)	**Chiyoōtori**	M5		(Bulgaria)	**Aoiyama**	9	-	6	-	0
8	-	7	-	0		(Japan)	**Aminishiki**	M6		(Japan)	**Takekaze**	9	-	6	-	0
6	-	9	-	0		(Japan)	Toyohibiki	M7		(Japan)	**Chiyotairyū**	9	-	6	-	0
9	-	6	-	0		(Japan)	**Takarafuji**	M8		(Mongolia)	**Kyokutenhō**	9	-	6	-	0
6	-	9	-	0		(Japan)	Kitataiki	M9		(Georgia (country))	Gagamaru	6	-	9	-	0
8	-	7	-	0		(Japan)	**Myōgiryū**	M10		(Mongolia)	**Terunofuji**	8	-	7	-	0
8	-	7	-	0		(Egypt)	**Ōsunaarashi**	M11		(Japan)	**Tokushōryū**	9	-	6	-	0
8	-	7	-	0		(Japan)	**Chiyomaru**	M12		(Japan)	Sadanofuji	2	-	13	-	0
0	-	0	-	15	ø	(Japan)	Fujiazuma	M13		(Japan)	**Jōkōryū**	8	-	7	-	0
6	-	9	-	0		(Mongolia)	Azumaryū	M14		(Japan)	**Masunoyama**	8	-	7	-	0
3	-	8	-	4	ø	(Japan)	Tenkaihō	M15		(Mongolia)	**Takanoiwa**	10	-	5	-	0
5	-	10	-	0		(Mongolia)	Kagamiō	M16		(Japan)	Satoyama	5	-	10	-	0

ø - Indicates a pull-out or absent rank
**winning record in bold**
**Yusho Winner**

=== Natsu basho ===
Ryōgoku Kokugikan, Tokyo, 11 May – 25 May

2014 Natsu basho results - Makuuchi Division
W		L		A	East		Rank	West			W		L		A
14	-	1	-	0	(Mongolia)	**Hakuhō**	Y		(Mongolia)	**Harumafuji**	11	-	4	-	0
9	-	6	-	0	(Mongolia)	**Kakuryū**	Y	ø							
13	-	2	-	0	(Japan)	**Kisenosato**	O		(Japan)	Kotoshōgiku	5	-	10	-	0
8	-	7	-	0	(Japan)	**Gōeidō**	S		(Japan)	**Tochiōzan**	10	-	5	-	0
6	-	9	-	0	(Japan)	Yoshikaze	K		(Japan)	Chiyoōtori	5	-	10	-	0
8	-	7	-	0	(Bulgaria)	**Aoiyama**	M1		(Japan)	Takekaze	6	-	9	-	0
4	-	11	-	0	(Japan)	Chiyotairyū	M2		(Japan)	Takarafuji	4	-	11	-	0
10	-	5	-	0	(Japan)	**Aminishiki**	M3		(Mongolia)	Kyokutenhō	3	-	12	-	0
7	-	8	-	0	(Japan)	Endō	M4	ø	(Japan)	Toyonoshima	4	-	9	-	2
8	-	7	-	0	(Japan)	**Shōhōzan**	M5		(Japan)	**Ikioi**	11	-	4	-	0
8	-	7	-	0	(Brazil)	**Kaisei**	M6		(Mongolia)	**Tamawashi**	8	-	7	-	0
9	-	6	-	0	(Japan)	**Hōmashō**	M7		(Japan)	Tokushōryū	6	-	9	-	0
8	-	7	-	0	(Japan)	**Myōgiryū**	M8		(Japan)	Takayasu	6	-	9	-	0
9	-	6	-	0	(Mongolia)	**Terunofuji**	M9		(Japan)	Okinoumi	6	-	9	-	0
10	-	5	-	0	(Egypt)	**Ōsunaarashi**	M10		(South Korea)	**Tochinowaka**	9	-	6	-	0
8	-	7	-	0	(Japan)	**Toyohibiki**	M11		(Japan)	Chiyomaru	5	-	10	-	0
3	-	12	-	0	(Mongolia)	Takanoiwa	M12		(Japan)	**Jōkōryū**	9	-	6	-	0
4	-	11	-	0	(Japan)	Masunoyama	M13		(Japan)	**Kitataiki**	9	-	6	-	0
7	-	8	-	0	(Georgia (country))	Gagamaru	M14		(Mongolia)	Tokitenkū	7	-	8	-	0
9	-	6	-	0	(Mongolia)	**Kyokushūhō**	M15		(China)	**Sōkokurai**	8	-	7	-	0
7	-	8	-	0	(Mongolia)	Arawashi	M16	ø	(Japan)	Chiyonokuni	0	-	2	-	13
10	-	5	-	0	(Japan)	**Sadanoumi**	M17	ø							

ø - Indicates a pull-out or absent rank
**winning record in bold**
**Yusho Winner**

=== Nagoya basho ===
Aichi Prefectural Gymnasium, Nagoya, 13 July – 27 July

2014 Nagoya basho results - Makuuchi Division
W		L		A	East			Rank	West			W		L		A
13	-	2	-	0		(Mongolia)	**Hakuhō**	Y		(Mongolia)	**Harumafuji**	10	-	5	-	0
11	-	4	-	0		(Mongolia)	**Kakuryū**	Y	ø							
9	-	6	-	0		(Japan)	**Kisenosato**	O		(Japan)	**Kotoshōgiku**	12	-	3	-	0
12	-	3	-	0		(Japan)	**Gōeidō**	S	ø	(Japan)	Tochiōzan	2	-	6	-	7
3	-	12	-	0		(Japan)	Aminishiki	K		(Bulgaria)	Aoiyama	6	-	9	-	0
5	-	10	-	0		(Japan)	Ikioi	M1		(Japan)	Shōhōzan	4	-	11	-	0
1	-	5	-	9	ø	(Japan)	Hōmashō	M2		(Japan)	Yoshikaze	7	-	8	-	0
5	-	10	-	0		(Brazil)	Kaisei	M3		(Egypt)	Ōsunaarashi	7	-	8	-	0
3	-	12	-	0		(Mongolia)	Tamawashi	M4		(Japan)	**Takekaze**	9	-	6	-	0
6	-	9	-	0		(Japan)	Chiyoōtori	M5		(Japan)	**Endō**	8	-	7	-	0
9	-	6	-	0		(Mongolia)	**Terunofuji**	M6		(Japan)	**Myōgiryū**	11	-	4	-	0
5	-	10	-	0		(South Korea)	Tochinowaka	M7		(Japan)	**Jōkōryū**	10	-	5	-	0
10	-	5	-	0		(Japan)	**Chiyotairyū**	M8		(Japan)	**Toyohibiki**	8	-	7	-	0
9	-	6	-	0		(Japan)	**Takarafuji**	M9		(Japan)	Kitataiki	6	-	9	-	0
4	-	11	-	0		(Japan)	Tokushōryū	M10		(Japan)	**Toyonoshima**	10	-	5	-	0
6	-	9	-	0		(Japan)	Sadanoumi	M11		(Japan)	**Takayasu**	11	-	4	-	0
6	-	9	-	0		(Mongolia)	Kyokutenhō	M12		(Mongolia)	Kyokushūhō	6	-	9	-	0
6	-	8	-	1	ø	(Japan)	Okinoumi	M13		(China)	Sōkokurai	7	-	8	-	0
6	-	9	-	0		(Mongolia)	Kagamiō	M14		(Mongolia)	Azumaryū	7	-	8	-	0
5	-	10	-	0		(Georgia (country))	Gagamaru	M15		(Mongolia)	Tokitenkū	7	-	8	-	0
5	-	10	-	0		(Japan)	Wakanosato	M16		(Japan)	**Chiyomaru**	8	-	7	-	0
10	-	5	-	0		(Mongolia)	**Arawashi**	M17	ø							

ø - Indicates a pull-out or absent rank
**winning record in bold**
**Yusho Winner**

=== Aki basho ===
Ryōgoku Kokugikan, Tokyo, 14 September – 28 September

2014 Aki basho results - Makuuchi Division
W		L		A	East			Rank	West			W		L		A
14	-	1	-	0		(Mongolia)	**Hakuhō**	Y		(Mongolia)	**Kakuryū**	11	-	4	-	0
3	-	2	-	10	ø	(Mongolia)	Harumafuji	Y	ø							
9	-	6	-	0		(Japan)	**Kotoshōgiku**	O		(Japan)	**Kisenosato**	9	-	6	-	0
					ø			O		(Japan)	**Gōeidō**	8	-	7	-	0
0	-	0	-	15	ø	(Japan)	Myōgiryū	S		(Japan)	Takekaze	7	-	8	-	0
4	-	11	-	0		(Japan)	Jōkōryū	K	ø	(Japan)	Chiyotairyū	1	-	10	-	4
6	-	9	-	0		(Mongolia)	Terunofuji	M1		(Japan)	Endō	3	-	12	-	0
7	-	8	-	0		(Japan)	Takayasu	M2		(Japan)	Toyonoshima	6	-	6	-	3
10	-	5	-	0		(Bulgaria)	**Aoiyama**	M3		(Japan)	Yoshikaze	7	-	8	-	0
8	-	7	-	0		(Japan)	**Takarafuji**	M4		(Egypt)	Ōsunaarashi	7	-	8	-	0
8	-	7	-	0		(Japan)	**Toyohibiki**	M5		(Japan)	**Ikioi**	10	-	5	-	0
10	-	5	-	0		(Japan)	**Aminishiki**	M6		(Brazil)	**Kaisei**	8	-	7	-	0
6	-	9	-	0		(Japan)	Shōhōzan	M7		(Japan)	**Chiyoōtori**	8	-	7	-	0
11	-	4	-	0		(Japan)	**Tochiōzan**	M8		(Mongolia)	Arawashi	5	-	10	-	0
7	-	8	-	0		(Mongolia)	Tamawashi	M9		(South Korea)	Tochinowaka	4	-	11	-	0
13	-	2	-	0		(Mongolia)	**Ichinojō**	M10		(Japan)	Kitataiki	7	-	8	-	0
4	-	11	-	0		(Japan)	Chiyomaru	M11		(Mongolia)	Takanoiwa	7	-	8	-	0
8	-	7	-	0		(Japan)	**Sadanoumi**	M12		(Japan)	Sadanofuji	4	-	11	-	0
0	-	0	-	15	ø	(Japan)	Hōmashō	M13		(China)	Sōkokurai	7	-	8	-	0
8	-	7	-	0		(Mongolia)	**Kyokutenhō**	M14	ø	(Mongolia)	Azumaryū	0	-	0	-	15
7	-	8	-	0		(Mongolia)	Kyokushūhō	M15		(Japan)	**Okinoumi**	10	-	5	-	0
6	-	9	-	0		(Mongolia)	Tokitenkū	M16		(Mongolia)	Kagamiō	6	-	9	-	0

ø - Indicates a pull-out or absent rank
**winning record in bold**
**Yusho Winner**

=== Kyushu basho ===
Fukuoka Kokusai Center, Kyushu, 9 November – 23 November

2014 Kyushu basho results - Makuuchi Division
W		L		A	East			Rank	West			W		L		A
14	-	1	-	0		(Mongolia)	**Hakuhō**	Y		(Mongolia)	**Kakuryū**	12	-	3	-	0
11	-	4	-	0		(Mongolia)	Harumafuji	Y	ø							
6	-	9	-	0		(Japan)	Kotoshōgiku	O		(Japan)	**Kisenosato**	11	-	4	-	0
					ø			O		(Japan)	Gōeidō	5	-	10	-	0
8	-	7	-	0		(Bulgaria)	**Aoiyama**	S		(Mongolia)	**Ichinojō**	8	-	7	-	0
2	-	13	-	0		(Japan)	Takekaze	K	ø	(Japan)	Ikioi	6	-	9	-	0
8	-	7	-	0		(Japan)	**Tochiōzan**	M1		(Japan)	Aminishiki	6	-	9	-	0
8	-	7	-	0		(Japan)	**Takarafuji**	M2		(Japan)	Toyohibiki	5	-	10	-	0
10	-	5	-	0		(Japan)	**Takayasu**	M3		(Mongolia)	**Terunofuji**	8	-	7	-	0
7	-	8	-	0		(Brazil)	Kaisei	M4		(Japan)	Yoshikaze	4	-	8	-	3
6	-	9	-	0		(Japan)	Chiyoōtori	M5		(Egypt)	Ōsunaarashi	4	-	6	-	5
8	-	7	-	0		(Japan)	**Toyonoshima**	M6		(Japan)	**Jōkōryū**	8	-	7	-	0
8	-	7	-	0		(Japan)	**Okinoumi**	M7		(Japan)	Sadanoumi	7	-	8	-	0
11	-	4	-	0		(Georgia (country))	**Tochinoshin**	M8		(Japan)	**Endō**	10	-	5	-	0
9	-	6	-	0		(Japan)	**Chiyotairyū**	M9		(Japan)	Tokushōryū	4	-	11	-	0
7	-	8	-	0		(Japan)	Shōhōzan	M10		(Mongolia)	**Tamawashi**	8	-	7	-	0
9	-	6	-	0		(Japan)	**Myōgiryū**	M11		(Mongolia)	**Kyokutenhō**	10	-	5	-	0
3	-	12	-	0		(Japan)	Kitataiki	M12		(Japan)	**Homarefuji**	8	-	7	-	0
3	-	12	-	0		(Mongolia)	Takanoiwa	M13		(Mongolia)	**Arawashi**	8	-	7	-	0
5	-	10	-	0		(Russia)	Amuru	M14		(China)	**Sōkokurai**	9	-	6	-	0
3	-	12	-	0		(South Korea)	Tochinowaka	M15		(Mongolia)	**Kyokushūhō**	9	-	6	-	0
8	-	7	-	0		(Japan)	**Kotoyūki**	M16		(Japan)	**Chiyomaru**	8	-	7	-	0

ø - Indicates a pull-out or absent rank
**winning record in bold**
**Yusho Winner**

== News ==
=== January ===
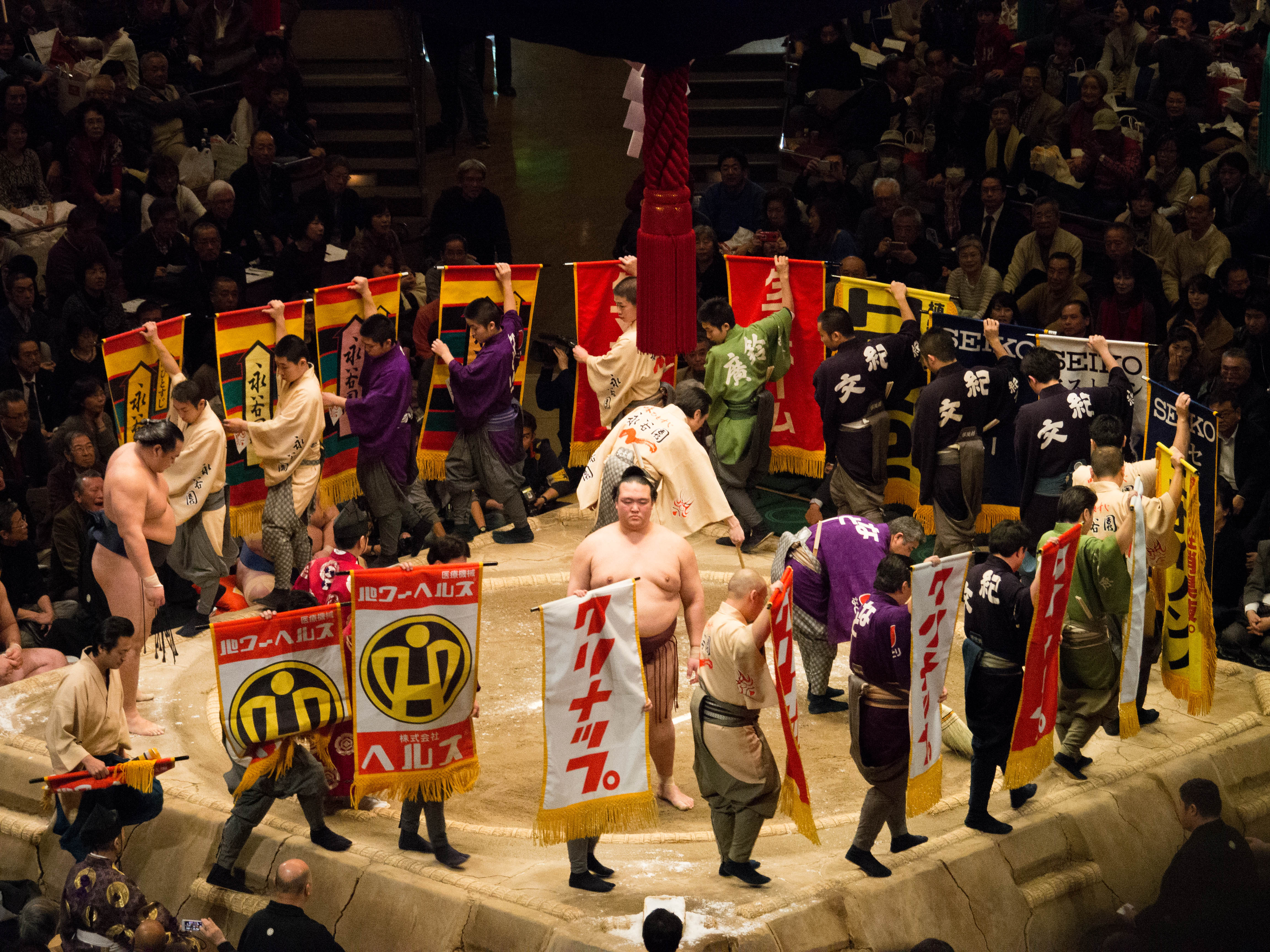
Kisenosato faces Kakuryū during the January 2014 tournament.

- 3: Kazakhstani makushita Kazafuzan of the Nishikido stable is arrested and detained at the Azabu Police Station for destruction of property after getting drunk and destroying a Roppongi restaurant's kadomatsu. The Sumo Association promises strict precautions against the wrestler and his stablemaster, former sekiwake Mitoizumi, who apologized and called the incident "highly regrettable."
- 7: Kotoōshū and Tokitenkū acquire Japanese citizenship, respectively becoming the first European wrestler and third Mongolian wrestler to do so.
- 10: Yokozuna Harumafuji, the winner of the November 2013 tournament, withdraws from the January 2014 tournament due to a left ankle injury, the first time in over a year he will not appear alongside fellow yokozuna Hakuhō. The previous yokozuna to withdraw from a tournament following a championship victory was Asashōryū, who was suspended from participating in the September 2007 tournament after winning the July 2007 tournament.
- 12: On the first day of the New Year tournament, Hakuhō defeats Tochiōzan and achieves 800 total wins across 76 tournaments, breaking Taihō's record for the fastest time in reaching the milestone. At the same time, he is tied with Musashimaru for the most wins for a foreign wrestler in the makuuchi division at 706.
- 13: Hakuhō defeats Toyonoshima on the second day of the New Year tournament, surpassing Musashimaru's record for the most makuuchi wins for a foreign wrestler with 707 wins. He also ranks 5th in the most makuuchi wins for any wrestler.
- 15: In the fight between Tokitenkū and Sadanofuji on the fourth day of the New Year tournament, Sadanofuji's mawashi loosened twice, a rare occurrence. Sadanofuji urged fellow maegashira Yoshikaze to assist in the second retightening effort. Later, in the fight between Tokitenkū and Shōtenrō on the ninth day, which was held on January 20, Shōtenrō's mawashi also loosened twice.
- 18: The Japan Sumo Association announces an election to decide candidates for directors and deputy directors for the Association's transition to a public interest incorporated foundation. Former sekiwake Daijuyama is appointed chairman of the election administration committee.
- 21:
  - Former sekiwake Kotonishiki announces that he will change his elder name to "Nakamura" and move from the Sadogatake stable to the Oguruma stable.
  - On the 10th day of the New Year tournament, Kyokutenhō becomes the oldest active wrestler in post-war history at 39 years and four months old. He also holds the third highest number of appearances at 1,731.
- 25: Former jūryō Kotokuni announces his retirement.
- 26:
  - Former maegashira Kimurayama announces his retirement and adopts the elder name "Iwatomo".
  - Chiyomaru wins the jūryō championship. His younger brother Chiyoōtori was the previous jūryō champion, making them the first pair of brothers to win consecutive championships.
  - Terunofuji comes second to Chiyomaru with a score of 12–3 at the top jūryō rank, assuring his makuuchi debut in March.
  - Ōzeki Kisenosato withdraws for the first time in his career due to an injury to his right big toe, ending his consecutive appearance streak at 953.
  - Hakuhō wins his 28th makuuchi championship with a playoff victory against Kakuryū, after both men finish with identical 14–1 records.
- 27: The Cabinet Office announces that the Japan Sumo Association will be certified as a public interest incorporated foundation the following day.
- 30: The Japan Sumo Association approves the establishment of the Asakayama stable and a change of stablemaster at the Dewanoumi stable.

=== February ===
- 1: Former ōzeki Miyabiyama's retirement ceremony is held at the Ryōgoku Kokugikan.
- 8: Former ōzeki Baruto's retirement ceremony is held at the Ryōgoku Kokugikan.
- 14: The Japan Sumo Association approves the introduction of Nihon University amateur yokozuna Shōgo Kawabata as a makushita tsukedashi.

=== March ===
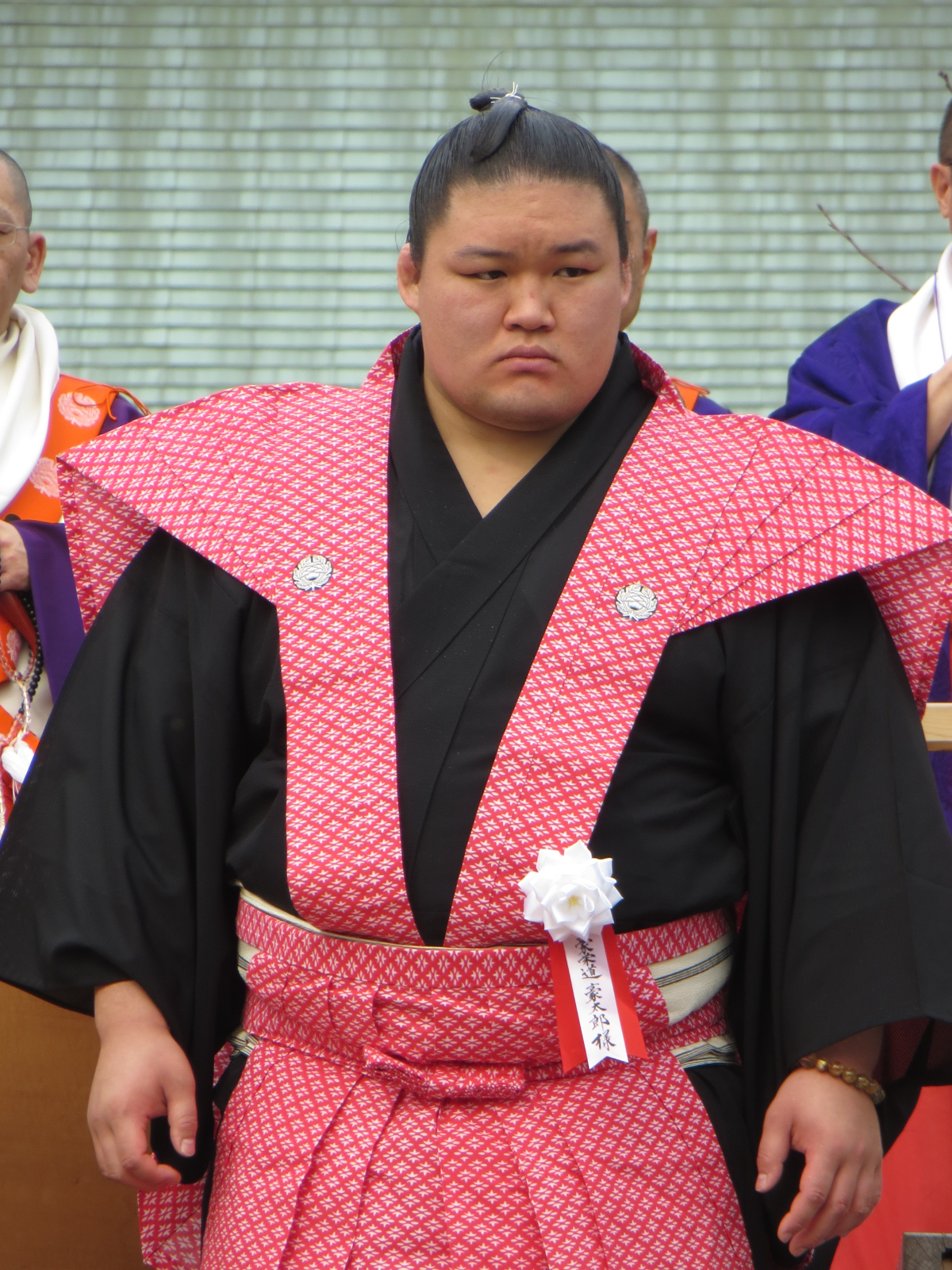
Gōeidō, pictured in his hometown of Neyagawa in February, was runner-up in March.

- 20:
  - On the 12th day of the spring tournament, Kyokutenhō, at 39 years and six months old, achieves a winning record, becoming the oldest makuuchi wrestler to do so since the establishment of six annual tournaments.
  - Former ōzeki Kotoōshū announces his retirement after posting nine consecutive losses in the spring tournament as sekiwake.
- 23: Kakuryū defeats Kotoshōgiku on the spring tournament's final day and wins his first top division championship with a 14–1 record. Chairman Kitanoumi decides to consult the Yokozuna Deliberation Council concerning Kakuryū's promotion to yokozuna.
- 24:
  - The Yokozuna Deliberation Council unanimously recommends Kakuryū's promotion to yokozuna.
  - The Japan Sumo Association holds its first board and council since becoming a public interest incorporated foundation, and Kitanoumi is reappointed as chairman.
- 26: The summer tournament banzuke meeting is held, as well as a board meeting in which it is decided that Kakuryū would become the 71st yokozuna. He is the fourth Mongolian and sixth foreign wrestler in history to achieve this rank.
- 28: Kakuryū's yokozuna promotion ceremony is held at the Meiji Shrine.

=== April ===
- 3:
  - The Japan Sumo Association's first division of duties since becoming a public interest incorporated foundation is carried out, with Hakkaku selected as business manager, Takanohana as general planning manager, and Dekiyama as public relations manager.
  - The disposition of five stablemasters (including two who have died) who had been suspended for promotion due to baseball gambling, match-fixing and drunk driving is lifted, and they are promoted to committee members and chiefs.
- 26: Former maegashira Kimurayama's retirement ceremony is held at the Ryōgoku Kokugikan.

=== May ===
- 11: The May tournament opens to a full house for the first time since 1997.
- 16: The sixth day of the May tournament is the first weekday in the May tournament's first half to see a full house since 1997.
- 20:
  - Former jūryō Tanzo retires.
  - Kyokutenhō becomes the oldest top division wrestler to achieve a bout victory in May.
- 21: Former maegashira Kimikaze retires.
- 22: On the 12th day of the May tournament, Gōeidō appeared to defeat Kakuryū, but Hakuhō, who was on the sidelines, made a statement that Gōeidō may have grabbed Kakuryū's mage. Following a mono-ii, the judges determine that Gōeidō grabbed Kakuryū's mage, and Kakuryū is granted a victory. Hakuhō is the first wrestler since Takanonami in January 1996 to have made such a statement, and it is the first time in history that a yokozuna has won a match due to his opponent committing a penalty.
- 23: On the 13th day of the May tournament, the Ryōgoku Kokugikan sees a full house for the fourth time since January 1999.
- 24: At the final bout of the May tournament's 14th day, Harumafuji is penalized with a loss for grabbing Kisenosato's mage. He is the second yokozuna after Asashōryū in 2003 to lose a bout for committing a penalty.
- 25: Hakuhō defeats Harumafuji, achieving his 29th championship victory with a score of 14–1.
- 29: Tokitenkū (highest rank komusubi) acquires the elder name "Magaki", becoming the first Mongolian wrestler to acquire an elder name.

=== June ===
- 1: Former maegashira Hōchiyama's retirement ceremony is held at the Ryōgoku Kokugikan.
- 30: The July tournament banzuke is announced. It is Gōeidō's 14th tournament as sekiwake, the highest number since the Showa era.

=== July ===
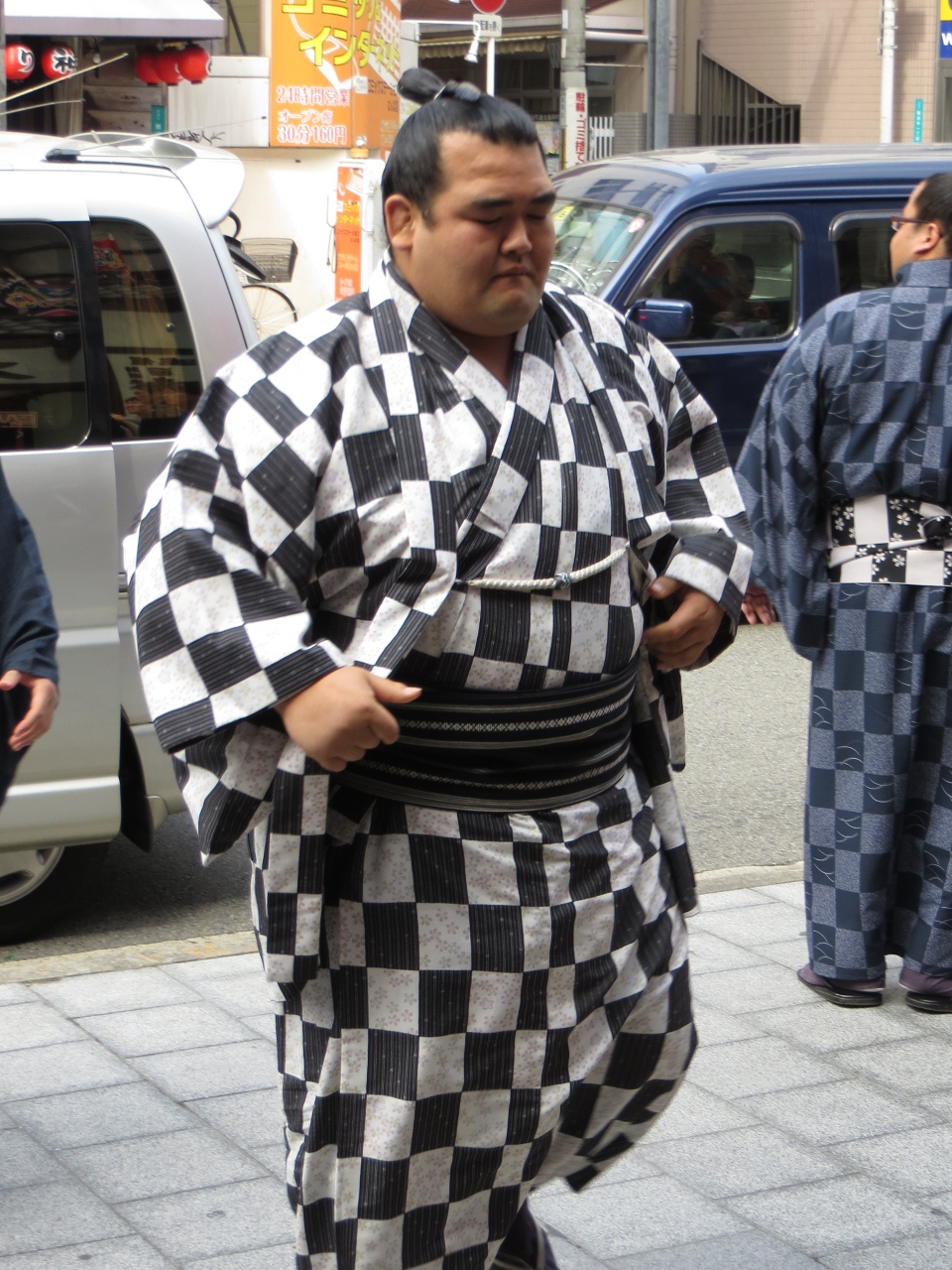
Kotoshōgiku was runner-up for the first time as an ōzeki in July.

- 15: Yokozuna Hakuhō, Harumafuji and Kakuryū win consecutive victories on the first day of the July tournament. It is the first time in 25 years that three active yokozuna have won their first day bout, after Hokutoumi, Chiyonofuji and Ōnokuni did the same in the March 1989 tournament.
- 16: Maegashira Yoshikaze defeats yokozuna Harumafuji and achieves his first kinboshi. At 32 years, 3 months and 27 days old, he is the oldest wrestler to win his first kinboshi since the establishment of six annual tournaments, breaking Tamaryū's record by six days.
- 17: Maegashira Ōsunaarashi defeats yokozuna Kakuryū and achieves his first kinboshi in his 15th tournament, the second fastest time to do so after Konishiki who did it in his 14th tournament.
- 18: Ōsunaarashi wins another kinboshi by defeating yokozuna Harumafuji. He is the first wrestler to win a kinboshi on two consecutive days since Tochinonada, who defeated Asashōryū and Musashimaru in November 2003.
- 21: Maegashira Takekaze defeats yokozuna Harumafuji and achieves his first kinboshi at 35 years and one month old, breaking Yoshikaze's record for the oldest wrestler to win his first kinboshi by two years and ten months.
- 24: Former maegashira Takanoyama retires.
- 27:
  - Former jūryō Oniarashi retires.
  - Hakuhō defeats Harumafuji and wins his 30th championship victory with a score of 13–2.
- 30: The September tournament banzuke meeting is held, and Gōeidō's promotion to ōzeki is confirmed. He is the first ōzeki from Osaka Prefecture since Maenoyama's promotion in July 1970.

=== August ===
- 7: A reconstruction prayer event hosted by the Japan Sumo Association is held in Iwaki, Fukushima.
- 13: The Sumo Wrestlers' Association, a group of sekitori, presents a dohyō to the city of Kesennuma, which was damaged by the 2011 Tōhoku earthquake and tsunami. It is the second disaster area to receive a dohyō following Yamada, Iwate.

=== September ===
- 1: The September tournament banzuke is announced. Takekaze is promoted to sekiwake at 35 years and two months old. He is the oldest new sekiwake in post-war history, and at 68 tournaments, his is the slowest promotion to sekiwake in history.
- 13: Kyokutenhō celebrates his 40th birthday, becoming the first active wrestler in his 40s since the establishment of six annual tournaments. Nayoroiwa previously reached his 40th birthday during the Autumn 1954 tournament.
- 17: On the fourth day of the September tournament, yokozuna Harmafuji becomes the first yokozuna in history to lose a second match by foul for grabbing opponent Yoshikaze's mage. Although Yoshikaze is a maegashira, he does not receive a kinboshi due to his default win. Harumafuji withdraws from the tournament due to an eye injury he sustained in the match.
- 22: The Japan Sumo Association suspends holding yokozuna-related ceremonies at the Meiji Shrine and Tomioka Hachiman Shrine due to an outbreak of dengue fever.
- 24: On the 11th day of the September tournament, maegashira Ichinojō defeats ōzeki Kisenosato and achieves his tenth victory. In five tournaments, he sets records for the fastest time to defeat an ōzeki and to achieve a double-digit winning score in the makuuchi division.
- 26: Former komusubi Wakakōyū retires and takes on the elder name Shiranui.
- 27: The bout of the tournament is fought between Hakuhō and newcomer Ichinojō, both of whom have twelve wins and one loss. Ichinojō, who is bidding to become the first makuuchi debutant to win the championship since Ryōgoku in 1914, had beaten two ōzeki and a yokozuna in the previous three days but does not overcome Hakuhō, who moves to within one win of his 31st championship.
- 28: After tying Chiyonofuji's record of 31 top division championships, Hakuhō says, "I watched him when I was young and always aspired to be a wrestler like him so I am very happy." Ichinojō wins his last bout to finish with a 13–2 record, the highest score for a new makuuchi wrestler since the introduction of 15-day tournaments.

=== October ===
- 2: The board of directors of the Japan Sumo Association decides to remove the word "intentionally" from the expression "intentionally grasping the hair" stipulated in the forbidden moves in the official sumo rules. The new foul provisions will apply beginning with the November tournament.
- 4: Former ōzeki Kotoōshū's retirement ceremony is held at the Ryōgoku Kokugikan.
- 27: The November tournament banzuke is announced, and Ichinojō receives the fastest promotion to sekiwake in history. Additionally, Amūru's makuuchi debut is the slowest for a foreign wrestler.

=== November ===
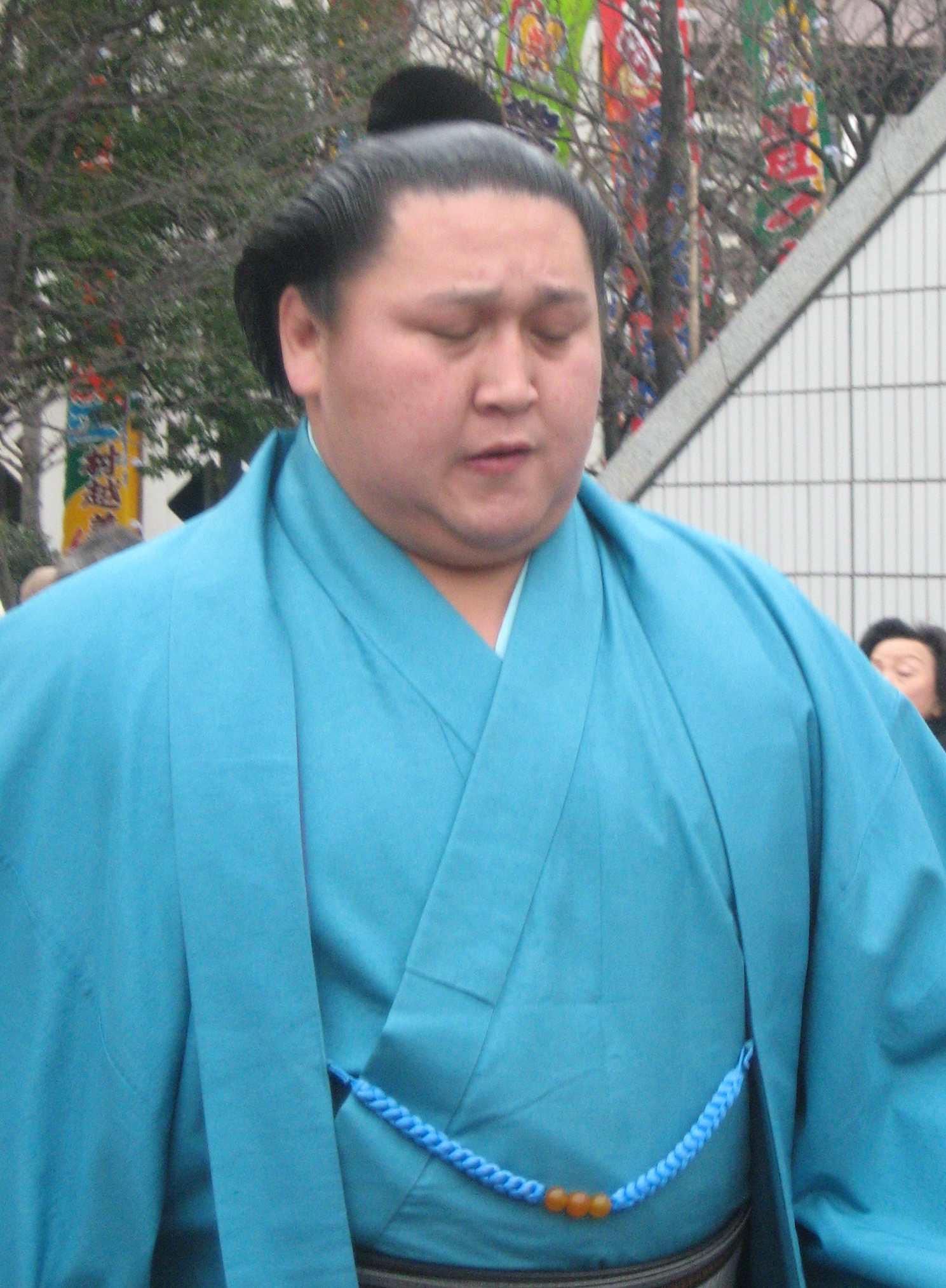
Kyokutenho won a special prize at the age of 40 in November.

- 8: In the National Student Sumo Championships, Hisashi Ōmichi, a fourth-year student at Toyo University, wins the title of "Amateur Yokozuna" as well as the rank of makushita #15 in the next professional tournament.
- 11: Maegashira Takayasu wins a kinboshi with the isamiashi of his yokozuna opponent Harumafuji. It is the first time in 42 years that a kinboshi has been won in this fashion since Kitanofuji's loss to Takanohana in the March 1972 tournament. It is also the first time in 18 years that a yokozuna committed an isamiashi since Akebono's loss to sekiwake Takatōriki in the May 1996 tournament.
- 14: Yokozuna Hakuhō is defeated by maegashira Takayasu and relinquishes a kinboshi. It is the first kinboshi to be given by Hakuhō in ten tournaments since his loss against Myōgiryū in the January 2013 tournament, and his consecutive streak of wins against maegashira wrestlers ends at 82. His record of consecutive uninterrupted kachikoshi also ends at ten tournaments.
- 16:
  - At the regular Japan Sumo Association board meeting, a provision is decided and introduced in which elders who have retired at the age of 65 may be rehired until the age of 70.
  - Hakuhō achieves his eighth consecutive kachikoshi.
- 20: The Fukuoka Kokusai Center sees its first full house on a weekday in 17 years.
- 22:
  - Kotoshōgiku obtains a makekoshi, making him and Gōeidō the first pair of ōzeki to receive makekoshi since Miyabiyama and Musōyama in the July 2000 tournament.
  - For the first time in 15 years, all six tournaments of 2014 would see their championship decided on the final day.
- 23:
  - Hakuhō equals Taihō's record of 32 tournament titles, set in 1971, by defeating Kakuryū to finish two wins clear of his nearest rival at 14–1. Hakuhō was inspired by yokozuna Taihō, who had links to his Miyagino stable and occasionally attended training sessions there. Hakuhō had visited Taihō just two days before his death in January 2013 and told him he would try to break his record. Hakuhō's only defeat is to Takayasu, who scores 10–5 and wins the Outstanding Performance Award. Both sekiwake, Aoiyama and Ichinojō, were making their debuts at the rank and both come through with winning records, the first time this has happened in seven years. Tokitenkū wins a jūryō championship for the second time since the May 2004 tournament. At 35 years and two months old, he is the second-oldest post-war jūryō champion, and at 62 tournaments, it is the largest space between jūryō championships in post-war history.
  - Maegashira Kyokutenhō, at 40 years and two months old, wins his seventh Fighting Spirit prize and becomes the oldest special prize recipient in history. He surpasses the record held by Wakasegawa, who received the Technique prize at 38 years and nine months old.
  - Oyakata Tateyama (former sekiwake Tamanofuji) retires from the Japan Sumo Association as he is about to reach the mandatory retirement age of 65. However, he subsequently becomes the first applicant of the Association's new reemployment provision for elders.
- 24: Oyakata Hanaregoma (former sekiwake Tamanoshima) and oyakata Nishonoseki (former maegashira Tamarikidō) transfer from the Kataonami stable to the Matsugane stable.

=== December ===
- 1: Oyakata Matsugane (former ōzeki Wakashimazu) and oyakata Nishonoseki (former maegashira Tamarikidō) exchange elder names, and the Matsugane stable is renamed the Nishonoseki stable.
- 15: Former maegashira Tochinowaka retires.

== Deaths ==
- May 18: Former ozeki Kaiketsu, also former Hanaregoma Oyakata and head of the Sumo Association, aged 66.
- August 12: Former komusubi Futatsuryū Jun'ichi, also former Tokitsukaze Oyakata, who was jailed after a hazing scandal, aged 64, of lung cancer.
- August 29: Former komusubi Ryūko Seihō, also former Hanaregoma Oyakata, and an actor and celebrity, aged 73, of a heart attack.
- September 17: Former sekiwake Wakachichibu, also former Tokiwayama Oyakata, aged 75, of liver failure.

== See also ==
- Glossary of sumo terms
- List of active sumo wrestlers
- List of years in sumo
- List of yokozuna
