= Shōhōzan Yūya =

Japanese sumo wrestler

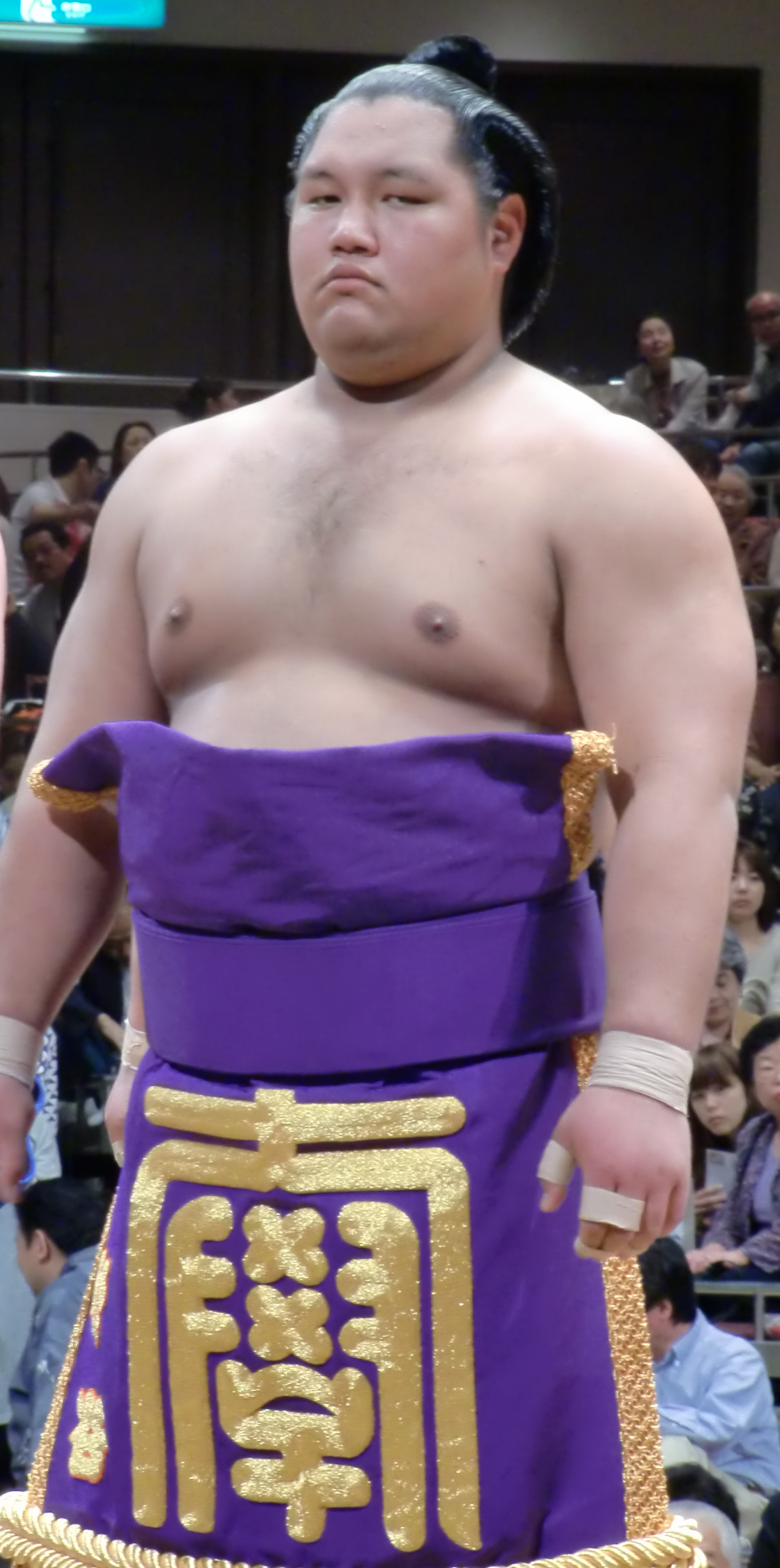
- Shōhōzan in 2010

Personal information
- Native name: 松鳳山 裕也
- Born: Yūya Matsutani; February 9, 1984 (age 42) Chikujō, Fukuoka, Japan
- Height: 1.76 m (5 ft 9 1/2 in)
- Weight: 133 kg (293 lb)

Sport
- Sport: Sumo
- University team: Komazawa University
- Retired: June, 2022
- Heya: Hanaregoma
- Record: 582-605-22
- Debut: March, 2006
- Highest rank: Komusubi (January, 2013)
- Championships: 1 (Jūryō); 2 (Makushita); 1 (Jonidan)
- Special Prizes: Fighting Spirit (3); Outstanding Performance (1)
- Gold Stars: 5 Harumafuji (3); Kakuryū (2)
- Updated on 22 June 2022

Shōhōzan Yūya (Japanese: 松鳳山 裕也; born February 9, 1984 as Yūya Matsutani (松谷 裕也)) is a Japanese former professional sumo wrestler from Chikujō, Fukuoka. Wrestling for Hanaregoma stable, he made his professional debut in March 2006 and reached the top makuuchi division in November 2011. His highest rank was komusubi, which he achieved on five occasions. He earned three Fighting Spirit prizes, five kinboshi or gold stars for defeating yokozuna, and was runner-up in one tournament before retiring from competition in June 2022.

== Early life and sumo background ==
He played baseball and judo in his junior high school years, but on transferring to an industrial and science high school in nearby Ōita Prefecture he joined the sumo club after being scouted by the coach at the school. In his second and third years he participated in two annual regional tournaments. In these tournaments, he managed to reach the best eight, but was beaten both times by future ōzeki Kotoshōgiku. In Komazawa University, he was a regular on the sumo team and managed to be runner up for the championship at a national competition.

== Career ==
=== Early career ===
His successes at this level garnered him many invitations from various sumo stables but chose to enter Matsugane, the stable that first approached him (it has since changed its name to Nishonoseki and then Hanaregoma). He entered the professional ring in May 2006, fighting under his own surname of Matsutani. He was not able to achieve makushita tsukedashi status as he had never managed to win a national tournament before turning pro. He posted a decent jonokuchi debut with a 5–2 record. In the next tournament, he took the jonidan championship with a perfect 7–0 record and a playoff victory over fellow up-and-comer Sakaizawa. Three strong tournaments in sandanme got him promotion to the third makushita division in March, 2007. He had had a very strong showing up to this point, and had claimed he wanted to make makushita before the time for his hair to be tied up in a topknot came. He did achieve this goal, and though he started out strong with two consecutive 6–1 tournaments, as is often the case with wrestlers trying to advance through makushita, this is where he began to have trouble. He would struggle in the division for exactly three years. He began to find his stride in July, 2009. He achieved a 6–1 record and had a playoff bout against the future Akiseyama, which he lost. His sumo would grow more consistent from this point and after four more tournaments in makushita in which he had only one losing tournament, he finally qualified for the second tier jūryō division for the May 2010 tournament. He was only the second wrestler in thirty-three years from Komazawa University to achieve promotion to jūryō.

In his sekitori debut he won 9 of 15 bouts and was promoted to jūryō #8 for the following tournament, but only managed a 6–9 record. His losing tournament would be the least of his concerns though. It was revealed on August 12, 2010 in a follow-up to the June investigation into baseball gambling, that Matsutani, along with a sandanme wrestler from his stable had also been involved in gambling, but had not come forward, and had participated in the July, 2010 tournament while other wrestlers who were implicated or who admitted involvement had been suspended. He, along with his stablemate and his coach, apologized to the public in a press conference soon after. In September, the Japan Sumo Association handed down the decision not to dismiss the wrestlers, but to suspend them for two tournaments (September and November).

Upon his return in the first tournament of 2011 he had fallen to makushita #51. Seemingly burning to redeem himself, Matsutani pulled off a perfect 7–0 championship, and even with the turmoil due to the following tournament being cancelled due to the match-fixing scandal he still pulled off another perfect championship in the succeeding May tournament. In many ways, this would mirror sekitori Toyonoshima's feat in previous months of bouncing back from a demotion to jūryō for baseball gambling by pulling off a championship in that tournament and almost pulling off a makuuchi championship in a playoff loss to Hakuhō in the following tournament. Matsutani would attain re-entry to jūryō at a career high #3. He only managed a 7–8 record, but in the following September tournament at jūryō #5 would bounce back with a convincing 11–4 winning tournament.

=== Makuuchi career ===
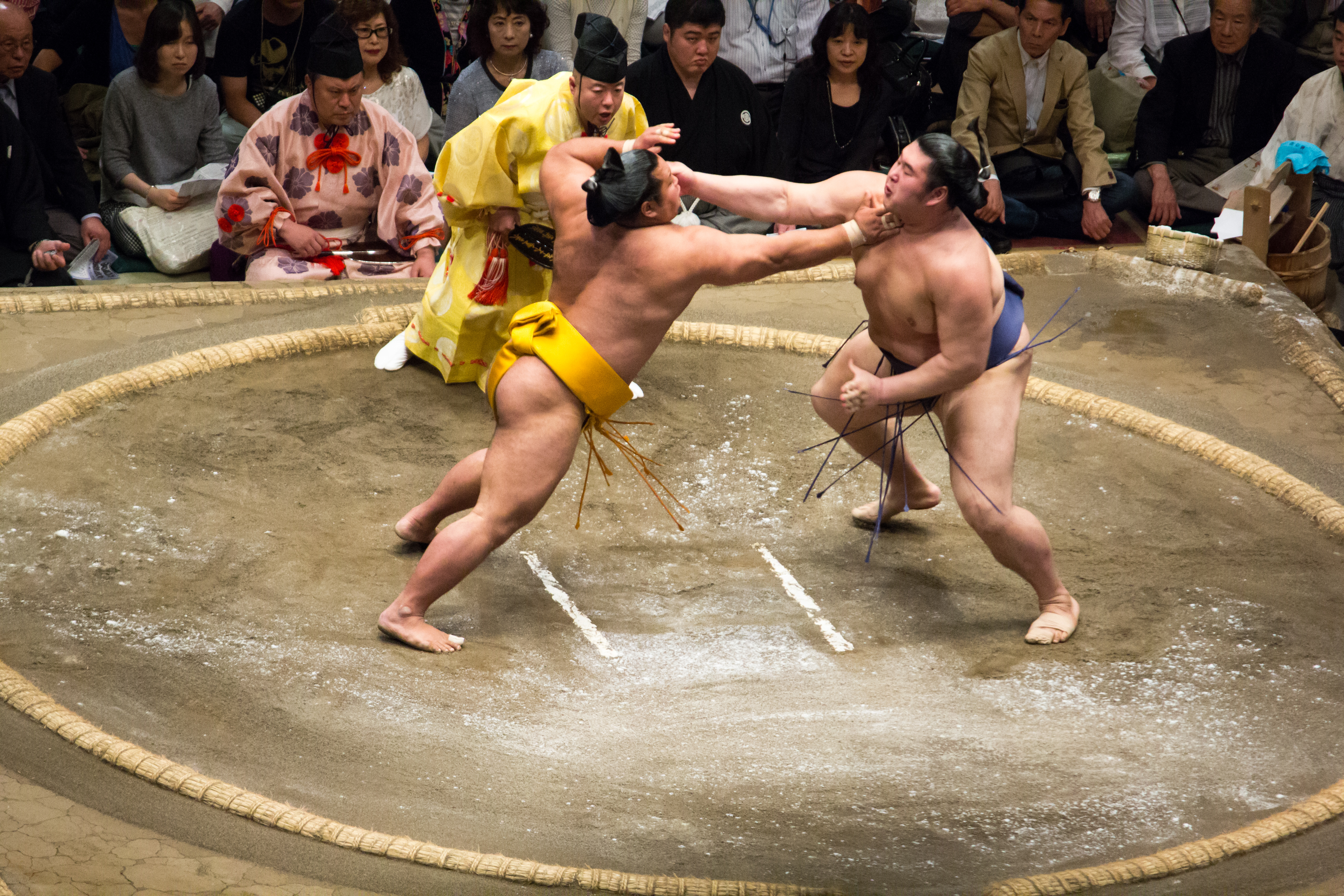
Shōhōzan (left) facing Tochinowaka in May 2014

On his November 2011 tournament top tier makuuchi debut, he adopted the shikona Shōhōzan and achieved a 10–5 record. He reached what was at that time a career high of maegashira 1 in the September tournament of 2012. He had his best tournament to date in the following tournament in November, scoring ten wins and defeating three ōzeki. This earned him his first special prize, for Fighting Spirit. He was promoted to komusubi for the January 2013 tournament, becoming the first man from Matsugane stable to reach the san'yaku ranks since its establishment in 1990. He was re-promoted to komusubi three times, though he never held the rank for more than one tournament. He won his second Fighting Spirit prize in September 2013, and also earned his first kinboshi for an upset of a yokozuna while ranked as a maegashira, defeating Harumafuji.

After a disastrous 1–14 performance in the March 2015 tournament, he was demoted to jūryō, and was unable to get a winning record in the next tournament to return immediately to the top division. In September however he won the division with a 13–2 record and was promoted back to the top division for the next tournament. In November he produced his best performance in the top division, winning twelve matches and finishing in a three-way tie for second place: only a defeat by Aminishiki on the final day prevented him from reaching a play-off for the championship. His efforts saw him being awarded his third Fighting Spirit award.

In January 2016 he defeated Harumafuji again to win his second kinboshi, but he otherwise had a relatively quiet year, and was not able to put together enough consistent performances to earn promotion back to san'yaku. In the January 2017 tournament he earned his third kinboshi, once again beating Harumafuji, and he got his fourth in March, but he remained in the maegashira ranks for the rest of the year. In May 2018 he won the Outstanding Performance prize for being the only wrestler to defeat the tournament winner, Kakuryū. This performance was rewarded with promotion to komusubi for the first time since 2014, but he lasted only one tournament at the rank with a 3–12 record. He was demoted to jūryō after the September 2020 tournament, by which time he was the oldest man in the top division, but he decided to continue wrestling. He earned promotion back to makuuchi for the November 2021 tournament in Fukuoka Prefecture at the age of 37 years and 8 months, making him the ninth oldest wrestler to do so. He was the only wrestler from Fukuoka in the top division at that time.

== Retirement from sumo ==
Shōhōzan's 11-year run as a sekitori came to an end in May 2022 when he could score only 3–12 at the rank of juryō 12. He said afterwards he would take time to consider his future, paying attention to his physical condition.

The Japan Sumo Association announced Shōhōzan's retirement on 22 June 2022. His retirement ceremony was held at the Ryōgoku Kokugikan on 11 February 2023. About 400 people took part in cutting his topknot in the ceremony, which was closed to the public.

== Personal life ==
He had become known for having a very stern, almost scary visage, but in his jūryō entry interview people were surprised to learn he had a very expressive smiling face and a friendly way of talking. He even admitted to being sensitive enough to cry when he first heard of his jūryō entry.

Shōhōzan is married, with his first son born in 2014. He also has another younger son.

== Fighting style ==
Shōhōzan specialised in pushing and thrusting techniques, or oshi-sumo. His most common winning kimarite was oshi-dashi, or push out, followed by yori-kiri or force out.

== Career record ==
Shōhōzan Yūya
Year	January Hatsu basho, Tokyo	March Haru basho, Osaka	May Natsu basho, Tokyo	July Nagoya basho, Nagoya	September Aki basho, Tokyo	November Kyūshū basho, Fukuoka
2006	x	(Maezumo)	West Jonokuchi #14; 5–2	West Jonidan #90; 7–0–P; Champion	West Sandanme #84; 5–2	West Sandanme #52; 6–1
2007	East Sandanme #2; 4–3	East Makushita #54; 6–1	East Makushita #26; 6–1	East Makushita #9; 3–4	East Makushita #14; 3–4	West Makushita #19; 2–5
2008	West Makushita #34; 4–3	West Makushita #25; 4–3	West Makushita #17; 6–1	East Makushita #5; 1–6	East Makushita #26; 4–3	West Makushita #16; 3–4
2009	West Makushita #24; 6–1	East Makushita #9; 3–4	East Makushita #13; 3–4	East Makushita #21; 6–1–P	East Makushita #7; 4–3	West Makushita #5; 3–4
2010	West Makushita #7; 6–1	East Makushita #1; 4–3	East Jūryō #12; 9–6	East Jūryō #8; 6–9	East Jūryō #11; Suspended; 0–0–15	West Makushita #11; Suspended; 0–0–7
2011	West Makushita #51; 7–0; Champion	West Makushita #4; Tournament Cancelled; Match fixing investigation 0–0–0	West Makushita #4; 7–0; Champion	East Jūryō #3; 7–8	East Jūryō #5; 11–4	East Maegashira #15; 10–5
2012	East Maegashira #8; 8–7	East Maegashira #6; 7–8	East Maegashira #7; 9–6	West Maegashira #3; 8–7	East Maegashira #1; 7–8	East Maegashira #2; 10–5; F
2013	West Komusubi #1; 4–11	West Maegashira #4; 7–8	East Maegashira #5; 8–7	East Komusubi #1; 7–8	East Maegashira #1; 8–7; F★	East Komusubi #1; 4–11
2014	East Maegashira #5; 9–6	West Komusubi #1; 5–10	East Maegashira #5; 8–7	East Maegashira #1; 4–11	East Maegashira #7; 6–9	East Maegashira #10; 7–8
2015	East Maegashira #11; 8–7	East Maegashira #8; 1–14	West Jūryō #3; 7–8	West Jūryō #4; 6–9	West Jūryō #6; 13–2; Champion	West Maegashira #10; 12–3; F
2016	West Maegashira #1; 5–10 ★	West Maegashira #5; 4–11	West Maegashira #11; 11–4	East Maegashira #4; 5–10	East Maegashira #7; 8–7	East Maegashira #5; 8–7
2017	East Maegashira #2; 7–8 ★	East Maegashira #3; 5–10 ★	East Maegashira #8; 6–9	West Maegashira #10; 10–5	East Maegashira #3; 8–7	East Maegashira #3; 3–12
2018	East Maegashira #9; 9–6	East Maegashira #4; 8–7	East Maegashira #2; 8–7; O★	West Komusubi #1; 3–12	East Maegashira #7; 7–8	West Maegashira #7; 10–5
2019	West Maegashira #3; 5–10	East Maegashira #10; 7–8	East Maegashira #11; 8–7	East Maegashira #9; 6–9	East Maegashira #12; 9–6	East Maegashira #8; 8–7
2020	East Maegashira #7; 7–8	East Maegashira #8; 4–11	West Maegashira #12; Tournament Cancelled; State of Emergency; 0–0–0	West Maegashira #12; 5–10	West Maegashira #15; 5–10	West Jūryō #2; 6–9
2021	East Jūryō #4; 5–10	West Jūryō #8; 8–7	East Jūryō #6; 8–7	West Jūryō #1; 5–10	East Jūryō #4; 10–5	West Maegashira #17; 4–11
2022	West Jūryō #3; 6–9	West Jūryō #6; 4–11	East Jūryō #12; 3–12	West Makushita #5; Retired –	x	x
Record given as wins–losses–absences Top division champion Top division runner-up Retired Lower divisions Non-participation Sanshō key: F=Fighting spirit; O=Outstanding performance; T=Technique Also shown: ★=Kinboshi; P=Playoff(s); Divisions: Makuuchi — Jūryō — Makushita — Sandanme — Jonidan — Jonokuchi Makuuchi ranks: Yokozuna — Ōzeki — Sekiwake — Komusubi — Maegashira

== See also ==
- List of sumo tournament top division runners-up
- List of sumo tournament second division champions
- Glossary of sumo terms
- List of past sumo wrestlers
- List of komusubi
