= Chiyomaru Kazuki =

Japanese sumo wrestler

Chiyomaru Kazuki 千代丸 一樹
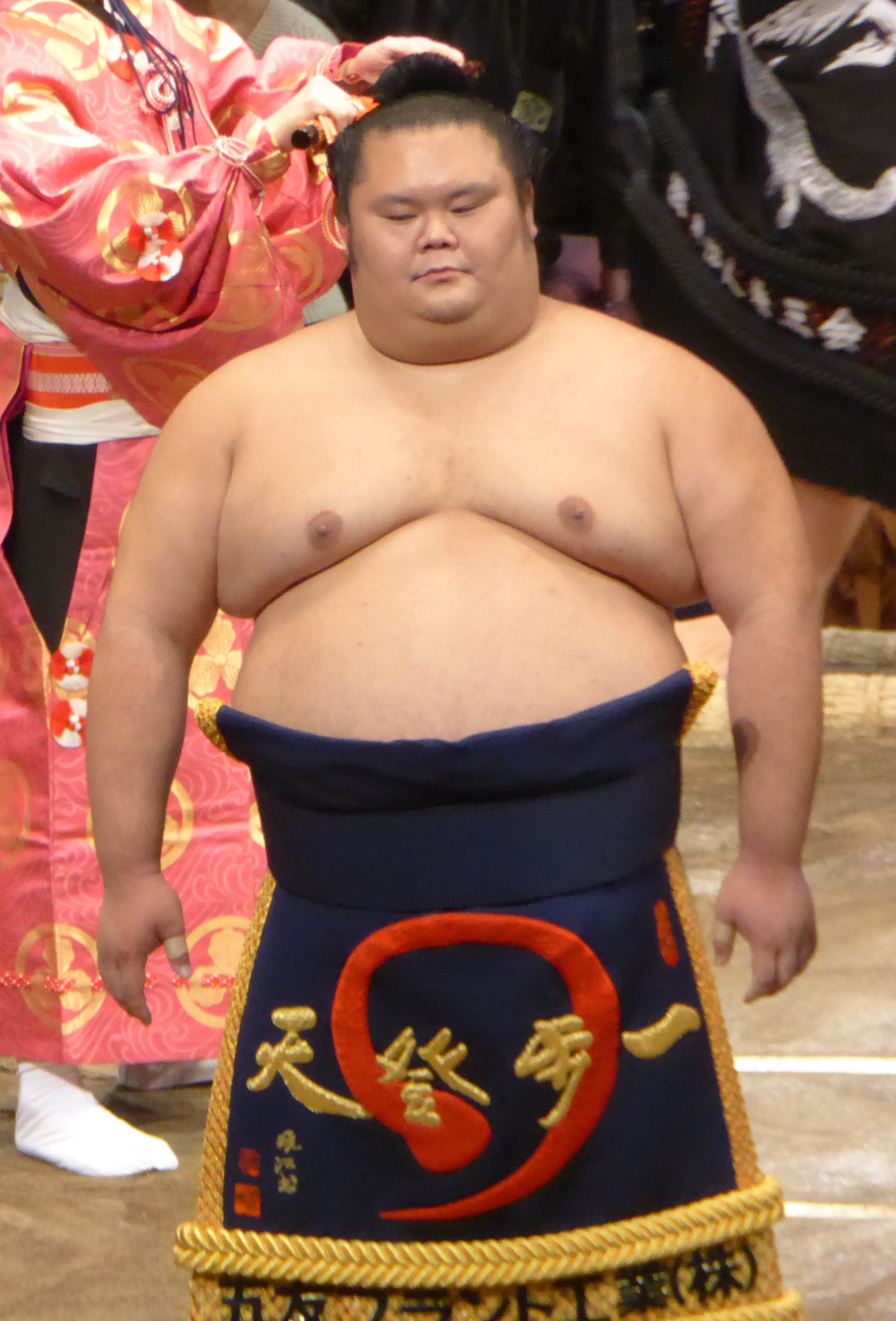
- Chiyomaru in 2017

Personal information
- Born: Kazuki Kinoshita; 17 April 1991 (age 35) Shibushi, Kagoshima, Japan
- Height: 1.79 m (5 ft 10 1/2 in)
- Weight: 171.4 kg (378 lb; 26.99 st)

Sport
- Sport: Sumo
- Rank: see below
- Retired: March 2026
- Heya: Kokonoe
- Debut: May 2007
- Highest rank: Maegashira 5 (March 2018)
- Championships: 1 (Jūryō)
- Updated on March 23, 2026

Chiyomaru Kazuki (Japanese: 千代丸 一樹; born April 17, 1991 as Kazuki Kinoshita (木下 一樹)) is a Japanese former professional sumo wrestler from Shibushi, Kagoshima. He made his professional debut in May 2007. He took the second division jūryō championship in his third tournament in the division in January 2014 and was promoted to the top makuuchi division in the following tournament. His highest rank has been maegashira 5 East. He is the older brother of fellow professional sumo wrestler Chiyoōtori, and has served as his younger brother's attendant or tsukebito.

== Early life and sumo background ==
Kazuki was born in what is now Shibushi city in Kagoshima prefecture. During his primary and middle school years he practiced judo rather than sumo. Upon graduating from a junior high school in Shibushi, he joined Kokonoe stable. His year and a half younger brother, Yūki, would follow him into this stable a year later.

== Career ==
He first entered the professional sumo ring in July 2007. He slowly worked his way up the ranks, and after two years and two months in the ring his shikona (ring name) was changed to Chiyomaru following the Kokonoe stable custom of giving wrestlers a ring name that starts with Chiyo upon promotion to the sandanme division. Chiyomaru was judged by his appearance of his big, round belly when given the shikona of Chiyomaru which literally means ‘Eternally round’ in Japanese. It would take him over four years rising slowly through the lower divisions before reaching the professional ranks of jūryō. During this time, in 2011 he and his brother's family home was lost in a fire and they agreed building their parents a new house could be motivation for them to achieve more success in sumo. Chiyomaru's coach, the former Chiyonofuji remarked that before his brother overtook him he lacked motivation and disliked training, and in many ways it was being passed up by his own brother that spurred him on to improve his sumo. To add insult to injury, when Chiyomaru's younger brother became a sekitori (a salaried wrestler) and in need of an attendant, his coach chose Chiyomaru in hopes of motivating him to try harder to make the professional ranks and divest himself of this role. Chiyomaru admits that the indignity of being his own brother's attendant did motivate him and he might not have achieved promotion if this hadn't happened.

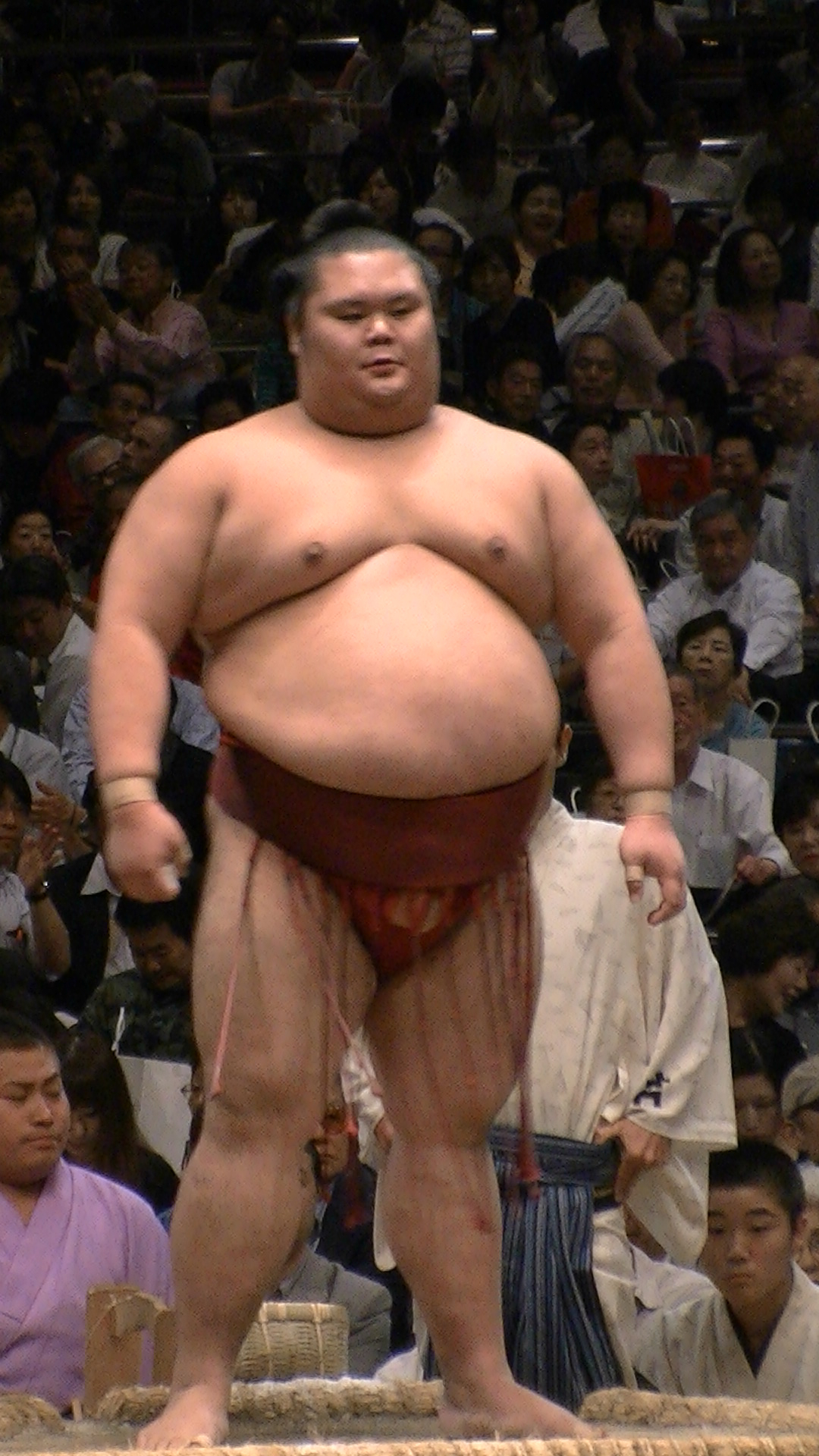
Chiyomaru in 2014

In July 2013 with a 4–3 record at makushita 1, he finally achieved promotion to jūryō for the following tournament. When he made his jūryō debut in September 2013 his brother, Chiyoōtori was already in the division, marking the 17th time in history that two brothers were in the professional ranks at the same time. He only managed a 7–8 losing record in his jūryō debut, but followed this with an impressive November tournament, winning 8 of his first 9 bouts and ending with an 11–4 record. In the January 2014 tournament, his success continued, and from the rank of jūryō 6 he logged in a 13–2 record and the championship. Coincidentally, this was the tournament immediately after his younger brother also won the jūryō division with a 13–2 record. This was the first time in history two brothers had achieved consecutive championships.

Chiyomaru's promotion to the top makuuchi division in March 2014 followed his brother's ascension by one tournament and marked the tenth time in history two brothers had been in the highest division at the same time. At an event celebrating his promotion he expressed his incredulity at this turn of events and surmised that perhaps even the two brothers sharing the rank of ōzeki in the future was not out of the range of possibility. In his debut at this level, he defeated several makuuchi veterans and accumulated an 8–4 record on the 12th day before losing his last three bouts to end at 8–7. In the following May tournament he was promoted to maegashira 11, his highest rank to date. He struggled however, losing to a number of wrestlers he had beaten in the previous tournament and logged in only a 5–10 record. This was still enough for him to remain in the top division for the July 2014 tournament. Though he won his first five matches he started to struggle somewhat afterwards, still managing to end the tournament with an 8–7 winning record.

After the May 2015 tournament Chiyomaru fell back to the jūryō division after scoring only three wins against twelve losses. He had to withdraw partway through the September 2015 tournament (with a sprained right acromioclavicular joint) and the January 2016 tournament (due to a knee injury). After a 12 tournament absence he returned to the top division for the July 2017 tournament. In March 2018 he reached his highest rank to date of maegashira 5, but five consecutive make-koshi or losing records saw him relegated to the jūryō division after the November 2018 tournament. After two straight 10–5 records in January and March 2019 he was promoted back to the top division for the May 2019 tournament in which he got a 7–8 record and got a 5–10 record in the July tournament which saw him drop down to East juryō 1 in the following September Tournament. He ended that tournament with an 8–7 score, which was enough to ensure he was promoted back to the top division for the next tournament. In November he recorded a 9–6 score, losing to Shimanoumi on the final day preventing him from achieving double digit wins for his first time in the top division.

He withdrew from the March 2020 tournament in Osaka, held without spectators due to the coronavirus outbreak, with a fever on Day 8. He agreed to a test for the coronavirus after his temperature was recorded at above 37.5C for two straight days, although it was suspected that the cause was a skin infection. On Day 10 of the tournament, Chiyomaru's test results came back as negative for the novel coronavirus. He was demoted back to jūryō after a 4–11 record in July 2020. Along with everyone else in Kokonoe stable he was forced to miss the January 2021 tournament due to a number of positive tests for COVID-19 at his stable. He returned with a 9–6 record in March which was enough to see him promoted back to makuuchi for the May 2021 tournament. In May he produced an 8-7 performance, his first kachi-koshi in the top division since November 2019. However, his final top division tournament would be in January 2023, after which he would spend the rest of his career bouncing between jūryō and makushita.

=== Retirement ===
At the November 2024 tournament, Chiyomaru, ranked jūryō 11, fought in his last tournament as a sekitori, winning only one of his 15 matches. He fought in makushita throughout 2025, though he could not make it back to jūryō. By the January 2026 tournament, Chiyomaru had fallen to sandanme, where he had not fought for 15 years.

On Day 12 of the March 2026 tournament, Chiyomaru stood out in his match against fellow former maegashira Niounoumi, who he had not fought since Day 13 of the 2013 Aki Basho, a gap of almost 13 years between meetings. He won the match to secure his fourth win of the tournament, giving him his first winning record in the sandanme division in 15 years and his first in four tournaments. Following the tournament, Chiyomaru announced his retirement from professional sumo. He intends to remain with the Sumo Association as a wakaimonogashira, or youth leader, meaning he will work with new recruits and organize maezumo.

== Fighting style ==
Chiyomaru relies heavily on pushing and thrusting techniques, or oshi-sumo, but is also very commonly seen winning by the hataki-komi slap down technique. His most common winning kimarite are oshi-dashi (push out), hiki-otoshi (pull down) and hataki-komi (slap down). He is at a disadvantage if his opponent manages to grab his mawashi or belt.

== Away from the dohyo ==
Chiyomaru is known for his cherub-like looks and is popular with female sumo fans or "rikijo." In 2014, a photo of him taking a nap, which was posted on the Japan Sumo Association's official Twitter account, became an internet hit.

In March 2015 he shook hands with Derek Jeter who was visiting the Osaka tournament, but admitted not knowing who the retired New York Yankees star was.

== Career record ==
Chiyomaru Kazuki
Year	January Hatsu basho, Tokyo	March Haru basho, Osaka	May Natsu basho, Tokyo	July Nagoya basho, Nagoya	September Aki basho, Tokyo	November Kyūshū basho, Fukuoka
2007	x	x	(Maezumo)	East Jonokuchi #36; 4–3	East Jonidan #127; 0–1–6	East Jonokuchi #32; 4–2–1
2008	West Jonidan #114; 3–4	West Jonidan #117; 5–2	West Jonidan #67; 3–4	West Jonidan #86; 3–4	East Jonidan #110; 5–2	East Jonidan #52; 5–2
2009	East Jonidan #15; 5–2	West Sandanme #81; 4–3	West Sandanme #61; 3–4	East Sandanme #80; 5–2	East Sandanme #51; 5–2	East Sandanme #26; 2–5
2010	East Sandanme #54; 5–2	East Sandanme #26; 4–3	West Sandanme #14; 3–4	West Sandanme #30; 4–3	West Sandanme #15; 5–2	East Makushita #54; 3–4
2011	West Sandanme #7; 4–3	East Makushita #57; Tournament Cancelled; Match fixing investigation 0–0–0	East Makushita #57; 5–2	East Makushita #28; 4–3	East Makushita #21; 5–2	East Makushita #13; 2–5
2012	East Makushita #24; 5–2	East Makushita #14; 4–3	East Makushita #10; 4–3	East Makushita #8; 0–1–6	West Makushita #48; 6–1	West Makushita #21; 6–1
2013	West Makushita #8; 5–2	West Makushita #2; 3–4	East Makushita #5; 5–2	East Makushita #1; 4–3	East Jūryō #13; 7–8	East Jūryō #13; 11–4
2014	East Jūryō #6; 13–2; Champion	East Maegashira #12; 8–7	West Maegashira #11; 5–10	West Maegashira #16; 8–7	East Maegashira #11; 4–11	West Maegashira #16; 8–7
2015	West Maegashira #14; 7–8	West Maegashira #16; 8–7	West Maegashira #13; 3–12	West Jūryō #5; 9–6	West Jūryō #1; 1–8–6	East Jūryō #14; 9–6
2016	West Jūryō #7; 5–6–4	West Jūryō #11; 7–8	East Jūryō #12; 9–6	East Jūryō #9; 10–5	East Jūryō #5; 8–7	East Jūryō #1; 6–9
2017	West Jūryō #3; 7–8	East Jūryō #4; 8–7	East Jūryō #2; 9–6	West Maegashira #15; 9–6	West Maegashira #11; 9–6	West Maegashira #8; 7–8
2018	West Maegashira #9; 9–6	East Maegashira #5; 6–9	West Maegashira #7; 5–10	East Maegashira #10; 5–10	West Maegashira #14; 6–9	West Maegashira #16; 4–11
2019	West Jūryō #6; 10–5	West Jūryō #1; 10–5	East Maegashira #13; 7–8	East Maegashira #13; 5–10	East Jūryō #1; 8–7	East Maegashira #13; 9–6
2020	West Maegashira #12; 6–9	West Maegashira #15; 7–6–2	West Maegashira #15; Tournament Cancelled; State of Emergency; 0–0–0	West Maegashira #15; 4–11	West Jūryō #3; 7–8	East Jūryō #4; 8–7
2021	East Jūryō #2; Sat out due to COVID rules 0–0–15	East Jūryō #3; 9–6	West Maegashira #16; 8–7	East Maegashira #13; 6–9	East Maegashira #16; 8–7	West Maegashira #15; 8–7
2022	East Maegashira #13; 7–8	East Maegashira #13; 5–10	East Jūryō #1; 8–7	West Maegashira #17; 6–9	West Jūryō #1; 7–8	West Jūryō #1; 8–7
2023	West Maegashira #16; 4–11	East Jūryō #4; 4–11	East Jūryō #10; 6–9	East Jūryō #11; 8–7	East Jūryō #10; 8–7	East Jūryō #8; 4–7–4
2024	East Jūryō #12; 5–10	East Makushita #1; 4–3	West Jūryō #13; 4–11	East Makushita #6; 4–3	West Makushita #3; 5–2	West Jūryō #11; 1–14
2025	East Makushita #10; 3–4	East Makushita #16; 4–3	East Makushita #11; 3–4	West Makushita #16; 4–3	East Makushita #11; 3–4	East Makushita #13; 2–5
2026	West Makushita #29; 1–6	West Sandanme #1; Retired; 4–3	x	x	x	x
Record given as wins–losses–absences Top division champion Top division runner-up Retired Lower divisions Non-participation Sanshō key: F=Fighting spirit; O=Outstanding performance; T=Technique Also shown: ★=Kinboshi; P=Playoff(s); Divisions: Makuuchi — Jūryō — Makushita — Sandanme — Jonidan — Jonokuchi Makuuchi ranks: Yokozuna — Ōzeki — Sekiwake — Komusubi — Maegashira

== See also ==
- List of sumo tournament second division champions
- Glossary of sumo terms
- List of past sumo wrestlers
