= Masunoyama Tomoharu =

Japanese sumo wrestler

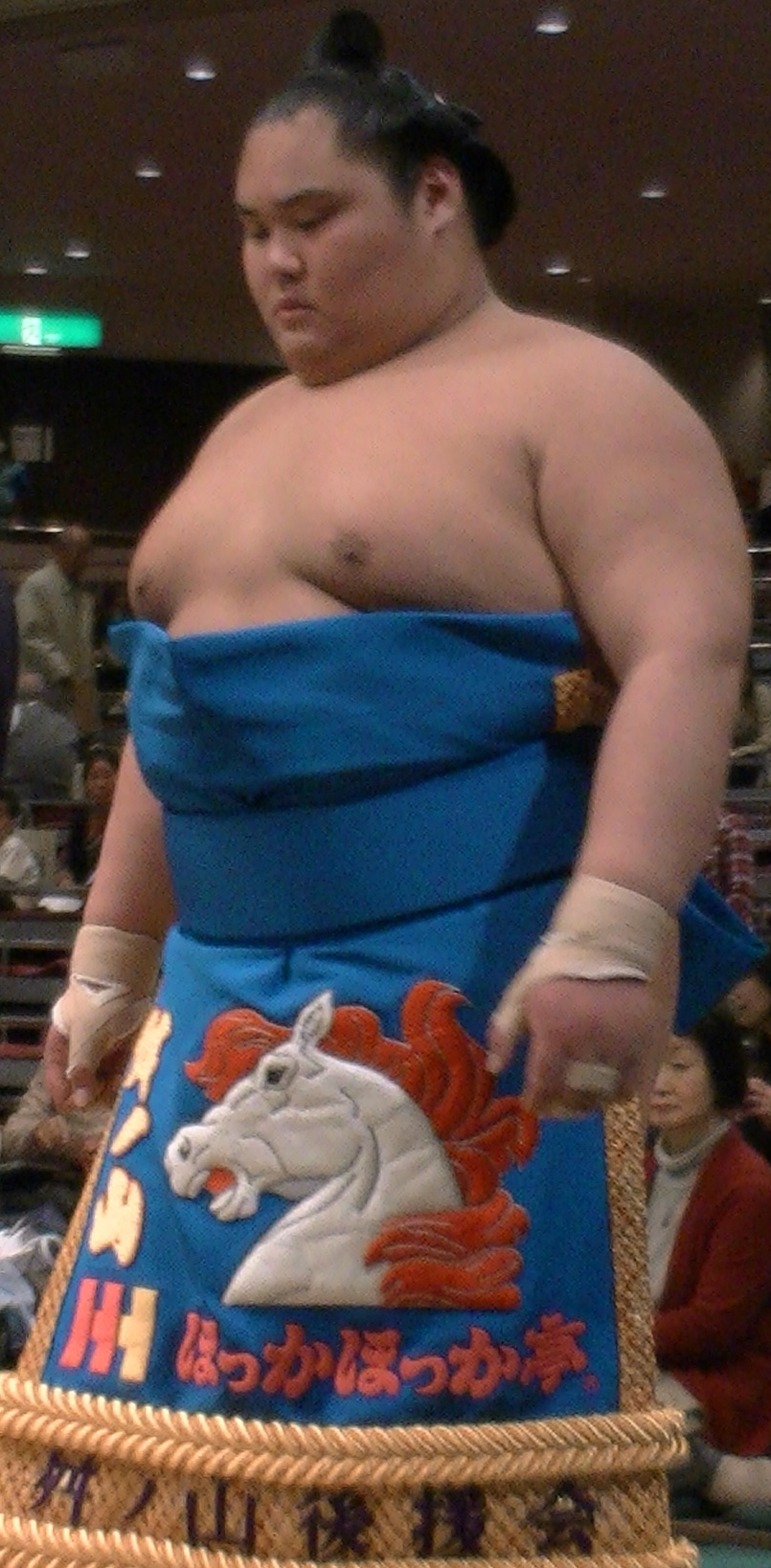
- Masunoyama in 2011

Personal information
- Native name: 舛乃山 大晴
- Born: Tomoharu Kato; 1 November 1990 (age 35) Iloilo City, Philippines
- Height: 1.81 m (5 ft 11 1/2 in)
- Weight: 176 kg (388 lb; 27.7 st)

Sport
- Sport: Sumo
- Retired: May, 2021
- Heya: Tokiwayama
- Record: 374-312-123
- Debut: July, 2006
- Highest rank: Maegashira #4 (Nov, 2012)
- Championships: 1 (Sandanme); 1 (Jonokuchi)
- Special Prizes: Fighting Spirit (1)
- Updated on May 21, 2021

Masunoyama Tomoharu (Japanese: 舛乃山 大晴; born November 1, 1990 as Tomoharu Kato (加藤 大晴)) is a Japanese former professional sumo wrestler from Sakae, Chiba. He turned professional in July 2006 and was the first wrestler born in the Heisei era to become a sekitori when he was promoted to the jūryō division in November 2010, alongside Takayasu. He reached the top makuuchi division in September 2011. He was injured in his top division debut and fell back to jūryō, but he returned in July 2012 and scored eleven wins, winning the Fighting Spirit Award. A serious knee injury sustained in 2015 resulted in him falling greatly in rank, and he was not able to return to sekitori status. He retired in May 2021.

== Early life and sumo background ==
He was born in Iloilo City in the Philippines to a Filipino mother and a Japanese father. His family moved to Japan when he was about one month old. His parents had always been fans of sumo and from a very young age he had aspired to be a sumo wrestler. He was a member of the sumo club at his primary school, and when his junior high school did not have a sumo club he decided to attend practice at an area high school and other locations so he could continue doing sumo. He participated and did very well in children's sumo and also in national amateur sumo tournaments. However, in his third year of junior high school his parents divorced and he moved back with his mother to her native Philippines. He graduated from junior high school there and in May 2006 returned to Japan. Still interested in sumo, he decided to join Chiganoura stable, now renamed Tokiwayama stable. The stable already had their foreigner slot filled by the Hungarian Masutoo, but as Masunoyama listed Chiba Prefecture as his place of birth on the banzuke ranking sheets, he is not regarded as a foreigner by the Japan Sumo Association.

== Career ==
He first stepped on the pro sumo dohyō in July 2006. Being a diligent trainer, and managing to avoid injury, he rose through the ranks and in a little over a year and half achieved his first championship at the rank of sandanme 46 with a 7–0 perfect record. It would take him another two and half years of mostly winning records to reach the second division jūryō in November 2010. He entered jūryō at the same time as Takayasu. Both had the distinction of being half Filipino as well as simultaneously being the first two wrestlers to enter jūryō that were born in the Heisei Era.

Masunoyama only managed a 6–9 score in his first jūryō tournament but as he had debuted at the relatively high rank of jūryō 11, he was spared relegation. In the January 2011 tournament, he won his first five bouts in a row, but on the sixth day in morning practice he injured a ligament in his right leg. He made the decision to continue competing, and managed to beat Kakizoe on that day. However, two days later he aggravated the injury in a bout against Daidō and was obliged to miss the next day and take a fusenpai. He then returned for two more days, both wins against veteran wrestlers Tamanoshima and Chiyohakuhō before losing again and re-aggravating his injury to miss the final two days. Through all this he still managed an 8–5 record with two absences. Three tournaments later (with one being missed due to the sumo match-fixing scandal), at the rank of jūryō 1 he came just short of a championship, but lost in a playoff to Myōgiryū who was in his jūryō debut. This record allowed Masunoyama to be promoted to the top-tier makuuchi for the following September tournament.

On the fourth day of his makuuchi debut in a bout against Tochinowaka Masunoyama injured the same ligament in his left leg that he had previously injured in his right leg. He was forced to bow out of the tournament with only a 2–3 record, and was demoted back to jūryō. Though advised by his doctor not to enter the next tournament in order to let his injury heal, he insisted on fighting on. However, unable to do much training and hobbled by his injury he had losing records in the following two tournaments. He returned to form in the next tournament in March 2012 and posted strong winning records in this and the following tournament. He re-entered makuuchi in July 2012, marking it with an 11–4 win and the Fighting Spirit prize. However he had two losing records to only one winning one for the remainder of the year. In 2013, he had a lackluster performance, recording mostly losing tournaments, but mostly records of 7–8 which kept him from falling too far down the ranks. This continued in 2014, and his unimpressive 4–11 score at maegashira 13 led to his relegation to the jūryō division in July.

His downward slide continued in 2015 and absence from the dohyō meant he had fallen to the bottom of the makushita division by September. After having surgery on his right knee for a dislocation and meniscus damage, he declared that he would enter the March 2016 tournament after a five basho absence. He was ranked in the jonidan division for this tournament and came through with a 6–1 record. He was promoted to the sandanme division for May 2016 but withdrew from that tournament after losing his first match. He sat out the July tournament with injury and was therefore demoted to jonokuchi, the lowest division. He is only the second wrestler with top division experience to fall to jonokuchi since the beginning of the Shōwa era – the other being Ryūhō in 2012. Finally back on the active list for the September 2016 tournament, easily took a 7–0 perfect record and the jonokuchi championship and secured a second successive promotion with a 6–1 in jonidan in November. He missed the January and March 2017 tournaments through injury, but entered the May tournament on Day 7 at jonidan 81 and secured a 4–0–3 winning record. In July he won all seven of his matches in the jonidan division, although he was defeated in a playoff for the championship. That month he changed the spelling of his shikona surname from 舛ノ山 to its current spelling. He was ranked at sandanme 49 in September 2017, his highest rank for two years, but turned in a make-koshi 3–4 record. He was promoted back to the makushita division for the March 2018 tournament, his first time in the third highest division since September 2015, only to see him injured again in May, causing him to also miss the July 2018 tournament and sending him back down the rankings. He continued to suffer injury problems and absences, falling to jonidan in May 2021. The Sumo Association announced his retirement during the May 2021 tournament.

== Family ==
In July 2006, Masunoyama was the only new recruit into professional sumo, which drew significant media attention. Media interest continued due to his public personality, work ethic and resilience. He has also been interviewed on several television programs, where he demonstrated his singing ability.

He has said in interviews that he feels indebted to his mother for raising him on her own, and he sends money to her in the Philippines. He expressed hope to one day buy her a house.

Earlier in his sumo career, Masunoyama had initially been advised by a doctor that he had heart disease and should be careful not to overstrain himself; this also appeared to reflect in his sumo, where after an initial spurt of energy at the tachi-ai he would collapse after around 20 seconds from exhaustion. Eventually however, the coach at his stable insisted on a second opinion and a thorough heart examination was conducted which found no evidence of a heart condition.

Masunoyama's brother works in Chiganoura stable as a tokoyama or hairdresser.

== Fighting style ==
Masunoyama went on the offensive right from the tachi–ai or initial charge, using pushing and thrusting techniques (tsuki/oshi). Nearly half of all his victories were by either yorikiri, the force out, or oshi dashi, the push out.

== Career record ==
Masunoyama Tomoharu
Year	January Hatsu basho, Tokyo	March Haru basho, Osaka	May Natsu basho, Tokyo	July Nagoya basho, Nagoya	September Aki basho, Tokyo	November Kyūshū basho, Fukuoka
2006	x	x	x	(Maezumo)	West Jonokuchi #35; 6–1	East Jonidan #71; 6–1
2007	East Jonidan #1; 3–4	West Jonidan #22; 5–2	West Sandanme #88; 5–2	East Sandanme #51; 4–3	East Sandanme #35; 4–3	East Sandanme #19; 3–4
2008	West Sandanme #34; 3–4	West Sandanme #46; 7–0; Champion	East Makushita #28; 1–6	East Makushita #57; 4–3	West Makushita #47; 2–5	West Sandanme #5; 4–3
2009	West Makushita #56; 5–2	East Makushita #40; 2–5	East Makushita #55; 6–1	East Makushita #25; 2–5	East Makushita #39; 4–3	West Makushita #32; 3–4
2010	East Makushita #38; 4–3	West Makushita #32; 4–3	East Makushita #25; 6–1	East Makushita #9; 4–3	East Makushita #3; 5–2	West Jūryō #11; 6–9
2011	West Jūryō #14; 8–5–2	Tournament Cancelled; 0–0–0	East Jūryō #9; 9–6	East Jūryō #1; 11–4–P	East Maegashira #9; 2–3–10	West Jūryō #2; 7–8
2012	West Jūryō #3; 6–9	East Jūryō #7; 10–5	West Jūryō #1; 9–6	West Maegashira #13; 11–4; F	West Maegashira #6; 8–7	West Maegashira #4; 5–10
2013	West Maegashira #7; 4–11	West Maegashira #12; 7–8	West Maegashira #13; 7–8	East Maegashira #14; 7–8	East Maegashira #14; 8–7	East Maegashira #11; 6–5–4
2014	West Maegashira #14; 7–8	West Maegashira #14; 8–7	East Maegashira #13; 4–11	East Jūryō #2; 5–10	West Jūryō #7; 1–4–10	West Makushita #5; 4–3
2015	West Jūryō #14; 9–6	East Jūryō #10; 5–10	East Makushita #1; 1–3–2	East Makushita #20; Sat out due to injury 0–0–7	West Makushita #60; Sat out due to injury 0–0–7	West Sandanme #40; Sat out due to injury 0–0–7
2016	West Sandanme #100; Sat out due to injury 0–0–7	East Jonidan #61; 6–1	East Sandanme #93; 0–1–6	West Jonidan #43; Sat out due to injury 0–0–7	East Jonokuchi #11; 7–0; Champion	East Jonidan #11; 6–1
2017	East Sandanme #50; Sat out due to injury 0–0–7	West Jonidan #10; Sat out due to injury 0–0–7	East Jonidan #81; 4–0–3	East Jonidan #49; 7–0–P	East Sandanme #49; 3–4	West Sandanme #63; 4–3
2018	West Sandanme #45; 6–1	West Makushita #56; 5–2	West Makushita #38; 0–2–5	West Sandanme #13; Sat out due to injury 0–0–7	East Sandanme #74; 6–1	East Sandanme #18; 4–3
2019	East Sandanme #7; 4–3	East Makushita #57; 4–3	East Makushita #49; 6–1	West Makushita #21; 0–4–3	West Makushita #56; 3–4	East Sandanme #7; 3–3–1
2020	East Sandanme #27; 3–4	West Sandanme #45; 5–2	East Sandanme #17; Tournament Cancelled; 0–0–0	East Sandanme #17; 4–3	West Sandanme #4; 3–3–1	West Sandanme #17; 4–3
2021	West Sandanme #4; 0–1–6	West Sandanme #54; Sat out due to injury 0–0–7	East Jonidan #14; Retired; 0–0–7	x	x	x
Record given as wins–losses–absences Top division champion Top division runner-up Retired Lower divisions Non-participation Sanshō key: F=Fighting spirit; O=Outstanding performance; T=Technique Also shown: ★=Kinboshi; P=Playoff(s); Divisions: Makuuchi — Jūryō — Makushita — Sandanme — Jonidan — Jonokuchi Makuuchi ranks: Yokozuna — Ōzeki — Sekiwake — Komusubi — Maegashira

== See also ==
- Glossary of sumo terms
- List of past sumo wrestlers
