= Tochinowaka Michihiro =

Japanese sumo wrestler (born 1988)

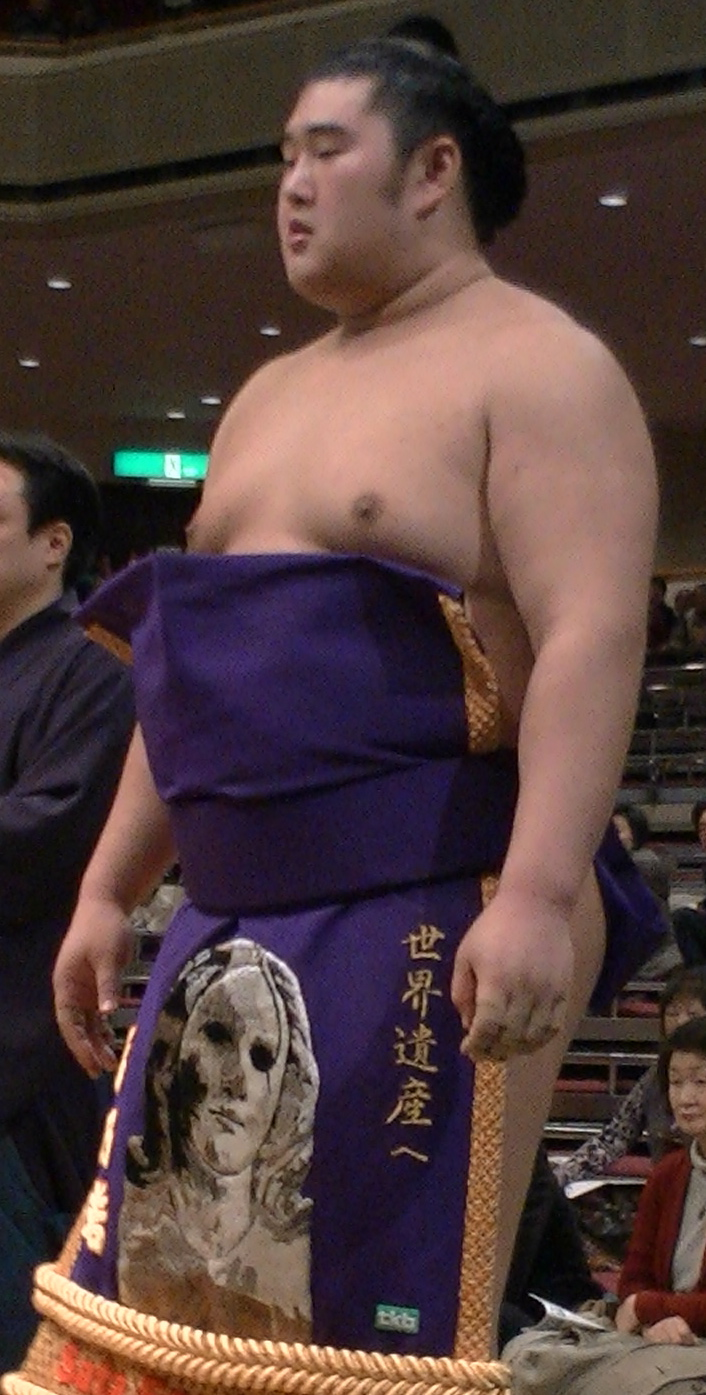

Personal information
- Native name: 栃乃若 導大
- Born: Dae Won Lee; April 6, 1988 (age 38) Amagasaki, Hyogo, Japan
- Height: 1.96 m (6 ft 5 in)
- Weight: 177 kg (390 lb; 27.9 st)

Sport
- Sport: Sumo
- Retired: January, 2015
- Heya: Kasugano
- Record: 267-244-11
- Debut: January, 2007
- Highest rank: Maegashira 1 (March, 2012)
- Updated on Dec 24, 2014

Tochinowaka Michihiro (born Dae Won Lee on April 6, 1988) is a former sumo wrestler from Hyogo, Japan. His father is a Zainichi Korean and his mother is a Korean immigrant. He made his professional debut in 2007 and steadily rose through the ranks. His highest rank was maegashira 1.

== Early life and sumo background ==
Lee was active in judo and also began doing sumo in his second year of primary school. In his third year at Hōtoku Gakuen High School he achieved the status of national high school yokozuna.

== Career ==
He entered professional sumo as a wrestler for Kasugano stable in the 2007 January tournament. After posting a strong 5–2 record in his first official tournament, he achieved a perfect 7–0 record to face fellow up and coming wrestler Yamamotoyama to whom he lost the playoff bout for the jonidan championship or yūshō. Promoted to sandanme in the following tournament, he posted a 6–1 record and a 5–1 record in the following tournament, garnering him promotion to makushita.

He continued fulfilling the expectations of a former high school yokozuna with four consecutive kachi-koshi or winning records. However, upon reaching upper makushita his progress slowed and he finally posted a make-koshi or losing record of 2–5, his first such record in nine tournaments in sumo. In the next tournament he only achieved a 3–4, marking the only time so far in his sumo career that he has had consecutive losing records. It was during this period of struggle that he changed to his current shikona or ring name of Tochinowaka, which is the former ring name of his stable coach, Tochinowaka Kiyotaka. His ring name up to this time had been his simple one character Korean family name of 李 or Lee. This had apparently been somewhat of a challenge for the yobidashi who are required to announce every wrestler's name in a drawn out singsong style of voice and very rarely, if ever, had to call out a ring name consisting of just one syllable.

His fortunes after his name change did not change right away, and after several tournaments alternating between winning and losing records, with an early withdrawal in the March 2009 tournament, he finally achieved two consecutive winning records in upper makushita to grant him promotion to sekitori level, the second highest jūryō division. In contrast to his struggles previously, he soared through jūryō in just three tournaments, narrowly losing the championship in playoffs in two consecutive tournaments.

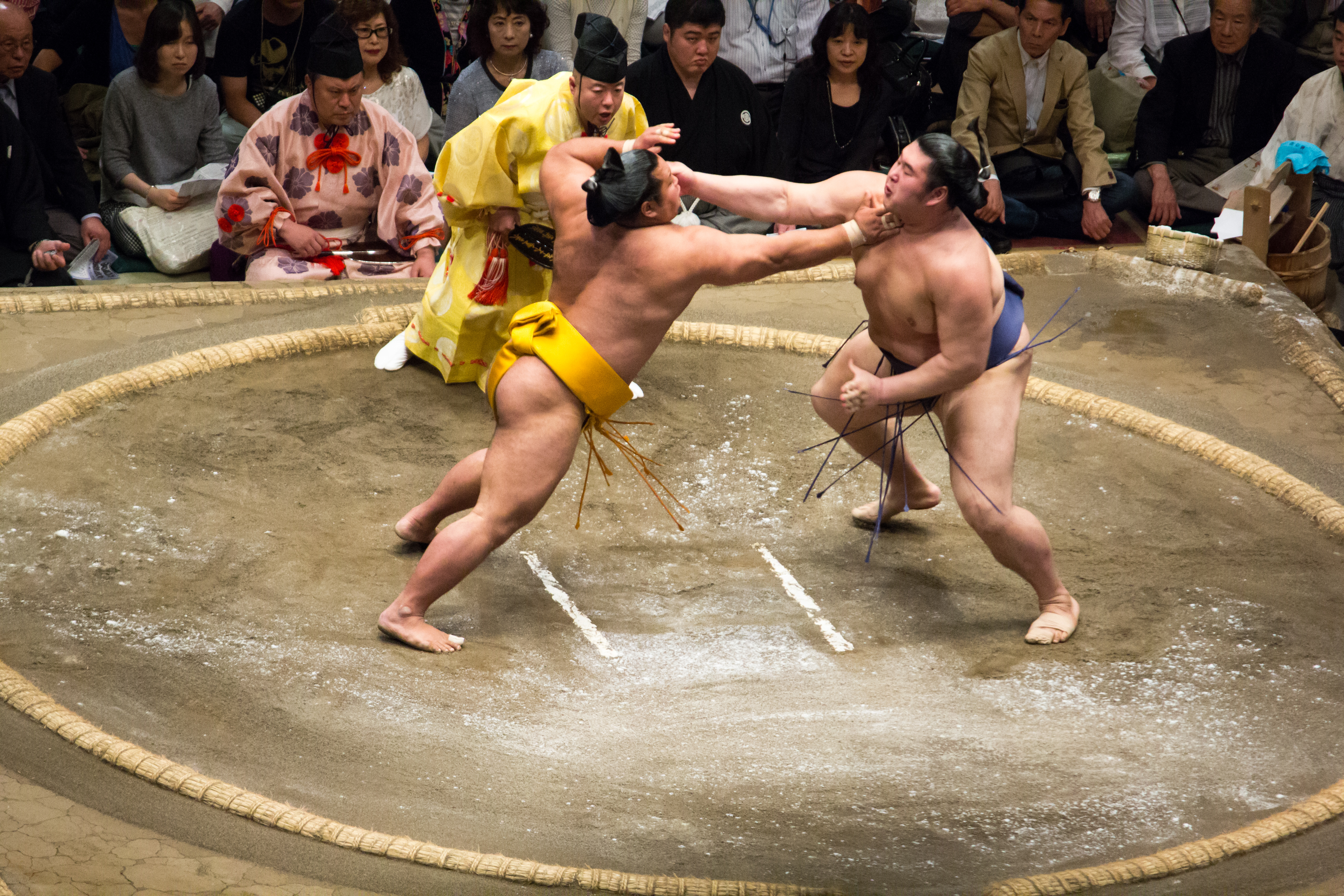
Tochinowaka fights Shōhōzan in the May 2014 tournament

His promotion to the top makuuchi division in March 2011 was ill-timed as this tournament was cancelled, the first such cancellation in the history of sumo, due to the bout fixing scandal of that year. Though there was no tournament and no official banzuke, he and fellow makuuchi promotee Kaisei did receive compensation as top division wrestlers for the period of that tournament. He only managed a 7–8 record in the following May "technical examination tournament" but in March 2012 he reached his highest rank to date, maegashira 1. In his first tournament facing all the top ranked men he managed to defeat ōzeki Kisenosato on the opening day, but his only other win over a san'yaku wrestler was sekiwake Aminishiki, and he finished on 5–10. Ranked at maegashira 4 in the May 2012 tournament he had a much easier schedule, facing only fellow maegashira, but he performed well below expectations posting only a 2–13 record. He was demoted from the top division after winning only five bouts at maegashira 14 in July. He managed to fight back after two tournaments and was again promoted to makuuchi in January 2013. However, the following March tournament, he dropped out from injury after losing his first seven bouts. He again fell back to jūryō and was again repromoted after two tournaments. Since then he alternated winning and losing tournaments, moving him up and down the maegashira ranks with regularity.

== Retirement from sumo ==
After the November 2014 tournament, with only a 3–12 record at a low maegashira rank, he faced demotion to jūryō. Following the winter tour he told his stablemaster Kasugano Oyakata that he wished to retire. Kasugano was surprised and talked with him for four hours in an effort to change his mind, but in the end submitted the official retirement papers to the Sumo Association on December 15, 2014. Tochinowaka's name appeared on the January 2015 banzuke despite his retirement. In interviews Tochinowaka revealed that he had been contemplating retirement for two years and had consulted his parents. He did not give any physical injuries as a reason for his retirement but indicated that he suffered from a lack of mental toughness. His retirement ceremony was held on January 25, 2015, at the Tokyo Metropolitan Hotel.

Following his retirement, he joined the Hakuju Bioscience Research Institute, which handles healthcare equipment and food, and he currently provides healthcare guidance as the manager of Hakuju Plaza.

== Family ==
His father is Zainichi Korean and his mother is a Korean immigrant. Tochinowaka was born and raised in Japan, enabling Kasugano stable to accept him despite already having a foreigner, Georgian Tochinoshin.

== Fighting style ==
Tochinowaka was a yotsu sumo wrestler who preferred techniques involving grabbing the opponent's mawashi. His favourite grip was hidari-yotsu, with his right hand outside and left hand inside his opponent's arms. Nearly half his career victories to date were achieved with just two kimarite or techniques, yori-kiri (force out) and oshi-dashi (push out), the two most common in sumo.

== Career record ==
Tochinowaka Michihiro
Year	January Hatsu basho, Tokyo	March Haru basho, Osaka	May Natsu basho, Tokyo	July Nagoya basho, Nagoya	September Aki basho, Tokyo	November Kyūshū basho, Fukuoka
2007	(Maezumo)	West Jonokuchi #32; 5–2	West Jonidan #94; 7–0–P	West Sandanme #80; 6–1	East Sandanme #23; 5–2	East Makushita #58; 5–2
2008	West Makushita #38; 5–2	East Makushita #22; 5–2	West Makushita #13; 4–3	West Makushita #10; 2–5	East Makushita #23; 3–4	West Makushita #28; 4–3
2009	East Makushita #21; 6–1	West Makushita #7; 1–3–3	East Makushita #24; 4–3	West Makushita #18; 1–6	West Makushita #40; 5–2	West Makushita #29; 6–1
2010	West Makushita #11; 5–2	East Makushita #6; 3–4	East Makushita #11; 6–1	West Makushita #4; 4–3	East Jūryō #13; 8–7	East Jūryō #10; 11–4–P
2011	West Jūryō #2; 12–3–P	Tournament Cancelled; 0–0–0	West Maegashira #11; 7–8	West Maegashira #11; 8–7	West Maegashira #7; 9–6	East Maegashira #4; 7–8
2012	West Maegashira #4; 8–7	West Maegashira #1; 5–10	West Maegashira #4; 2–13	East Maegashira #14; 5–10	West Jūryō #2; 5–10	East Jūryō #7; 13–2
2013	East Maegashira #15; 8–7	East Maegashira #13; 0–7–8	East Jūryō #8; 10–5	West Jūryō #3; 10–5	West Maegashira #11; 9–6	West Maegashira #4; 4–11
2014	West Maegashira #8; 9–6	West Maegashira #2; 4–11	West Maegashira #10; 9–6	East Maegashira #7; 5–10	West Maegashira #9; 4–11	East Maegashira #15; 3–12
2015	West Jūryō #6; Retired –	x	x	x	x	x
Record given as wins–losses–absences Top division champion Top division runner-up Retired Lower divisions Non-participation Sanshō key: F=Fighting spirit; O=Outstanding performance; T=Technique Also shown: ★=Kinboshi; P=Playoff(s); Divisions: Makuuchi — Jūryō — Makushita — Sandanme — Jonidan — Jonokuchi Makuuchi ranks: Yokozuna — Ōzeki — Sekiwake — Komusubi — Maegashira

== See also ==
- Glossary of sumo terms
- List of past sumo wrestlers
