= Chiyoōtori Yūki =

Japanese sumo wrestler

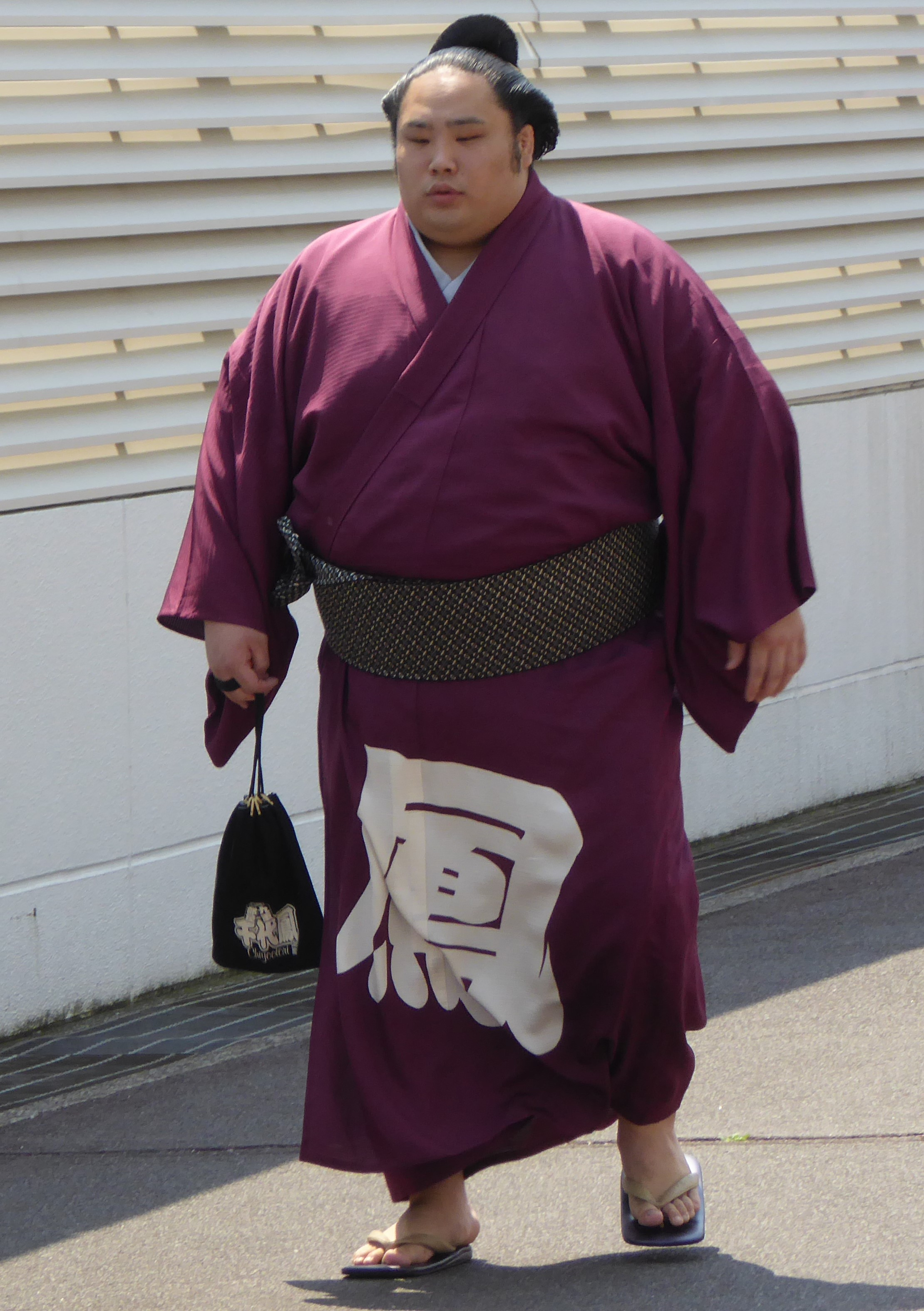
- Chiyoōtori in 2016

Personal information
- Native name: 千代鳳 祐樹
- Born: Kinoshita Yūki; 11 October 1992 (age 34) Shibushi, Kagoshima, Japan
- Height: 1.78 m (5 ft 10 in)
- Weight: 177 kg (390 lb)

Sport
- Sport: Sumo
- Retired: November, 2021
- Heya: Kokonoe
- Record: 430-363-104
- Debut: May, 2008
- Highest rank: Komusubi (May, 2014)
- Elder name: Nishikijima
- Championships: 1 (Jūryō); 1 (Jonidan)
- Updated on 7 November 2022

Chiyoōtori Yūki (Japanese: 千代鳳 祐樹; born 11 October 1992 as Yūki Kinoshita (木下 祐樹)) is a Japanese former professional sumo wrestler from Shibushi, Kagoshima. He made his professional debut in 2008, he reached the komusubi rank in 2014. He is the younger brother of fellow professional sumo wrestler Chiyomaru. He retired in 2021 to become an elder of the Japan Sumo Association. He is a member of Kokonoe stable.

== Early life and sumo background ==
As a youngster and student, Kinoshita was active in swimming and also judo, in which he has a black belt. However, he also participated in sumo less regularly, and in his sixth year of primary school he reached the best sixteen in a national children's amateur sumo tournament. He had visited a Kokonoe stable event in Kyūshū in his primary school years, and his older brother Chiyomaru was already a wrestler with the stable, so upon his graduation from middle school an invitation was arranged through intermediaries and he joined his brother as a member of this stable.

== Career ==
He joined Kokonoe stable in May 2008. He did well from this period, recording all winning tournaments. However, in November of this year he suffered a cruciate ligaments rupture. This serious injury forced him to miss most of the next several tournaments, but he was back in full form by the July 2009 tournament. He was back to his winning ways and after a 6–1 in his first tournament back in the jonokuchi division, he took the championship in the following September 2009 tournament in jonidan with a 7–0 perfect record. It is a tradition that Kokonoe wrestlers adopt a ring name on their promotion to sandanme division. Kinoshita did this, and also following the additional Kokonoe tradition that its wrestler's ring names begin with Chiyo, he took the ring name of Chiyoōtori. He would struggle for a year and a half in sandanme but on his promotion to the third division makushita in January 2011 he found his stride, taking mostly winning tournaments.

In November 2011 in the tournament in his home prefecture of Kyūshū, he had a 6–1 record and participated in a three-man playoff for the championship, losing only in the very last playoff match to rival Senshō. In the subsequent January 2012 tournament, he would repeat exactly the same feat, a 3-man makushita playoff, only losing the final bout to future top division wrestler Jōkōryū, then known as Sakumayama. Though he lost both playoffs, these two tournament records and playoffs were more than enough to propel him into the salaried ranks of jūryō for the March 2012 tournament. He was the first wrestler since the former Wakanohō in the November 2006 to achieve jūryō promotion in his teens.

He spent a little over a year in jūryō, alternating winning and losing tournaments, including the November 2012 tournament where he had to drop out due to injury after logging 7 wins. He bounced back from injury and achieved two 10–5 records in the January and March tournaments of 2013. His first promotion to the top division makuuchi in May 2013 would be short lived, as he managed only a 6–9 record at maegashira 14 and was relegated back to jūryō. He would soon find his footing again, and in his third tournament back in jūryō in November 2013, he took the championship at the rank of jūryō 2.

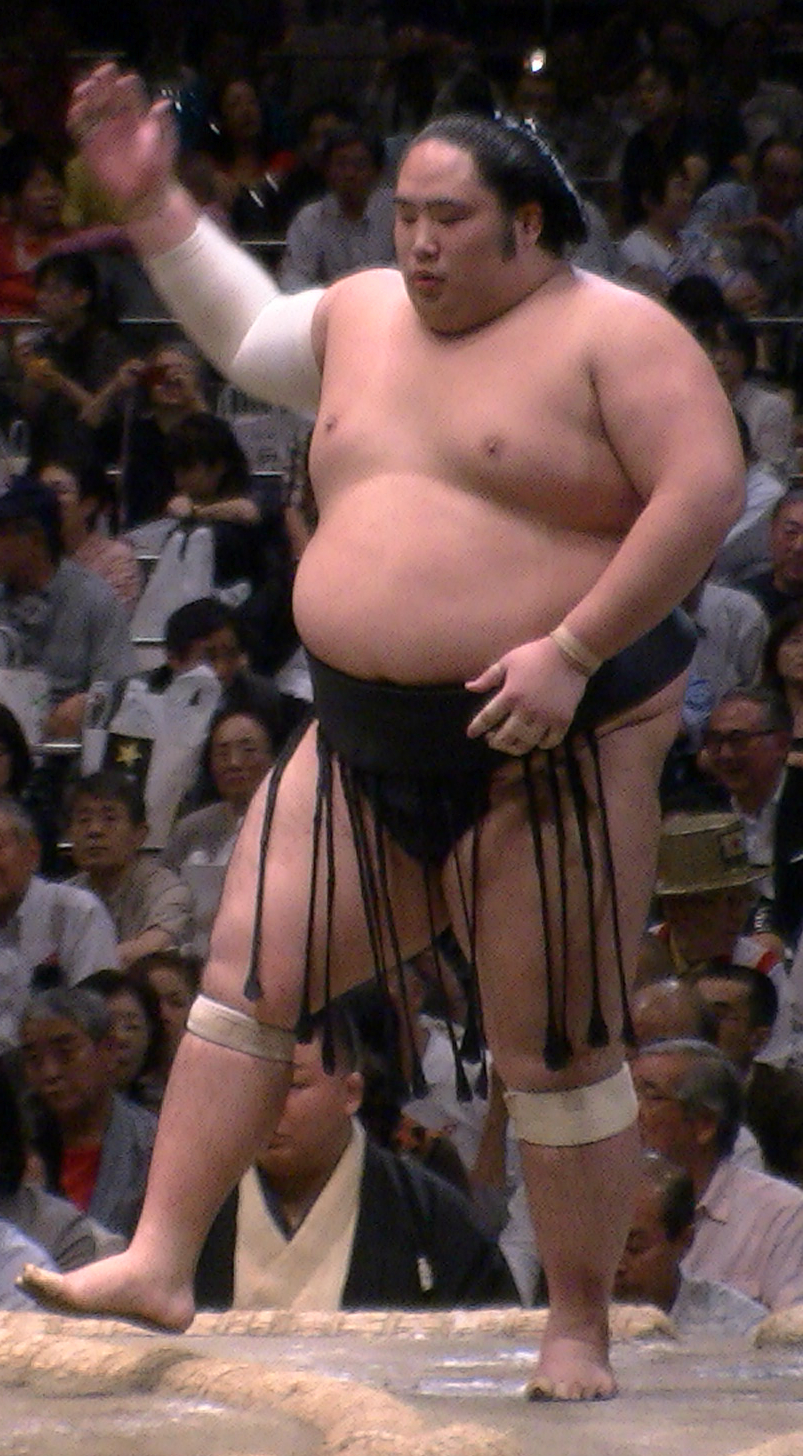
Chiyoōtori in 2014

Chiyoōtori was promoted to makuuchi for the second time in the subsequent January 2014 tournament. Coincidentally this was the same tournament that his older brother Chiyomaru would win the jūryō championship. An impressive record of 10–5 at maegashira 12 would elevate him to the rank of maegashira 5 for following March 2014 tournament, the same tournament at which Chiyomaru would get his own first promotion to the top division. In this tournament Chiyoōtori received a 9–6 record guaranteeing promotion to a higher rank and Chiyomaru would receive an 8–7 in his debut. This was the first time that two brothers had both been in makuuchi at the same time since May 2008, and the first time brothers had both achieved winning records in makuuchi since May 2007.

In the following tournament, Chiyoōtori made his san'yaku debut at the komusubi rank. He managed a 5–10 rank and though this would lead to a demotion, it is actually considered a decent record by many for a debut at such a challenging rank: komusubi are usually expected to be matched against all the higher ranked san'yaku wrestlers. He defeated newly promoted yokozuna Kakuryū on the seventh day, his first victory over a yokozuna, but did not get a kinboshi for the win as these are only awarded to maegashira ranked wrestlers.

He was injured during the May 2015 tournament and had to withdraw, resulting in demotion to jūryō. After a 9–6 record in July, he returned to the top division for the September 2015 tournament. He slowly moved up the rankings and had reached maegashira 4 by September 2016, but withdrew with a recurrence of an old knee injury on Day 11, having already lost nine of his first ten bouts. He was demoted to jūryō after the January 2017 tournament. In the following March tournament in Osaka he dislocated his shoulder on the sixth day and withdrew from competition. After three consecutive scores of 7–8 he missed the November 2017 tournament with his medical certificate citing a right shoulder dislocation and an anterior cruciate ligament injury to his left knee. The January 2018 tournament saw Chiyoōtori ranked in makushita for the first time in six years, and he withdrew from the tournament having failed to recover sufficiently from his injuries. In the March 2018 tournament he scored only 3–4 from makushita 49, his tenth consecutive make-koshi or losing score, meaning he fell from maegashira 4 to sandanme division in less than two years. However, he finally reversed course with two consecutive 5–2 records in the May and July 2018 tournaments followed by two more winning tournaments to close out 2018. He produced a 4–3 record at the rank of Makushita 1 West in November 2019, which returned him to the jūryō division for the first time in two years. In March 2020 he achieved his first kachi-koshi as a sekitori since July 2016.

On the day before the scheduled start of the January 2021 tournament, it was announced that Chiyoōtori had tested positive for COVID-19. He, and all of the other members of Kokonoe stable, subsequently withdrew from that tournament.

== Retirement from sumo ==
Chiyoōtori announced his retirement in November 2021. He stayed in sumo as an elder of the Japan Sumo Association and as a coach at his stable under the name of Sanoyama.

Chiyoōtori's retirement ceremony was held inside a hall at the Ryōgoku Kokugikan on 5 October 2022. In an unusual twist made at Chiyoōtori's request, twenty members of the general public who each paid ¥30,000 for a seat to the ceremony were all allowed to take part in the snipping of Chiyoōtori's topknot.

In November 2022 he switched elder names, assuming the Oyama name vacated by the former Daihi who retired from the Sumo Association. In May 2025, he changed his elder name again, acquiring the name Nishikijima, left vacant by the former Shōtenrō.

== Fighting style ==
Like his brother, Chiyoōtori favoured pushing and thrusting techniques (tsuki/oshi) over those that involve grabbing the opponent's mawashi or belt. Yori-kiri (force out) and oshi-dashi (push out), the two most common kimarite in sumo, account for sixty percent of his career wins.

== Personal life ==
In December 2021 he married a 21-year-old from Osaka, after a three-year relationship.

== Career record ==
Chiyoōtori Yūki
| Year | January Hatsu basho, Tokyo | March Haru basho, Osaka | May Natsu basho, Tokyo | July Nagoya basho, Nagoya | September Aki basho, Tokyo | November Kyūshū basho, Fukuoka |
|---|---|---|---|---|---|---|
| 2008 | x | x | (Maezumo) | West Jonokuchi #37; 6–1 | West Jonidan #76; 4–2–1 | East Jonidan #45; 3–2–2 |
| 2009 | East Jonidan #71; Sat out due to injury 0–0–7 | East Jonokuchi #17; 1–0–6 | West Jonokuchi #12; 1–0–6 | West Jonokuchi #23; 6–1 | West Jonidan #59; 7–0; Champion | East Sandanme #59; 6–1 |
| 2010 | West Sandanme #6; 3–4 | East Sandanme #17; 3–4 | East Sandanme #32; 5–2 | East Sandanme #9; 2–5 | West Sandanme #35; 5–2 | West Sandanme #8; 6–1 |
| 2011 | East Makushita #32; 3–4 | West Makushita #39; Tournament Cancelled; Match fixing investigation 0–0–0 | West Makushita #39; 6–1 | East Makushita #12; 3–4 | East Makushita #15; 5–2 | West Makushita #7; 6–1–P |
| 2012 | West Makushita #1; 6–1–P | East Jūryō #11; 9–6 | West Jūryō #8; 6–9 | West Jūryō #11; 10–5 | East Jūryō #5; 7–8 | East Jūryō #6; 7–2–6 |
| 2013 | East Jūryō #8; 10–5 | West Jūryō #3; 10–5 | West Maegashira #14; 6–9 | West Jūryō #1; 6–6–3 | East Jūryō #5; 10–5 | East Jūryō #2; 13–2; Champion |
| 2014 | West Maegashira #12; 10–5 | East Maegashira #5; 9–6 | West Komusubi; 5–10 | East Maegashira #5; 6–9 | West Maegashira #7; 8–7 | East Maegashira #5; 6–9 |
| 2015 | West Maegashira #7; 5–8–2 | East Maegashira #12; 11–4 | East Maegashira #4; 0–2–13 | East Jūryō #1; 9–6 | West Maegashira #12; 6–9 | West Maegashira #15; 10–5 |
| 2016 | East Maegashira #10; 5–7–3 | East Maegashira #13; 8–7 | East Maegashira #11; 8–7 | East Maegashira #8; 9–6 | West Maegashira #4; 1–10–4 | West Maegashira #12; 6–9 |
| 2017 | East Maegashira #14; 6–9 | East Jūryō #1; 3–4–8 | East Jūryō #9; 7–8 | East Jūryō #10; 7–8 | West Jūryō #10; 7–8 | East Jūryō #11; Sat out due to injury 0–0–15 |
| 2018 | West Makushita #9; Sat out due to injury 0–0–7 | West Makushita #49; 3–4 | East Sandanme #3; 5–2 | East Makushita #41; 5–2 | East Makushita #25; 4–3 | East Makushita #21; 5–2 |
| 2019 | West Makushita #12; 2–5 | East Makushita #26; 6–1 | East Makushita #10; 5–2 | East Makushita #4; 3–4 | West Makushita #7; 5–2 | West Makushita #1; 4–3 |
| 2020 | East Jūryō #13; 6–9 | East Jūryō #14; 9–6 | West Jūryō #8; Tournament Cancelled; State of Emergency; 0–0–0 | West Jūryō #8; 7–8 | West Jūryō #9; 9–6 | East Jūryō #7; 8–7 |
| 2021 | West Jūryō #5; Sat out due to COVID rules 0–0–15 | West Jūryō #6; 4–11 | West Jūryō #10; 0–9–6 | East Makushita #7; 4–3 | East Makushita #3; 2–5 | East Makushita #12; Retired; 1–6 |
Record given as wins–losses–absences Top division champion Top division runner-up Retired Lower divisions Non-participation Sanshō key: F=Fighting spirit; O=Outstanding performance; T=Technique Also shown: ★=Kinboshi; P=Playoff(s); Divisions: Makuuchi — Jūryō — Makushita — Sandanme — Jonidan — Jonokuchi Makuuchi ranks: Yokozuna — Ōzeki — Sekiwake — Komusubi — Maegashira

== See also ==
- Glossary of sumo terms
- List of past sumo wrestlers
- List of komusubi
- List of sumo tournament second division champions
- List of sumo elders
