= Tokushinhō Motohisa =

Japanese sumo wrestler

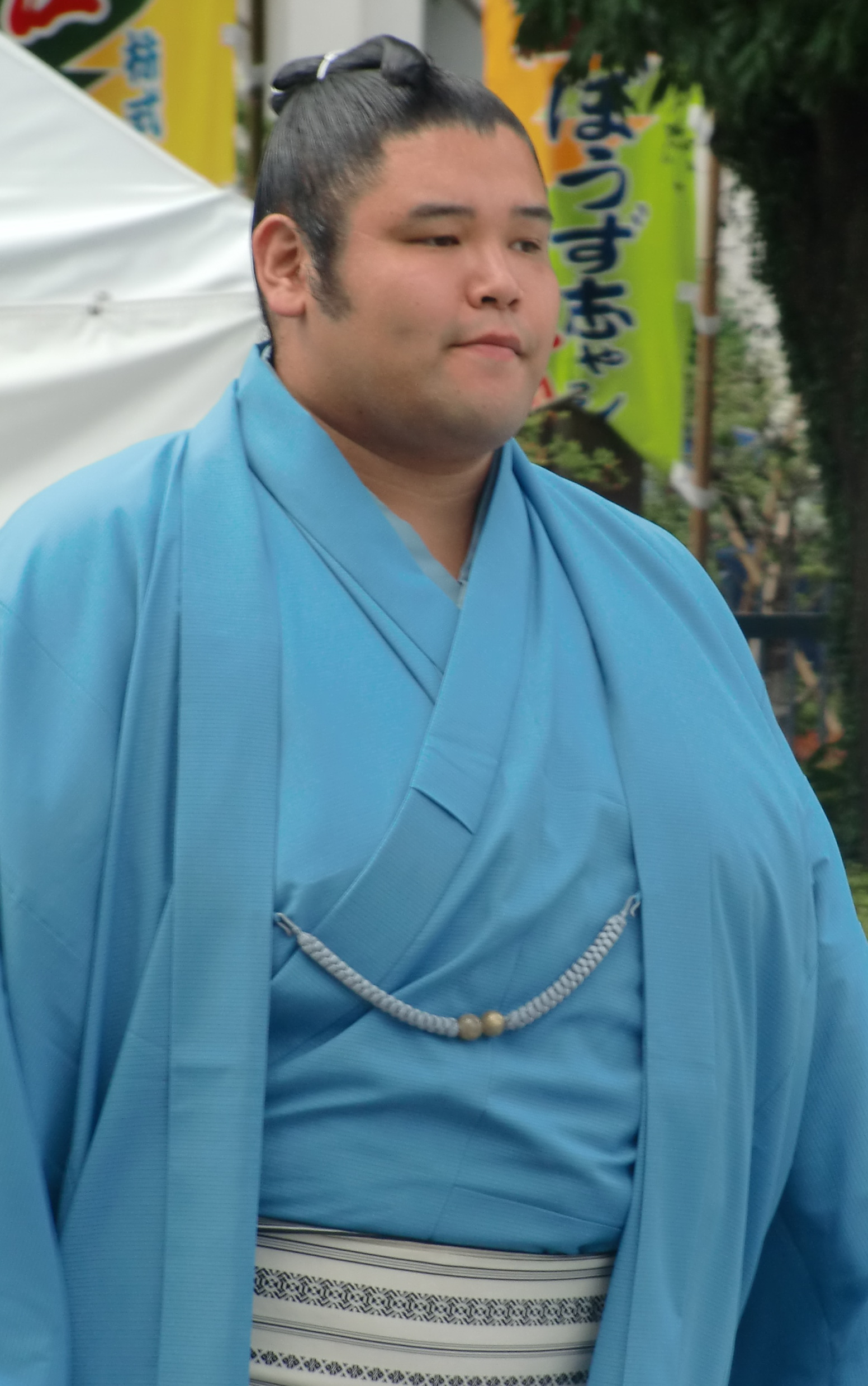
- Tokushinō in 2010

Personal information
- Native name: 徳真鵬元久
- Born: Motohisa Shiratsuka; May 13, 1984 (age 42) Mie Prefecture, Japan
- Height: 1.93 m (6 ft 4 in)
- Weight: 224 kg (494 lb; 35.3 st)

Sport
- Sport: Sumo
- University team: Asahi University
- Retired: June 2020
- Heya: Kise → Kitanoumi → Kise
- Record: 382-373
- Debut: March 2007
- Highest rank: Jūryō 6 (September 2013)
- Championships: 1 (Makushita)
- Updated on July 9, 2020

Tokushinhō Motohisa (Japanese: 德真鵬 元久; born May 13, 1984 as Motohisa Shiratsuka (白塚 元久)) is a Japanese former professional sumo wrestler from Matsusaka, Mie. His sumo stable was Kise (for a short time he belonged to Kitanoumi). His height is 193 cm (6 ft 4 in) and his peak weight is 224 kg (494 lb). His highest rank was jūryō 6. He is the first former amateur from Asahi University to reach the sekitori ranks. He retired in June 2020.

== Career ==
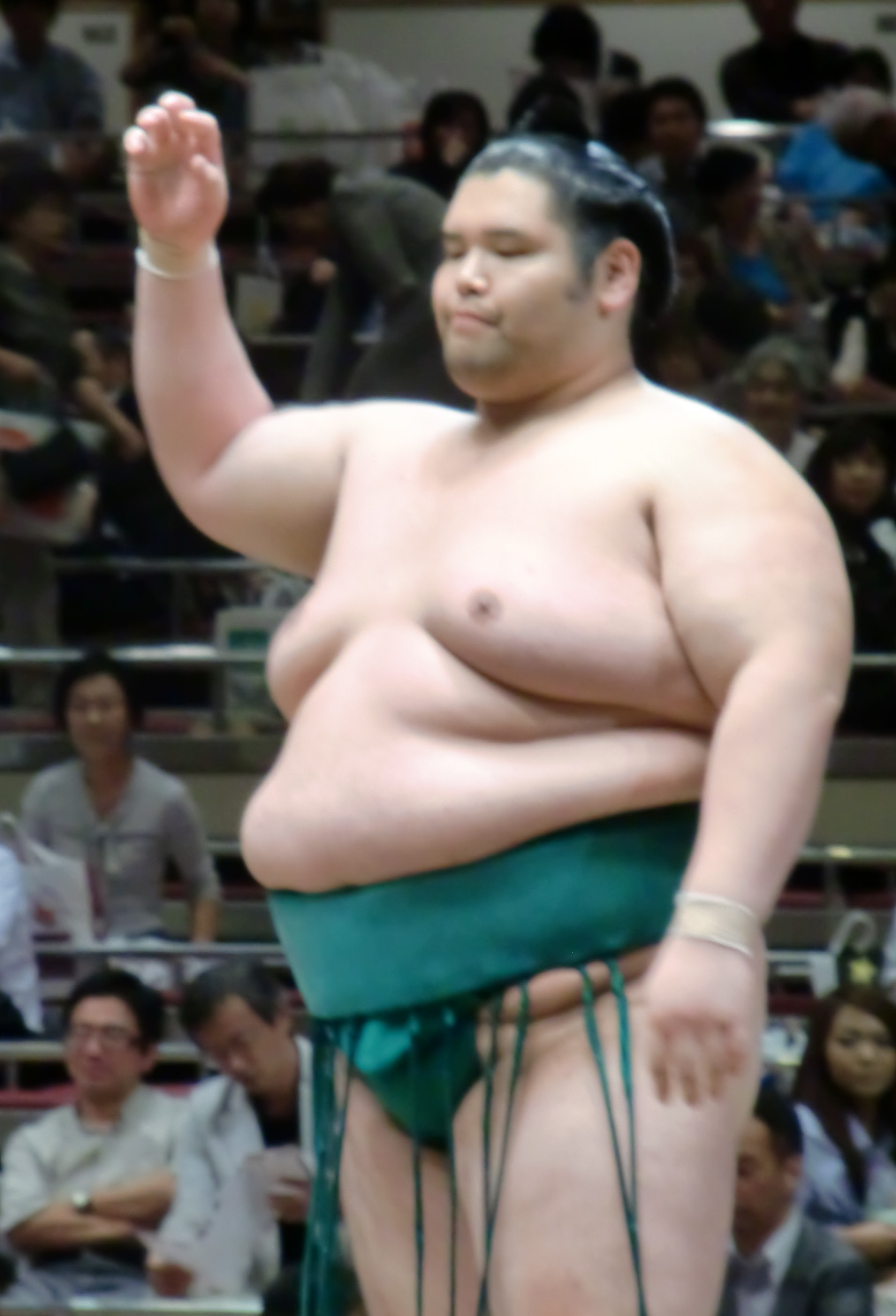
Tokushinhō in May 2010

From elementary school he did karate, but he became interested in sumo at Mie High School and began entering sumo competitions. He was an amateur wrestler at Asahi University and reached the top 16 in the Inter Collegiate and second place in the Western Japan College Tournament. He was a contemporary of Tosayutaka. He joined Kise stable in March 2007 at the age of 23. He was only the third former member of Asahi University's small sumo club to turn professional. He weighed 182 kilograms (401 lb) upon his debut. He initially fought under his own surname of Shiratsuka. In March 2009 he switched to the shikona of Tokushinhō and won the makushita division championship or yūshō with a 6–1 record. He was promoted to the jūryō division for the first time in September 2009. He spent a total of 27 tournaments ranked in jūryō with a win/loss record of 187–218. He never reached the top makuuchi division; his highest rank being jūryō 6 in September 2013. His last appearance in jūryō was in November 2015.

His peak weight of 224 kilograms (494 pounds) means he ranks twelfth in the list of heaviest sumo wrestlers, and is the sixth-heaviest Japanese sumo wrestler ever after Yamamotoyama, Kenho, Susanoumi, Kainowaka and Hidenoumi.

== Retirement from sumo ==
Tokushinhō fell to the sandanme division in the banzuke issued for the May 2020 tournament, and he submitted retirement papers to the Japan Sumo Association, acknowledged on June 1, 2020. His career results were 382 wins against 373 losses over 79 tournaments. He plans to return to Asahi University as a member of staff. He had his danpatsu-shiki or retirement ceremony in October 2021, with around 150 guests including former yokozuna Kisenosato, and the head of Asahi University making the final cut of his topknot.

== Fighting style ==
When fighting on the mawashi or belt Tokushinhō favoured a migi-yotsu (left hand outside, right hand inside) grip. He also regularly used tsuki/oshi (pushing and thrusting) techniques. His most common winning kimarite were yori kiri (force out) and oshi dashi (push out), which together account for over 60 per cent of his career wins.

== Career record ==
Tokushinhō Motohisa
Year	January Hatsu basho, Tokyo	March Haru basho, Osaka	May Natsu basho, Tokyo	July Nagoya basho, Nagoya	September Aki basho, Tokyo	November Kyūshū basho, Fukuoka
2007	x	(Maezumo)	West Jonokuchi #11; 5–2	West Jonidan #89; 6–1	West Jonidan #14; 5–2	East Sandanme #82; 6–1
2008	East Sandanme #25; 6–1	West Makushita #46; 6–1	West Makushita #19; 5–2	East Makushita #11; 3–4	West Makushita #17; 5–2	East Makushita #8; 4–3
2009	West Makushita #5; 2–5	East Makushita #17; 6–1; Champion	East Makushita #4; 4–3	West Makushita #2; 4–3	West Jūryō #12; 6–9	West Makushita #2; 5–2
2010	East Makushita #1; 5–2	West Jūryō #11; 8–7	West Jūryō #7; 7–8	West Jūryō #8; 7–8	East Jūryō #9; 4–11	West Makushita #3; 2–5
2011	East Makushita #9; 3–4	East Makushita #17; Tournament Cancelled; Match fixing investigation 0–0–0	East Makushita #17; 4–3	East Makushita #8; 4–3	East Makushita #2; 4–3	East Makushita #1; 4–3
2012	West Jūryō #12; 8–7	East Jūryō #10; 7–8	East Jūryō #11; 7–8	East Jūryō #12; 7–8	West Jūryō #12; 7–8	West Jūryō #13; 8–7
2013	East Jūryō #12; 8–7	West Jūryō #9; 7–8	East Jūryō #10; 7–8	West Jūryō #10; 10–5	West Jūryō #6; 7–8	East Jūryō #7; 6–9
2014	East Jūryō #9; 8–7	West Jūryō #7; 6–9	West Jūryō #9; 8–7	East Jūryō #7; 7–8	East Jūryō #8; 6–9	West Jūryō #10; 6–9
2015	West Jūryō #12; 5–10	East Makushita #2; 4–3	West Makushita #1; 4–3	West Jūryō #14; 9–6	West Jūryō #9; 7–8	West Jūryō #10; 4–11
2016	West Makushita #3; 2–5	West Makushita #14; 3–4	West Makushita #22; 5–2	East Makushita #13; 4–3	East Makushita #10; 3–4	West Makushita #15; 3–4
2017	West Makushita #23; 4–3	West Makushita #17; 5–2	East Makushita #10; 5–2	East Makushita #6; 2–5	East Makushita #17; 3–4	West Makushita #23; 3–4
2018	West Makushita #28; 5–2	East Makushita #15; 3–4	West Makushita #22; 4–3	East Makushita #16; 4–3	East Makushita #10; 4–3	West Makushita #6; 2–5
2019	West Makushita #17; 5–2	West Makushita #6; 1–6	West Makushita #23; 3–4	East Makushita #31; 2–5	West Makushita #49; 5–2	East Makushita #33; 4–3
2020	West Makushita #27; 2–5	East Makushita #47; 3–4	West Sandanme #4; Tournament Cancelled; State of Emergency; 0–0–0	West Sandanme #4; Retired –	x	x
Record given as wins–losses–absences Top division champion Top division runner-up Retired Lower divisions Non-participation Sanshō key: F=Fighting spirit; O=Outstanding performance; T=Technique Also shown: ★=Kinboshi; P=Playoff(s); Divisions: Makuuchi — Jūryō — Makushita — Sandanme — Jonidan — Jonokuchi Makuuchi ranks: Yokozuna — Ōzeki — Sekiwake — Komusubi — Maegashira

== See also ==
- Glossary of sumo terms
- List of past sumo wrestlers
