= List of the heaviest sumo wrestlers =

The following is a list of the heaviest professional sumo wrestlers. Only wrestlers weighing 200 kilograms (441 lb) or over are included. Wrestlers shown in bold are still active.

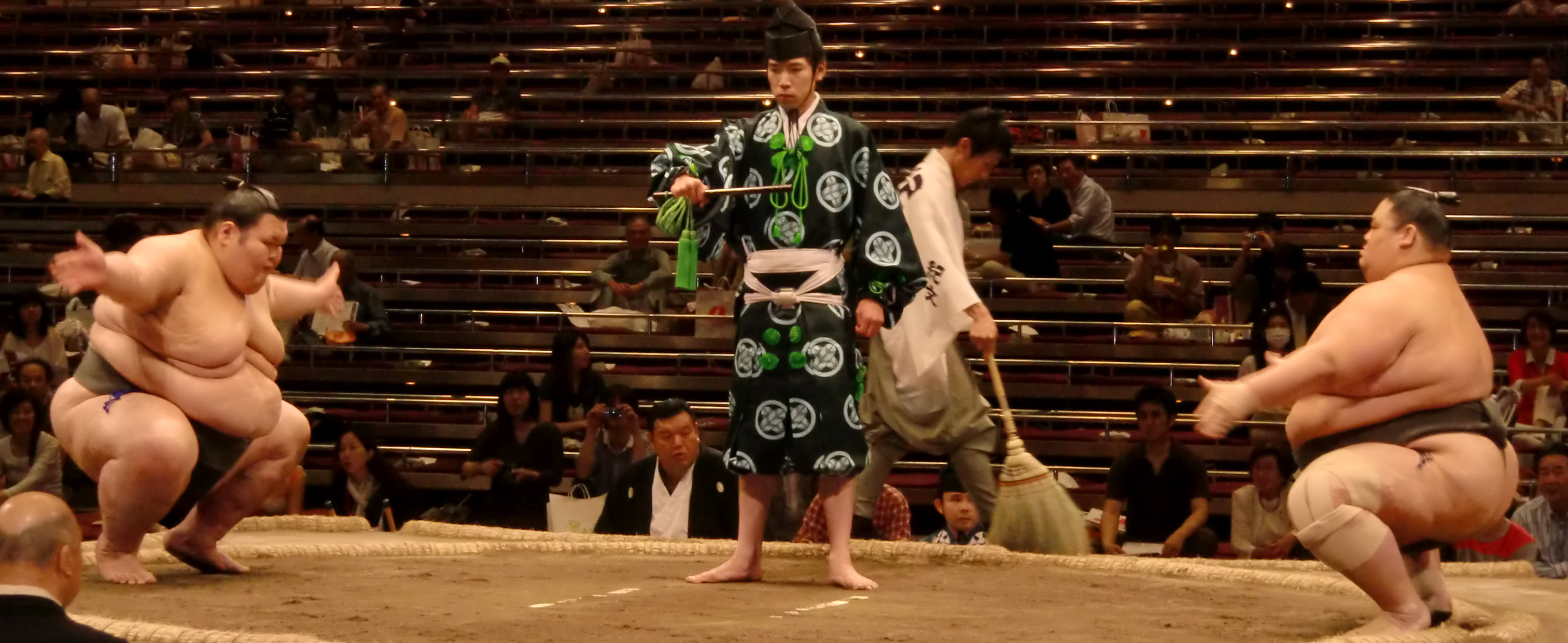
Ōrora (left), the heaviest sumo wrestler ever, fights eighth-heaviest Kainowaka

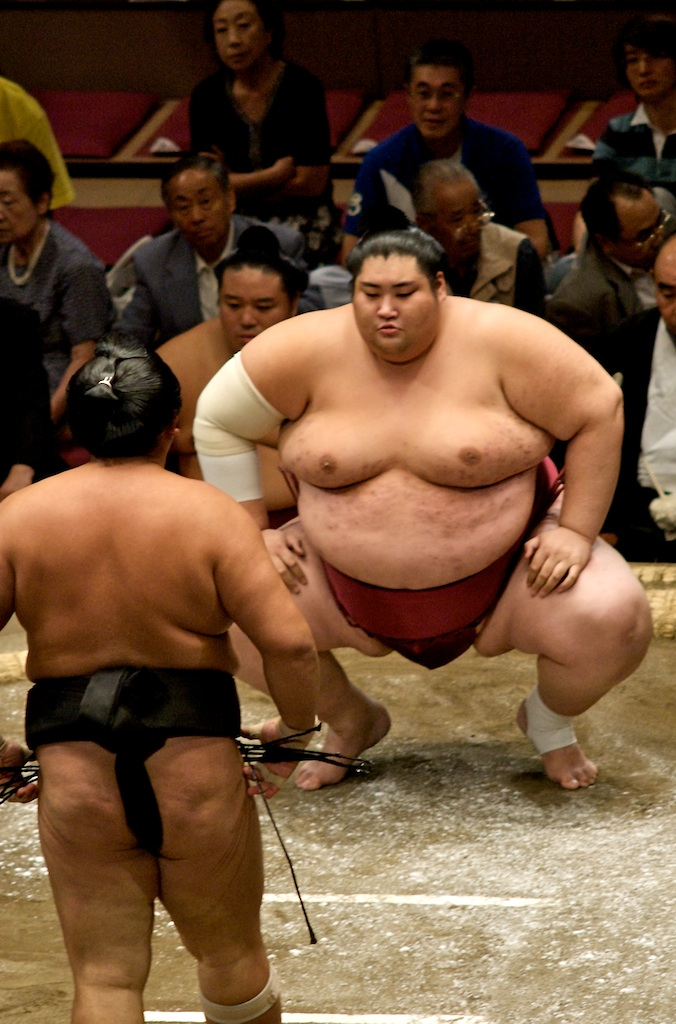
Yamamotoyama is the heaviest Japanese-born sumo wrestler ever

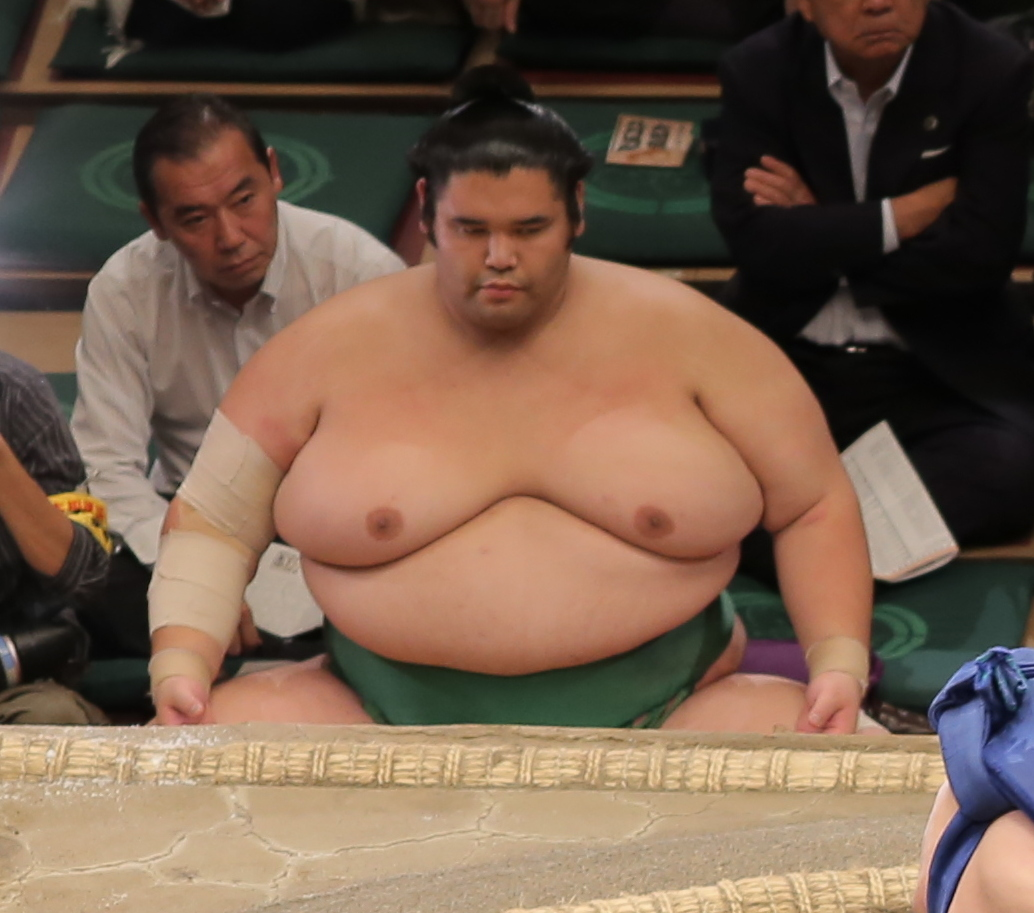
Tokushinhō

Rank	Ring name	Max. weight	Stable	Highest rank	Birth date	Birthplace	Death date
1	Ōrora Satoshi 大露羅	292.6 kg (645 lb)	Yamahibiki (also Kitanoumi)	makushita 43	April 26, 1983 (age 43)	Zaigrayevo, Buryat ASSR, Soviet Union	
2	Konishiki 小錦	287 kg (633 lb)	Takasago	ōzeki	December 31, 1963 (age 62)	Honolulu, Hawaii, United States	
3	Yamamotoyama 山本山	265 kg (584 lb)	Onoe	maegashira 9	May 8, 1984 (age 42)	Saitama, Japan	
4	Dewanojo 出羽ノ城	258 kg (569 lb)	Dewanoumi	makushita 56	December 14, 1993 (age 32)	Tochigi, Japan	
5	Kenho 謙豊	250 kg (550 lb)	Tokitsukaze	makushita 59	February 10, 1989 (age 37)	Miyagi, Japan	
6	Tominohana 富ノ華	241 kg (531 lb)	Takadagawa	jonidan 31	February 15, 1972 (age 54)	Keelung, Taiwan	
7	Susanoumi 須佐の湖	240 kg (530 lb)	Kitanoumi	jūryō 2	August 30, 1972 (age 54)	Osaka, Japan	
8	Kainowaka 魁ノ若	237 kg (522 lb)	Tomozuna	makushita 14	April 20, 1979 (age 47)	Fukuoka, Japan	
8	Musashimaru 武蔵丸	237 kg (522 lb)	Musashigawa	yokozuna	May 2, 1971 (age 55)	American Samoa	
10	Akebono 曙	236 kg (520 lb)	Azumazeki	yokozuna	May 8, 1969	Waimānalo, Hawaii, United States	April 2024 (aged 54)
11	Tokushinhō 德真鵬	234 kg (516 lb)	Kise (also Kitanoumi)	jūryō 6	May 13, 1984 (age 42)	Mie, Japan	
12	Sakaefuji 栄富士	232 kg (511 lb)	Sakaigawa	sandanme 72	August 14, 1992 (age 34)	Tokyo, Japan	
13	Hidenoumi 秀ノ海	229 kg (505 lb)	Mihogaseki	jūryō 9	November 20, 1965 (age 60)	Osaka, Japan	
14	Mankajo 萬華城	228 kg (503 lb)	Oitekaze	makushita 6	February 10, 1990 (age 36)	Miyazaki, Japan	
15	Ichinojō 逸ノ城	227 kg (500 lb)	Minato	sekiwake	April 7, 1993 (age 33)	Arkhangai, Mongolia	
16	**Komanokuni** 高麗の国	226 kg (498 lb)	Shibatayama	makushita 23	June 29, 1990 (age 36)	Kanagawa, Japan	
17	Daiki 大喜	221 kg (487 lb)	Azumazeki	jūryō 10	16 July 1973	Hawaii, United States	May 16, 2005 (aged 31)
17	Takatenshu 貴天秀	221 kg (487 lb)	Chiganoura (also Takanohana)	sandanme 9	September 23, 1992 (age 34)	Saitama, Japan	
19	Toyonoumi 豊ノ海	219 kg (483 lb)	Futagoyama (also Fujishima)	maegashira 1	September 22, 1965	Fukuoka, Japan	20 November 2021 (aged 56)
20	Fujinawa 藤縄	215.5 kg (475 lb)	Isenoumi	jonidan 15	November 2, 1974 (age 52)	Ibaraki, Japan	
21	Ōmatsuda 大松田	214 kg (472 lb)	Ōtake	sandanme 15	August 26, 1986 (age 40)	Hyogo, Japan	
22	Maeta 前田	213 kg (470 lb)	Shibatayama (also Hanaregoma)	makushita 3	June 24, 1982	Yamagata, Japan	26 August 2020 (aged 38)
23	Ryūtei 龍帝	212 kg (467 lb)	Nishonoseki	sandanme 3	June 2, 1986 (age 40)	Shandong, China	
23	Gagamaru 臥牙丸	212 kg (467 lb)	Kise (also Kitanoumi)	komusubi	February 23, 1987 (age 39)	Tbilisi, Georgian SSR, Soviet Union	
25	Toma 當眞	211 kg (465 lb)	Miyagino	sandanme 1	May 10, 2000 (age 26)	Okinawa, Japan	
25	Ōnokuni 大乃国	211 kg (465 lb)	Hanaregoma (also Hanakago)	yokozuna	October 9, 1962 (age 64)	Hokkaido, Japan	
27	Takaryū 高立	210 kg (460 lb)	Kise	jūryō 13	March 18, 1992 (age 34)	Ishikawa, Japan	
28	**Amakaze** 天風	208 kg (459 lb)	Oguruma	maegashira 13	July 7, 1991 (age 35)	Kagawa, Japan	
28	**Higonoryu** 肥後ノ龍	208 kg (459 lb)	Kise	sandanme 7	November 19, 1985 (age 40)	Kumamoto, Japan	
30	Anju 安寿	207 kg (456 lb)	Isegahama	sandanme 94	May 10, 1979 (age 47)	Miyazaki, Japan	
31	Hokutomori 北勝森	206 kg (454 lb)	Hakkaku	makushita 11	September 8, 1971 (age 55)	Aomori, Japan	
32	**Kazuma** 一意 虎風	205 kg (452 lb)	Kise	maegashira 15	November 12, 2001 (age 24)	Osaka, Japan	
32	Kaisei 魁聖	205 kg (452 lb)	Tomozuna	sekiwake	December 18, 1986 (age 39)	São Paulo, Brazil	
32	**Akinoyama** 安芸乃山	205 kg (452 lb)	Takadagawa	makushita 13	November 30, 1992 (age 33)	Hiroshima, Japan	
34	Takamiyama 髙見山	204 kg (450 lb)	Takasago	sekiwake	June 16, 1944 (age 82)	Happy Valley, Hawaii, United States	
35	Kushimaumi 久島海	203 kg (448 lb)	Dewanoumi	maegashira 1	6 August 1965	Wakayama, Japan	13 February 2012 (aged 46)
35	Genkaiho 玄海鵬	203 kg (448 lb)	Hanaregoma (also Hanakago)	jūryō 11	January 22, 1960 (age 66)	Fukuoka, Japan	
35	Yata 矢田	203 kg (448 lb)	Onoe	jonokuchi 30	February 7, 2000 (age 26)	Wakayama, Japan	
35	Aoiyama 碧山	203 kg (448 lb)	Kasugano (also Tagonoura)	sekiwake	June 19, 1986 (age 40)	(People's Republic of Bulgaria) Yambol, Bulgaria	
39	Towanoyama 鳥羽の山	202 kg (445 lb)	Dewanoumi	maegashira 13	July 10, 1977 (age 49)	Tokyo, Japan	
40	Asabenkei 朝弁慶大吉	201 kg (443 lb)	Takasago	jūryō 7	February 12, 1989 (age 37)	Kanagawa, Japan	
40	Mitoryū 水戸龍 聖之	201 kg (443 lb)	Nishikido	maegashira 13	April 25, 1994 (age 32)	Ulaanbaatar, Mongolia	
42	Sadanofuji 佐田の富士	200 kg (441 lb)	Sakaigawa	maegashira 2	December 25, 1984 (age 41)	Nagasaki, Japan	
42	Tsurugishō 剣翔 桃太郎	200 kg (441 lb)	Oitekaze	maegashira 7	July 27, 1991 (age 35)	Tokyo, Japan	

== See also ==
- List of heaviest people
- List of active sumo wrestlers
- List of past sumo wrestlers
- List of sumo elders
- List of sumo record holders
- List of sumo stables
