= Akiseyama Mitsuhiko =

Japanese sumo wrestler

明瀬山 光彦 Akiseyama Mitsuhiko
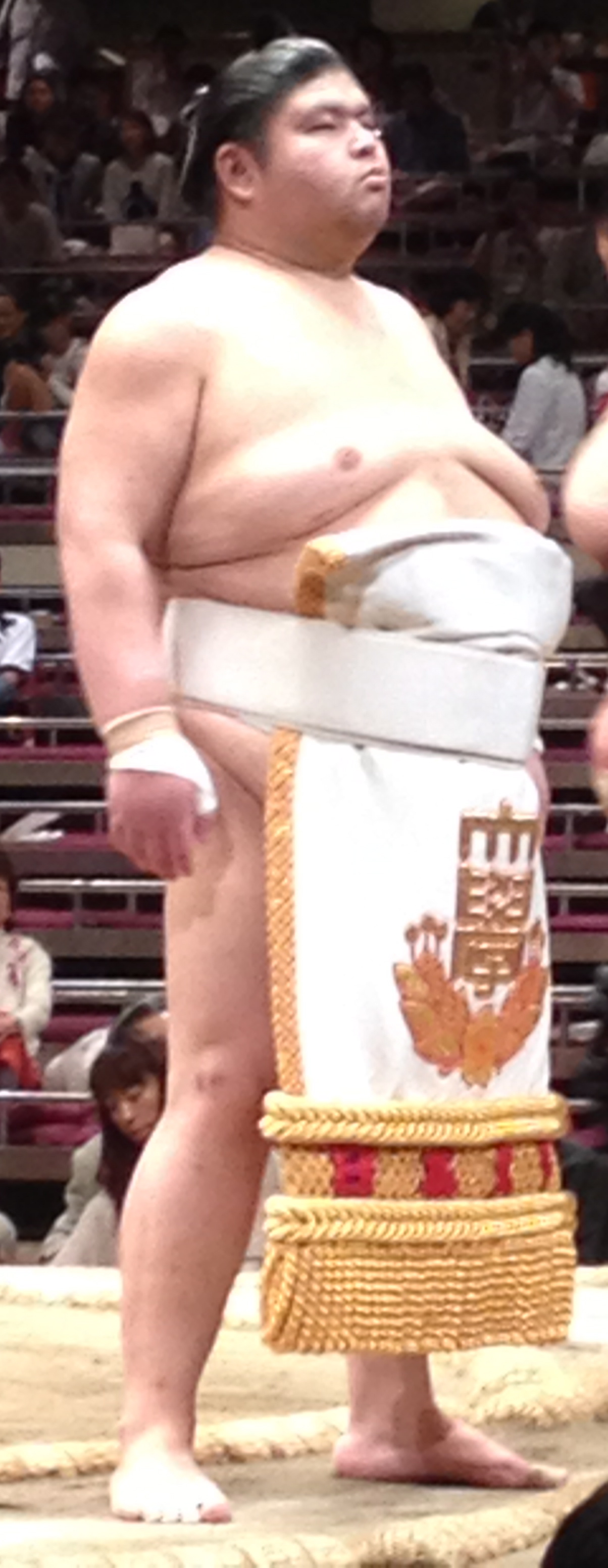
- Akiseyama in 2014

Personal information
- Born: Mitsuhiko Fukao; July 18, 1985 (age 41) Kasugai, Aichi, Japan
- Height: 1.82 m (5 ft 11 1/2 in)
- Weight: 181 kg (399 lb)

Sport
- Sport: Sumo
- University team: Nihon University
- Retired: August, 2023
- Heya: Kise → Kitanoumi → Kise
- Record: 472-473-29
- Debut: January, 2008
- Highest rank: Maegashira 12 (March, 2021)
- Elder name: Izutsu
- Championships: 1 (Makushita); 1 (Jonokuchi)
- Updated on 10 August 2023

Akiseyama Mitsuhiko (Japanese: 明瀬山 光彦; born July 18, 1985 as Mitsuhiko Fukao (深尾 光彦, Fukao Mitsuhiko)) is a former Japanese professional sumo wrestler from Kasugai, Aichi. An amateur sumo competitor while studying at Nihon University, he made his professional debut in January 2008. He has two lower-division championships in jonokuchi and makushita, and reached the top makuuchi division in March 2016. His highest rank was maegashira 12. He wrestled for Kise stable, where he now coaches under the name of Izutsu.

== Early life and sumo background ==
Fukao started sumo at the Chukyo Sumo Club in elementary school, this is where he met the future Kiyoseumi who was one year his senior. He had a deep respect and friendship with his senior. They trained and practiced together throughout their school years and both attended Nihon University. Eventually after university Akiseyama would choose to enter the same Kise stable.

== Career ==
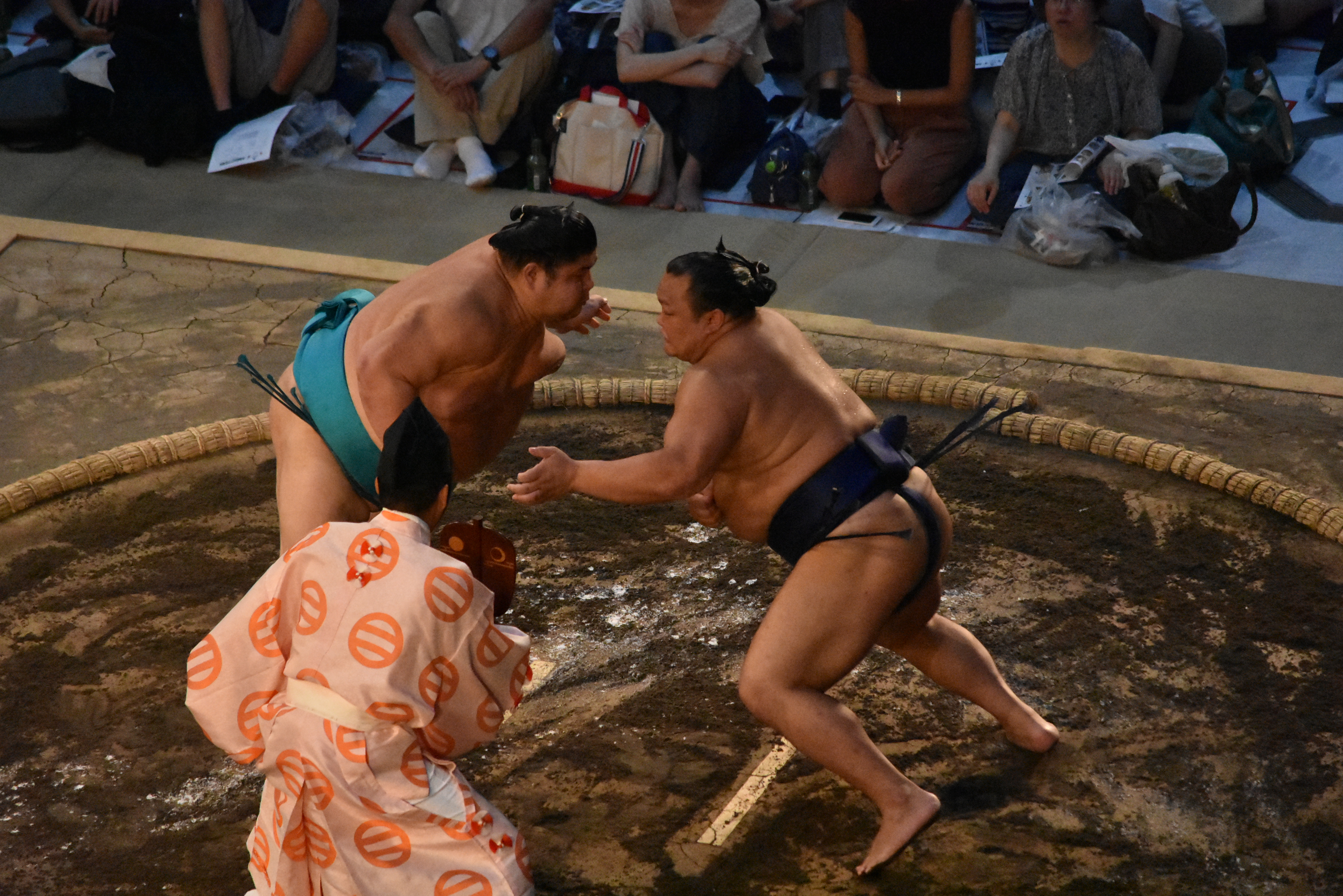
Akiseyama (left) in an exhibition bout in 2018

He made his debut exactly one year after Kiyoseumi in January, 2008, debuting with the likes of Kyokutaisei and Homarefuji. He quickly rose up to the makushita division after spending just one tournament at each of the lower divisions. He finally broke through to the sekitori ranks after nearly three years in November 2010. To mark the occasion he changed his shikona from his family name of Fukao to Akiseyama, with the "se" kanji taken from his stable. He was to last only four tournaments in before being demoted back down. During this period he was restricted by a hernia.

He returned to jūryō at the end of 2012 and after over eight years after his debut he broke through to the top makuuchi division in March 2016. The 48 tournaments it took him to reach the top division from his professional debut was the fourth slowest by a former collegiate wrestler. He lasted just one tournament, scoring only four wins against eleven losses, and returned to jūryō. After only managing one win against fourteen losses in the next tournament in May 2016 he was demoted straight to makushita, where he remained for the next two years.

He was promoted back to jūryō in March 2018 and produced a strong 11–4 record, taking part in a playoff for the championship. He reached jūryō 1 in July 2018, his highest rank since his single makuuchi appearance. However, seven consecutive losing scores saw him fall to the bottom of jūryō and then be relegated to the makushita division after the July 2019 tournament. He returned to jūryō after just one tournament away by recording a 4–3 score in September. He was demoted to makushita again in January 2020 but returned to the jūryō division in March and remained in jūryō for the rest of 2020.

Akiseyama returned to the makuuchi division in January 2021 for the first time in 28 tournaments, the fourth slowest return in sumo history. In his makuuchi return Akiseyama began the tournament with six straight wins, before suffering five straight losses. Another run of three wins saw him enter Day 15 with a 9–5 record, and the knowledge that he would be awarded the Fighting Spirit prize if he won. Matched against Kagayaki, he was called the winner by the gyōji after pulling off an amiuchi or fisherman's throw, but the judges called for a re-match, which he lost. He narrowly missed a winning record in the following March tournament, but remained in the top division. In May he withdrew from a tournament for the first time in his career, after suffering a jaw fracture in a bout against Chiyotairyū. He missed the next two tournaments causing him to fall to the makushita division.

== Retirement from sumo ==
After Akiseyama spent two years in the makushita division, his retirement was announced by the Japan Sumo Association on 10 August 2023. Akiseyama became an elder of the Japan Sumo Association, acquiring the vacant Izutsu elder stock upon retirement.

Akiseyama's retirement ceremony was held on 2 June 2024 at the Ryōgoku Kokugikan, with about 300 people taking part in cutting his topknot. Akiseyama departed from the Sumo Association in August 2026 after serving three years as a master.

== Fighting style ==
Akiseyama lists his preferred techniques on his Japan Sumo Association profile as tsuki/oshi, pushing and thrusting his opponents rather fighting on the mawashi or belt. However his most common winning kimarite in his career was yori-kiri, or force out, which usually involves a mawashi grip. This is because he made a deliberate decision to change his style of wrestling after his hernia problem, working with his stablemaster Kise to grab the mawashi with his right hand to speed up the attack and use his weight to his advantage. Former yokozuna Kitanoumi also encouraged him to go for a right hand grip when Akiseyama was temporarily a member of Kitanoumi stable from 2010 until 2012.

== Personal life ==
At his retirement ceremony, Akiseyama announced that he had gotten married in December 2020. The couple have a son, born in November 2021.

== Career record ==
Akiseyama Mitsuhiko
| Year | January Hatsu basho, Tokyo | March Haru basho, Osaka | May Natsu basho, Tokyo | July Nagoya basho, Nagoya | September Aki basho, Tokyo | November Kyūshū basho, Fukuoka |
|---|---|---|---|---|---|---|
| 2008 | (Maezumo) | East Jonokuchi #26; 7–0; Champion | East Jonidan #24; 7–0–P | East Sandanme #30; 6–1 | West Makushita #48; 4–3 | East Makushita #36; 4–3 |
| 2009 | East Makushita #29; 5–2 | East Makushita #15; 5–2 | East Makushita #7; 2–5 | West Makushita #16; 6–1; Champion | East Makushita #5; 2–5 | West Makushita #13; 1–6 |
| 2010 | West Makushita #35; 6–1 | West Makushita #16; 4–3 | West Makushita #11; 4–3 | East Makushita #7; 4–3 | East Makushita #2; 4–3 | East Jūryō #13; 8–7 |
| 2011 | West Jūryō #10; 8–7 | West Jūryō #7; Tournament Cancelled; Match fixing investigation 0–0–0 | West Jūryō #7; 4–11 | East Jūryō #8; 2–13 | West Makushita #4; 2–5 | East Makushita #11; 5–2 |
| 2012 | West Makushita #5; 2–5 | East Makushita #13; 4–3 | West Makushita #8; 3–4 | East Makushita #13; 6–1 | West Makushita #5; 6–1 | East Jūryō #13; 8–7 |
| 2013 | West Jūryō #10; 7–8 | East Jūryō #12; 7–8 | East Jūryō #13; 7–8 | West Makushita #2; 4–3 | West Jūryō #13; 8–7 | East Jūryō #8; 6–9 |
| 2014 | West Jūryō #9; 5–10 | West Jūryō #13; 9–6 | West Jūryō #7; 6–9 | East Jūryō #11; 6–9 | East Jūryō #13; 6–9 | West Makushita #1; 5–2 |
| 2015 | West Jūryō #10; 6–9 | West Jūryō #13; 8–7 | West Jūryō #11; 6–9 | East Jūryō #14; 8–7 | West Jūryō #10; 9–6 | East Jūryō #7; 8–7 |
| 2016 | West Jūryō #5; 8–7 | East Maegashira #16; 4–11 | West Jūryō #5; 1–14 | West Makushita #2; 3–4 | West Makushita #6; 1–6 | West Makushita #21; 5–2 |
| 2017 | West Makushita #9; 5–2 | East Makushita #4; 2–5 | West Makushita #13; 5–2 | East Makushita #9; 5–2 | West Makushita #4; 3–4 | East Makushita #9; 4–3 |
| 2018 | West Makushita #4; 4–3 | West Jūryō #13; 11–4–P | West Jūryō #5; 10–5 | West Jūryō #1; 6–9 | West Jūryō #3; 6–9 | East Jūryō #6; 7–8 |
| 2019 | West Jūryō #7; 6–9 | West Jūryō #9; 5–10 | West Jūryō #13; 7–8 | East Jūryō #14; 4–11 | West Makushita #5; 4–3 | East Jūryō #14; 5–10 |
| 2020 | East Makushita #4; 4–3 | West Jūryō #14; 9–6 | East Jūryō #9; Tournament Cancelled; State of Emergency; 0–0–0 | East Jūryō #9; 7–8 | East Jūryō #10; 11–4 | East Jūryō #1; 9–6 |
| 2021 | West Maegashira #16; 9–6 | East Maegashira #12; 7–8 | East Maegashira #13; 1–7–7 | East Jūryō #7; Sat out due to injury 0–0–15 | West Makushita #5; Sat out due to injury 0–0–7 | West Makushita #45; 5–2 |
| 2022 | West Makushita #30; 6–1 | East Makushita #11; 4–3 | West Makushita #8; 4–3 | East Makushita #6; 3–5 | West Makushita #11; 3–4 | West Makushita #18; 4–3 |
| 2023 | East Makushita #13; 4–3 | East Makushita #10; 4–3 | West Makushita #7; 2–5 | East Makushita #12; 5–2 | West Makushita #6; Retired – | x |
Record given as wins–losses–absences Top division champion Top division runner-up Retired Lower divisions Non-participation Sanshō key: F=Fighting spirit; O=Outstanding performance; T=Technique Also shown: ★=Kinboshi; P=Playoff(s); Divisions: Makuuchi — Jūryō — Makushita — Sandanme — Jonidan — Jonokuchi Makuuchi ranks: Yokozuna — Ōzeki — Sekiwake — Komusubi — Maegashira

== See also ==
- Glossary of sumo terms
- List of sumo elders
- List of past sumo wrestlers
