= Sadanofuji Akihiro =

Japanese sumo wrestler

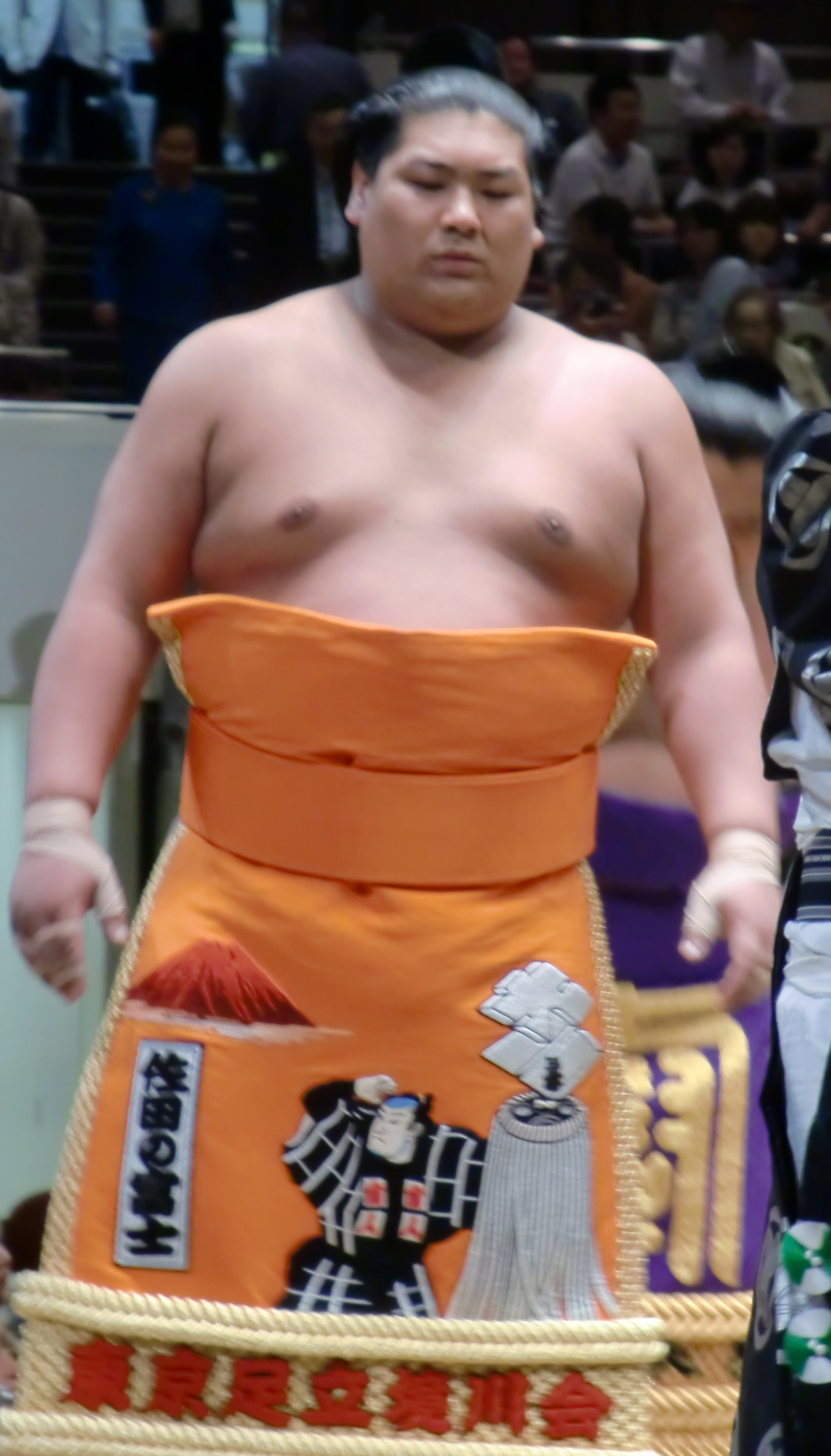
- Akihiro in 2010

Personal information
- Native name: 佐田の富士 哲博
- Born: Akihiro Yamamoto; December 25, 1984 (age 41) Kazusa, Nagasaki, Japan
- Height: 1.88 m (6 ft 2 in)
- Weight: 200 kg (440 lb)

Sport
- Sport: Sumo
- Retired: May 2017
- Heya: Sakaigawa
- Record: 434–459–14
- Debut: January 2003
- Highest rank: Maegashira 2 (September 2015)
- Elder name: Furiwake
- Championships: 1 (Jūryō)
- Updated on 7 June 2021

Sadanofuji Akihiro (佐田の富士 哲博) (born December 25, 1984, as Akihiro Yamamoto) is a former sumo wrestler from Kazusa, Nagasaki, Japan. He was a jūryō division champion in 2012. The highest rank he reached was maegashira 2. He retired in 2017 and was a coach at Sakaigawa stable under the name of Furiwake (振分) until 2024.

== Early life and sumo background ==
During his school years, he practiced judo. On graduating from high school, through the efforts of a former teacher, he made contact with Nakadachi (later Sakaigawa) stable and was accepted. His ring debut was in January 2003.

== Career ==
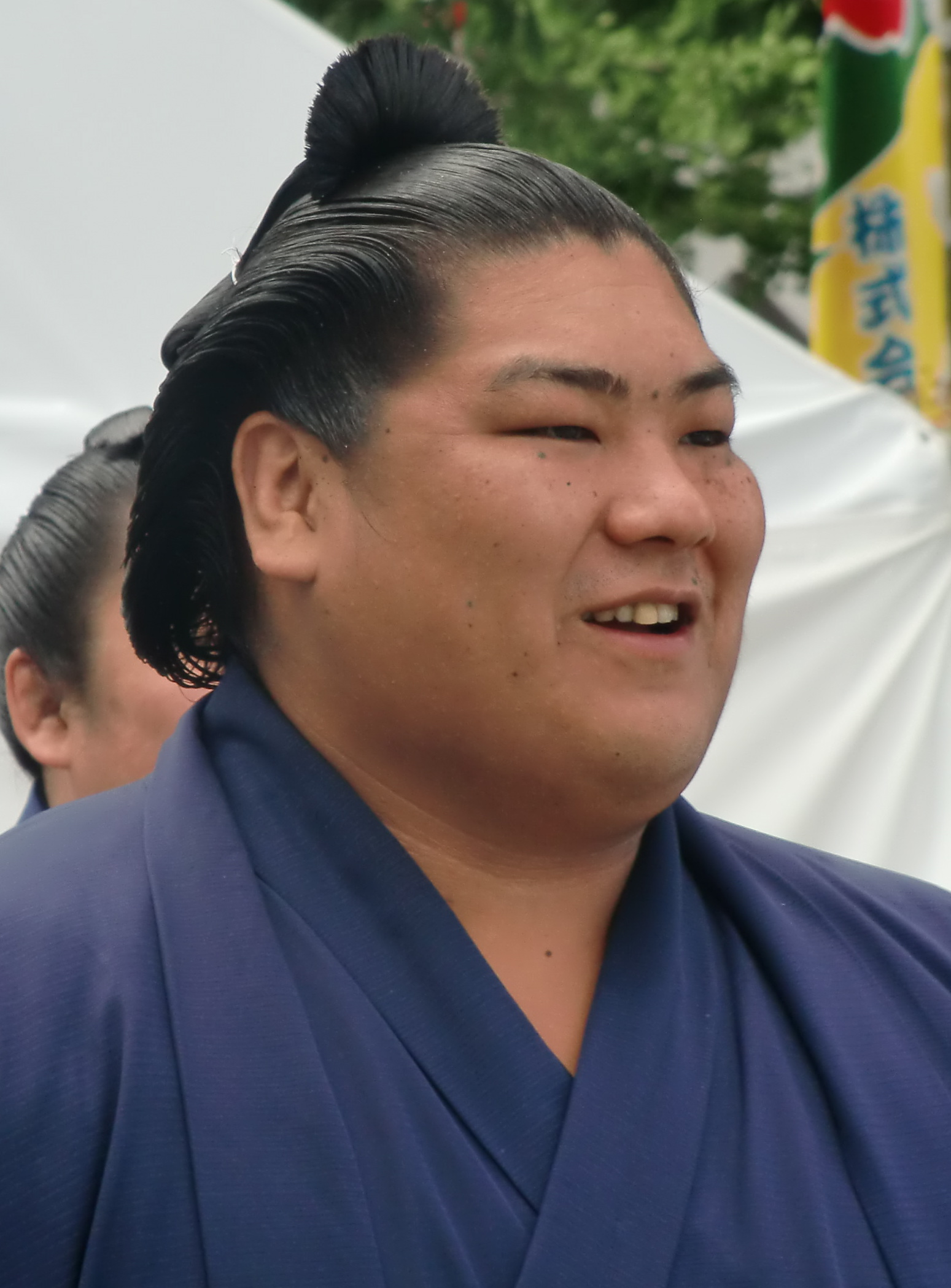
Sadanofuji in September 2010

Sadanofuji spent over seven years in the lower divisions, spending a significant amount of time in all but the lowest division. He spent the bulk of his career in the third makushita division, posting largely 4–3 and 3–4 records. In the March 2009 tournament he achieved a 6–1 record and participated in an eight wrestler playoff for the makushita championship. He won against his first two opponents in the playoff, but ultimately lost the championship to Tokushinhō in the final bout of the playoff. Following this, his sumo grew more consistent and over the next five tournaments he achieved strong winning records in all but one tournament. In March 2010 he finally reached the second jūryō division. Two losing tournaments put him back in makushita for one tournament, but he was back up again for the following September 2010 tournament. After one more year in jūryō he was promoted to the top-tier makuuchi division.

Sadanofuji produced a bare majority of wins in his first two top division tournaments, but then had four successive make-koshi or losing scores, which saw him demoted back to jūryō. However, he made a strong comeback in the November 2012 tournament, winning his first yūshō or tournament championship with a 14–1 record and earning immediate promotion back to makuuchi. He was in the top division for eight consecutive tournaments until being demoted for the May 2014 tournament. In 2015 he established himself as a top division regular, recording his best score to date of 10–5 in the July 2015 tournament, which saw him ranked among the top maegashira for the first time. In September however, wrestling at maegashira 2 he lost his first thirteen matches before salvaging wins in the last two days to end with a 2–13 record. He was demoted from the top division after scoring only 4–11 in the following tournament in November 2015. He re-appeared in makuuchi in July 2016 but was unable to stay longer than a single tournament. After scoring only 4–11 and 2–13 in the jūryō division in September and November 2016 he was relegated to the makushita division for the January 2017 tournament, losing sekitori status for the first time since 2010. He withdrew from the March tournament with injury and was relegated to sandanme for the first time since 2006.

== Retirement from sumo ==
Sadanofuji retired after the May 2017 tournament. He stayed with the Japan Sumo Association as a coach at his stable, initially under the borrowed elder name of Nakamura Oyakata held by Yoshikaze. His danpatsu-shiki, or retirement ceremony, was held at the Ryogoku Kokugikan on September 2, 2017, with around 300 people taking a cut of his hair. In August 2019 he switched to the Yamashina elder name, previously used by former komusubi Ōnishiki. When that was needed by his retiring former stablemate Toyohibiki in June 2021, he switched to the Dekiyama name.

In December 2023 Sadanofuji changed his elder name to Furiwake after exchanging toshiyori stock with former maegashira Hōchiyama.

Sadanofuji's retirement from the Sumo Association as an elder was announced on 17 April 2024.

== Personal life ==
Sadanofuji was the tsukebito of the upper division wrestler Iwakiyama for many years, but in 2009 his coach, seeing his potential, released him from his duties so he could concentrate on his sumo. His younger brother Koki joined his stable in 2009 under the shikona Obamaumi (later Sadanoryu) and reached a highest rank of makushita 33 in March 2019, retiring in September 2021.

Sadanofuji was the first wrestler in makuuchi since Chiyonofuji to have five characters in his ring name.

Sadanofuji announced his engagement at a press conference in June 2013. The wedding reception was held the following February, and the couple's first child was born in January 2015.

== Fighting style ==
Sadnofuji was a pusher–thruster who was not keen on fighting on the mawashi or belt. His most common winning kimarite was oshi dashi, a straightforward push out. He weighed 208 kg (459 lb) at the Aki basho in September 2015, making him the joint-heaviest man in the top division alongside Ichinojō.

== Career record ==
Sadanofuji Akihiro
Year	January Hatsu basho, Tokyo	March Haru basho, Osaka	May Natsu basho, Tokyo	July Nagoya basho, Nagoya	September Aki basho, Tokyo	November Kyūshū basho, Fukuoka
2003	(Maezumo)	West Jonokuchi #31; 4–3	West Jonidan #100; 4–3	East Jonidan #73; 3–4	West Jonidan #94; 4–3	East Jonidan #65; 3–4
2004	West Jonidan #84; 6–1	East Jonidan #10; 4–3	West Sandanme #92; 2–5	East Jonidan #17; 5–2	East Sandanme #79; 3–4	West Sandanme #93; 3–4
2005	West Jonidan #9; 5–2	West Sandanme #69; 2–5	West Sandanme #94; 6–1	West Sandanme #35; 2–5	East Sandanme #64; 5–2	East Sandanme #33; 4–3
2006	East Sandanme #23; 4–3	West Sandanme #8; 5–2	West Makushita #50; 3–4	East Sandanme #3; 4–3	East Makushita #52; 3–4	West Sandanme #1; 5–2
2007	West Makushita #42; 4–3	West Makushita #35; 5–2	East Makushita #22; 4–3	West Makushita #16; 3–4	East Makushita #24; 5–2	West Makushita #15; 4–3
2008	West Makushita #13; 4–3	East Makushita #10; 5–2	East Makushita #22; 4–3	West Makushita #17; 3–4	East Makushita #25; 5–2	West Makushita #11; 4–3
2009	East Makushita #8; 2–5	East Makushita #25; 6–1–PPP	East Makushita #9; 5–2	West Makushita #3; 2–5	East Makushita #14; 5–2	West Makushita #9; 6–1
2010	East Makushita #3; 6–1	East Jūryō #11; 6–9	East Jūryō #14; 7–8	East Makushita #1; 4–3	West Jūryō #8; 8–7	West Jūryō #2; 5–10
2011	West Jūryō #7; 6–9	Tournament Cancelled; 0–0–0	West Jūryō #9; 5–10	East Jūryō #7; 9–6	East Jūryō #2; 8–7	West Maegashira #15; 8–7
2012	West Maegashira #11; 8–7	East Maegashira #10; 6–9	West Maegashira #11; 7–8	East Maegashira #12; 5–10	West Maegashira #15; 5–10	West Jūryō #4; 14–1; Champion
2013	East Maegashira #12; 7–8	East Maegashira #12; 9–6	West Maegashira #8; 7–8	West Maegashira #9; 5–10	West Maegashira #12; 8–7	East Maegashira #9; 7–8
2014	East Maegashira #10; 6–9	West Maegashira #12; 2–13	East Jūryō #5; 9–6	West Jūryō #1; 9–6	West Maegashira #12; 4–11	East Jūryō #2; 10–5
2015	East Maegashira #15; 8–7	East Maegashira #14; 9–6	West Maegashira #7; 6–9	East Maegashira #9; 10–5	West Maegashira #2; 2–13	West Maegashira #9; 4–11
2016	East Jūryō #2; 6–9	East Jūryō #4; 7–8	West Jūryō #4; 9–6	West Maegashira #15; 4–11	West Jūryō #5; 4–11	West Jūryō #13; 2–13
2017	East Makushita #9; 1–6	East Makushita #26; Sat out due to injury 0–0–7	West Sandanme #6; Retired; 0–0–7	x	x	x
Record given as wins–losses–absences Top division champion Top division runner-up Retired Lower divisions Non-participation Sanshō key: F=Fighting spirit; O=Outstanding performance; T=Technique Also shown: ★=Kinboshi; P=Playoff(s); Divisions: Makuuchi — Jūryō — Makushita — Sandanme — Jonidan — Jonokuchi Makuuchi ranks: Yokozuna — Ōzeki — Sekiwake — Komusubi — Maegashira

== See also ==
- List of sumo tournament second division champions
- Glossary of sumo terms
- List of heaviest sumo wrestlers
- List of past sumo wrestlers
- List of sumo elders
