= Gagamaru Masaru =

Georgian sumo wrestler

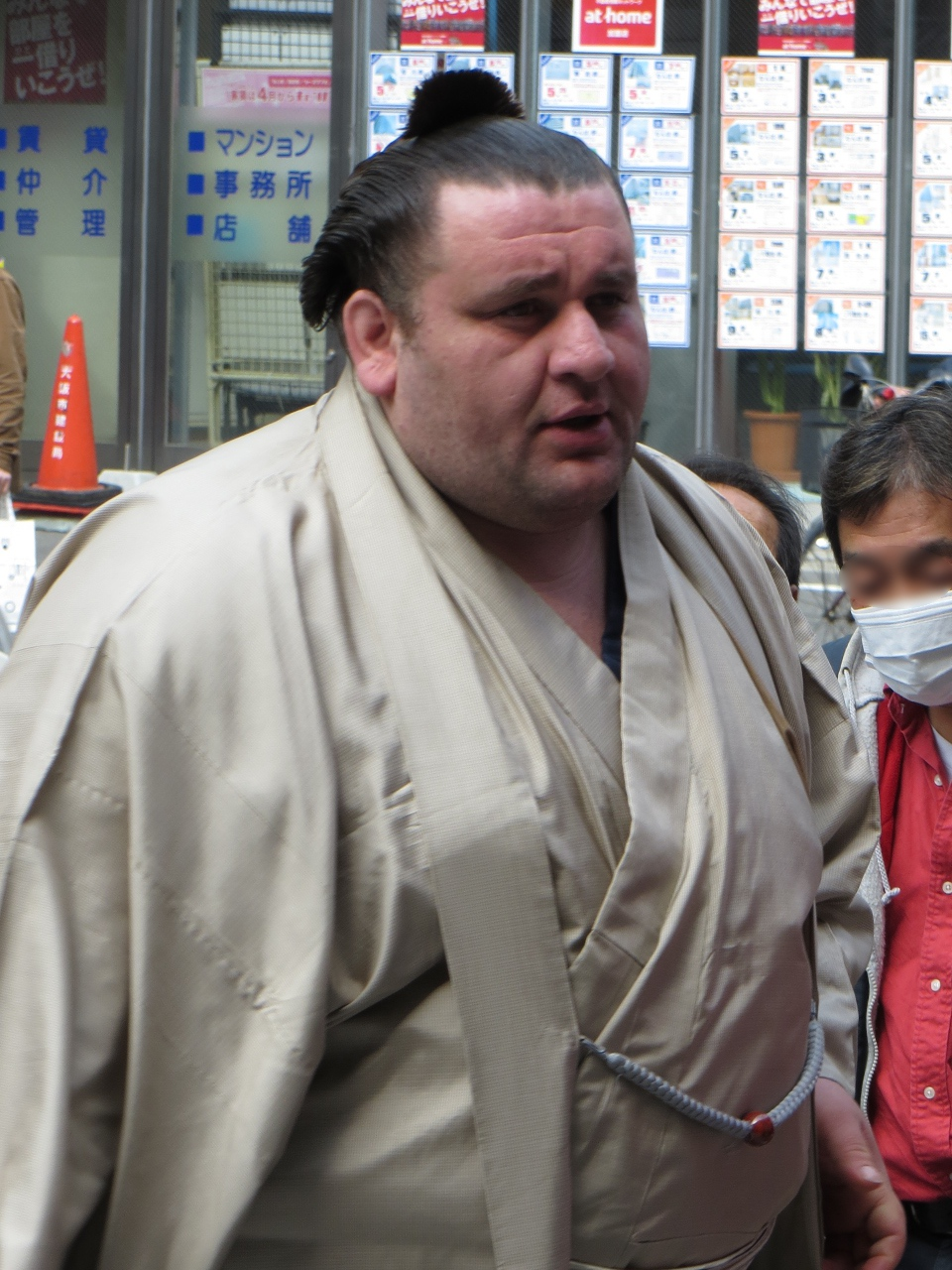
- Gagamaru in 2013

Personal information
- Native name: 臥牙丸 勝
- Born: Teimuraz Jugheli; February 23, 1987 (age 39) Tbilisi, Georgian SSR, Soviet Union
- Height: 186 cm (6 ft 1 in)
- Weight: 199 kg (439 lb; 31.3 st)

Sport
- Sport: Sumo
- Retired: November 2020
- Heya: Kise→Kitanoumi→Kise
- Record: 516-538-32
- Debut: November 2005
- Highest rank: Komusubi (March 2012)
- Championships: 1 (Jūryō); 1 (Makushita); 1 (Jonokuchi)
- Special Prizes: Fighting Spirit (2)
- Gold Stars: 1 (Harumafuji)
- Updated on November 17, 2020

Gagamaru Masaru (Japanese: 臥牙丸 勝; born 23 February 1987 as Teimuraz Jugheli (Georgian: თეიმურაზ ჯუღელი)) is a Georgian former professional sumo wrestler from Tbilisi. The third Georgian national after Kokkai and Tochinoshin to make the top makuuchi division, he made his professional debut in November 2005, reaching the jūryō division in November 2009 and makuuchi in July 2010. Originally from Kise stable, he briefly competed for the Kitanoumi stable before moving back to the Kise stable after it was re-established. His highest rank was komusubi. He won two special prizes for Fighting Spirit and was runner-up in one top division tournament. After missing nearly all of 2020 through injury and falling greatly in rank, he announced his retirement during the November 2020 tournament.

== Early life and sumo background ==
Jugheli was born in Tbilisi, he originally trained in judo and sambo, winning national junior championships in both sports by the age of 16. Invited to train by the Georgian junior sumo team, he accompanied them to the 2005 World Junior Sumo Championships in Osaka. (Also on the team was the future Tochinoshin). He came third in the individual and second in the team competition. Staying in Japan after the tournament, he joined Kise stable and made his first professional appearance in November 2005.

== Career ==
He moved quickly through the lower divisions, reaching makushita one year later in November 2006. He had made plans to return home to visit his family, but his father was killed in a car accident. He was determined to honour his father's memory (and emulate his fellow Georgian wrestlers) by reaching sekitori status. This he achieved in September 2009 after winning the makushita division yūshō with a perfect 7–0 record. He paid tribute to his father at a press conference.

Gagamaru came through with a kachi-koshi 8–7 score in his debut jūryō tournament and won the yusho in the following tournament in January 2010 with a 12–3 record. In May he scored 10–5 from the jūryō 1 rank, ensuring promotion to makuuchi. However he made his debut in the top division in July out of a newly enlarged Kitanoumi stable after his old stable was closed due to his stablemaster's Kise Oyakata involvement in a scandal involving selling tournament tickets to alleged yakuza members. Ranked at maegashira 12 he could only manage a 5–10 record, losing his last four bouts, but he remained in the division for the following tournament in September 2010 and produced a winning score of 10–5. In the November tournament in Kyushu he recovered from a 1–5 start to score 9–6, which earned him promotion to a new high of maegashira 6.

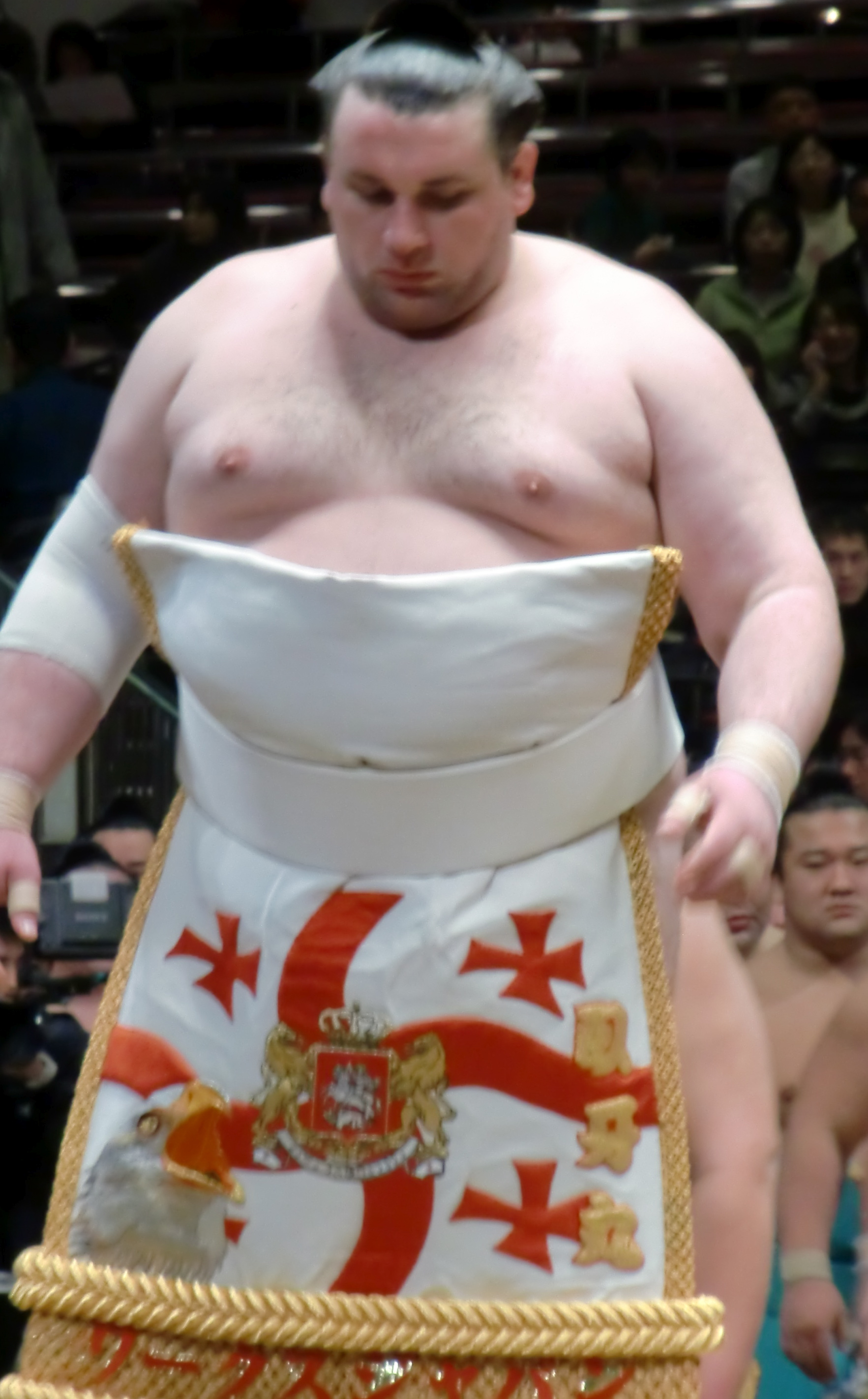
Gagamaru at the January 2011 tournament

The January 2011 tournament was not a good one for Gagamaru. Having struggled to a 2–4 record after six days he went out drinking with fellow Georgian wrestler Kokkai and the pair allegedly got into a fight at an Indian restaurant in Tokyo's Sumida ward, causing damage to the property. Both were reprimanded by the Sumo Association for staying out late during a tournament. Gagamaru finished with a poor 5–10 record, resulting in demotion to maegashira 14. In the May Technical Examination Tournament he recovered from 4–7 down to win four in a row and get a winning record. In September 2011 after an opening day loss he then won ten in a row, including an emphatic victory over Baruto in his first ever meeting with an ōzeki. He finished on 11–4 and was awarded his first special prize, for Fighting Spirit. He was promoted to maegashira 3 for the November 2011 tournament, but facing all the top wrestlers for the first time could only win two matches. However he turned things around in the January 2012 tournament, producing his best score to date of 12–3, sharing runner-up honours with yokozuna Hakuhō and two wins behind tournament winner Baruto. He received his second Fighting Spirit prize for this performance. For the March tournament Gagamaru was promoted to komusubi, becoming the first member of Kitanoumi stable to reach the san'yaku ranks since it was established in 1985. He lost his first six matches, but performed better in the second week of the tournament, finishing with a respectable 6–9. As of the May 2012 tournament he once again represented Kise stable after it was permitted to re–open. Ranked at maegashira 2 in May he did defeat ōzeki Harumafuji but otherwise had an unremarkable tournament, finishing on 5–10.

The shikona Gagamaru was derived by the Kise stablemaster, the former Higonoumi, from Jugheli's nickname "Gaga". Since then he has, inevitably, been dubbed "Lady Gaga Maru." Speaking to reporters after the 9th day of the September 2011 tournament, he quipped, "Let me tell you I was called Gaga since the time I was born. The real Gaga is me." Since this time, he has only had one breakout performance, an 11–4 record at maegashira 11 in May 2013. Though he was a fixture in the mid to lower top division ranks for a while, he was relegated to the second division after three losing records in 2014.

Gagamaru returned to the top division at the March 2015 tournament with excellent results. At the following tournament in May he won the first gold star of his career by beating yokozuna Harumafuji on the 10th day. He slipped back into the second division after a run of poor performances in early 2016 but was immediately promoted back to the top ranks after a winning record in July. He lost his top division status once again after the January 2017 tournament, and despite a brief re-appearance in makuuchi July 2017, he remained in the jūryō division. A 6–9 record in September 2018 left him in danger of demotion to makushita for the first time since he became a sekitori in November 2009, and Gagamaru told reporters he would consult his stablemaster before deciding whether to continue wrestling. In the banzuke for November 2018 Gagamaru's rank was confirmed as makushita 1. He earned immediate promotion back to jūryō for January 2019 with a 5–2 record. He spent the rest of 2019 in jūryō but pulled out of the November tournament on Day 13 with only one win, ensuring demotion to makushita again. This absence ended his streak of 1050 matches from his professional debut.

== Retirement from sumo ==
He withdrew from the January 2020 tournament after losing his first two matches, and did not take part in any further tournaments in 2020, his rank falling to jonidan 46. He announced his retirement on Day 10 of the November 2020 tournament. At a press conference he gave chronic knee problems as the reason for his retirement, and said his most memorable matches were his kinboshi win over Harumafuji, and his 2011 win over ōzeki Baruto. Having been in Japan for 15 years, he plans to continue to live in the country.

Gagamaru's danpatsu-shiki (retirement ceremony) was held in Tokyo on 30 July 2022.

== Fighting style ==
Gagamaru was an oshi-sumo specialist who mainly employed pushing and thrusting techniques. His most common winning kimarite were oshi-dashi or push out. Peaking at 212 kg in November 2013, he was one of the heaviest men in sumo. He disliked attention being paid to his weight however, and missed several official weigh-ins over the course of his career.

== Personal life ==
On the day of his retirement ceremony in July 2022, Gagamaru announced that he had married a Japanese woman in her thirties whom he had been dating since 2015. He also announced that he had been losing weight, dropping from 220 kg (490 lb) in March 2021 to 130 kg (290 lb) in July 2022. He said he had lost 70 kg during a three-month span in 2021. In October 2025, he announced that he was the father of a daughter born on September 10.

== Career record ==
Gagamaru Masaru
Year	January Hatsu basho, Tokyo	March Haru basho, Osaka	May Natsu basho, Tokyo	July Nagoya basho, Nagoya	September Aki basho, Tokyo	November Kyūshū basho, Fukuoka
2005	x	x	x	x	x	(Maezumo)
2006	West Jonokuchi #34; 7–0; Champion	East Jonidan #28; 6–1	West Sandanme #64; 4–3	West Sandanme #45; 5–2	West Sandanme #16; 5–2	West Makushita #55; 6–1
2007	West Makushita #24; 3–4	East Makushita #35; 3–4	West Makushita #46; 4–3	East Makushita #39; 3–4	East Makushita #48; 2–5	West Sandanme #12; 6–1
2008	West Makushita #35; 4–3	West Makushita #27; 3–4	East Makushita #35; 2–5	West Makushita #54; 4–3	West Makushita #43; 4–3	West Makushita #32; 6–1
2009	East Makushita #13; 6–1	East Makushita #3; 3–4	West Makushita #6; 4–3	West Makushita #5; 3–4	East Makushita #10; 7–0–P; Champion	East Jūryō #14; 8–7
2010	East Jūryō #13; 12–3; Champion	East Jūryō #3; 8–7	West Jūryō #1; 10–5	East Maegashira #12; 5–10	East Maegashira #15; 10–5	East Maegashira #10; 9–6
2011	West Maegashira #6; 5–10	East Maegashira #14; Tournament Cancelled; Match fixing investigation 0–0–0	East Maegashira #14; 8–7	West Maegashira #7; 5–10	West Maegashira #11; 11–4; F	West Maegashira #3; 2–13
2012	West Maegashira #10; 12–3; F	East Komusubi #1; 6–9	West Maegashira #2; 5–10	East Maegashira #7; 10–5	West Maegashira #2; 4–11	East Maegashira #7; 8–7
2013	East Maegashira #4; 6–9	East Maegashira #6; 5–10	West Maegashira #11; 11–4	West Maegashira #2; 3–12	East Maegashira #9; 6–9	West Maegashira #13; 8–7
2014	East Maegashira #12; 8–7	West Maegashira #9; 6–9	East Maegashira #14; 7–8	East Maegashira #15; 5–10	West Jūryō #3; 5–10	West Jūryō #5; 8–7
2015	West Jūryō #2; 11–4	West Maegashira #15; 11–4	East Maegashira #6; 7–8 ★	West Maegashira #6; 6–9	East Maegashira #9; 6–9	East Maegashira #11; 8–7
2016	West Maegashira #9; 7–8	East Maegashira #10; 5–10	East Maegashira #15; 6–9	East Jūryō #1; 8–7	East Maegashira #12; 5–10	East Maegashira #16; 8–7
2017	East Maegashira #13; 5–10	East Jūryō #2; 7–8	East Jūryō #3; 9–6	East Maegashira #16; 3–12	West Jūryō #7; 5–10	East Jūryō #12; 10–5
2018	West Jūryō #5; 8–7	East Jūryō #5; 8–7	West Jūryō #2; 4–11	West Jūryō #9; 7–8	East Jūryō #12; 6–9	East Makushita #1; 5–2
2019	East Jūryō #14; 8–7	East Jūryō #8; 8–7	East Jūryō #7; 9–6	West Jūryō #2; 3–12	East Jūryō #10; 6–9	West Jūryō #12; 1–12–2
2020	East Makushita #9; 0–3–4	West Makushita #44; Sat out due to injury 0–0–7	East Sandanme #28; Tournament Cancelled; State of Emergency; 0–0–0	East Sandanme #28; Sat out due to injury 0–0–7	West Sandanme #85; Sat out due to injury 0–0–7	East Jonidan #46; Retired; 0–0–5
Record given as wins–losses–absences Top division champion Top division runner-up Retired Lower divisions Non-participation Sanshō key: F=Fighting spirit; O=Outstanding performance; T=Technique Also shown: ★=Kinboshi; P=Playoff(s); Divisions: Makuuchi — Jūryō — Makushita — Sandanme — Jonidan — Jonokuchi Makuuchi ranks: Yokozuna — Ōzeki — Sekiwake — Komusubi — Maegashira

== See also ==
- List of sumo tournament top division runners-up
- List of sumo tournament second division champions
- Glossary of sumo terms
- List of past sumo wrestlers
- List of non-Japanese sumo wrestlers
- List of komusubi
