= Higonoumi Naoya =

Japanese sumo wrestler (born 1969)

Personal information
- Native name: 肥後ノ海 直哉
- Born: Naoto Sakamoto; 23 September 1969 (age 57) Kumamoto, Japan
- Height: 1.83 m (6 ft 0 in)
- Weight: 143 kg (315 lb)

Sport
- Sport: Sumo
- University team: Nihon University
- Retired: November, 2002
- Heya: Mihogaseki
- Record: 407-476-83
- Debut: January, 1992
- Highest rank: Maegashira 1 (May, 1995)
- Elder name: Kise
- Championships: 1 (Makushita)
- Gold Stars: 2 Akebono; Takanohana II
- Updated on August 2010

Higonoumi Naoya (born 23 September 1969 as Naoto Sakamoto) is a former sumo wrestler from Kumamoto, Japan. After his retirement he opened up Kise stable.

== Career ==
A former amateur champion at Nihon University, he turned professional in 1992, joining Mihogaseki stable and making his debut in the makushita division as a makushita tsukedashi entrant. Initially fighting under the shikona of Sakamotoyama, he lost only two bouts in his first three tournaments, reaching the jūryō division in July 1992 and the top makuuchi division in February 1993. He was ranked in the top division for 53 consecutive tournaments, every one as a maegashira. This remains a record for a wrestler that never reached the san'yaku ranks, although Kyokushūzan later had more consecutive tournaments as a maegashira after his single tournament as a komusubi. He earned two kinboshi for defeating yokozuna - Akebono in May 1995 and Takanohana in March 1999. He fell back to the jūryō division at the end of 2001 and retired a year later in November 2002 at the age of 33.

== Retirement from sumo ==
He remained in sumo as a coach under the elder name of Kise, and opened up his own training stable, also called Kise, in December 2003. He produced the top division wrestlers Kiyoseumi in 2008 and Gagamaru in 2010. In May 2010 Kise was demoted two ranks by the Sumo Association after he was found to have made arrangements for the distribution of tickets to the previous July's Nagoya tournament that ended up in the hands of around 50 high-profile yakuza affiliated to the Yamaguchi-gumi crime syndicate. As a result, Kise stable closed down and Kise and all his wrestlers moved to Kitanoumi stable, where Higonoumi worked as an assistant coach. He has admitted that until around 2007 he had ties with a yakuza member. He was allowed to re–open Kise stable in April 2012, and in September of that year his wrestler Jōkōryū earned promotion to makuuchi in a record nine tournaments from jonokuchi. He has since produced a number of other sekitori including Hidenoumi, Tokushōryū and Ura.

Higonoumi was demoted in sumo's hierarchy in December 2025 for violation of supervisory duties over an incident involving two lower-division wrestlers at his stable the month before.

In September 2026, it was revealed that Higonoumi had received a Kazakh medal for his work as the coach of Kinbōzan, one of his protégés from Kazakhstan whom he had raised to the makuuchi division.

== Fighting style ==
Higonoumi's most common winning kimarite or techniques were basic and straightforward ones: yorikiri, a force out, and oshidashi, push out. He also regularly used hatakikomi (slap down), okuridashi (push out from behind), tsukiotoshi (thrust over) and uwatedashinage (pulling overarm throw).

== Career record ==
Higonoumi Naoya
Year	January Hatsu basho, Tokyo	March Haru basho, Osaka	May Natsu basho, Tokyo	July Nagoya basho, Nagoya	September Aki basho, Tokyo	November Kyūshū basho, Fukuoka
1992	Makushita tsukedashi #60; 6–1	East Makushita #31; 6–1	East Makushita #13; 7–0; Champion	West Jūryō #10; 8–7	West Jūryō #8; 9–6	West Jūryō #5; 8–7
1993	West Jūryō #3; 9–6	East Maegashira #16; 9–6	West Maegashira #9; 7–8	West Maegashira #11; 8–7	East Maegashira #5; 6–9	East Maegashira #7; 5–10
1994	East Maegashira #13; 8–7	West Maegashira #8; 9–6	East Maegashira #2; 4–11	West Maegashira #9; 8–7	West Maegashira #4; 6–9	West Maegashira #6; 4–11
1995	West Maegashira #13; 8–7	West Maegashira #10; 10–5	West Maegashira #1; 6–7–2 ★	East Maegashira #3; Sat out due to injury 0–0–15	East Maegashira #3; 4–11	West Maegashira #8; 6–9
1996	East Maegashira #14; 9–6	East Maegashira #3; 4–11	East Maegashira #9; 6–9	East Maegashira #14; 9–6	West Maegashira #8; 7–8	West Maegashira #10; 9–6
1997	West Maegashira #4; 5–10	West Maegashira #8; 7–8	West Maegashira #9; 8–7	West Maegashira #3; 2–13	West Maegashira #12; 8–7	West Maegashira #5; 6–9
1998	West Maegashira #8; 5–10	East Maegashira #14; 9–6	East Maegashira #9; 8–7	West Maegashira #6; 6–9	West Maegashira #10; 9–6	East Maegashira #2; 4–11
1999	West Maegashira #7; 8–7	East Maegashira #4; 6–9 ★	East Maegashira #7; 8–7	West Maegashira #3; 2–13	West Maegashira #11; 8–7	West Maegashira #7; 8–7
2000	East Maegashira #3; 2–5–8	West Maegashira #11; Sat out due to injury 0–0–15	West Maegashira #11; 9–6	East Maegashira #5; 4–11	West Maegashira #12; 10–5	West Maegashira #2; 5–10
2001	East Maegashira #7; 7–8	West Maegashira #8; 6–9	East Maegashira #11; 11–4	West Maegashira #2; 3–12	East Maegashira #9; 5–10	West Maegashira #13; 4–8–2
2002	West Jūryō #4; Sat out due to injury 0–0–15	West Jūryō #4; 9–6	East Jūryō #1; 4–4–7	West Jūryō #6; Sat out due to injury 0–0–15	West Jūryō #6; 4–11	West Jūryō #13; Retired; 2–10
Record given as wins–losses–absences Top division champion Top division runner-up Retired Lower divisions Non-participation Sanshō key: F=Fighting spirit; O=Outstanding performance; T=Technique Also shown: ★=Kinboshi; P=Playoff(s); Divisions: Makuuchi — Jūryō — Makushita — Sandanme — Jonidan — Jonokuchi Makuuchi ranks: Yokozuna — Ōzeki — Sekiwake — Komusubi — Maegashira

== See also ==
- Glossary of sumo terms
- List of past sumo wrestlers
- List of sumo elders
