= Ōrora Satoshi =

Russian sumo wrestler (born 1983)

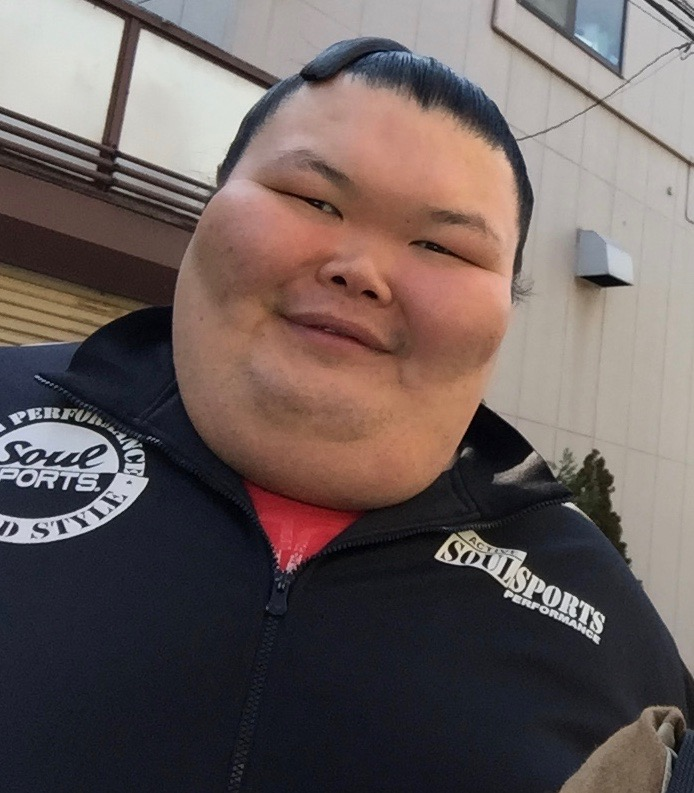
- Ōrora in 2016

Personal information
- Native name: 大露羅敏
- Born: Anatoliy Valeryevich Mikhakhanov; April 26, 1983 (age 43) Zaigrayevo, Buryat ASSR, Soviet Union
- Height: 1.90 m (6 ft 3 in)
- Weight: 292.6 kg (645 lb; 46.08 st)

Sport
- Sport: Sumo
- Retired: September 2018
- Heya: Yamahibiki, formerly Kitanoumi
- Record: 376–382–12
- Debut: March 2000
- Highest rank: Makushita 43 (November 2011)
- Updated on Sept 21, 2018

Ōrora Satoshi (born April 26, 1983 as Anatoliy Valeryevich Mikhakhanov, Russian: Анатолий Валерьевич Михаханов) is a Russian former sumo wrestler. His highest rank was makushita 43. In 2017, he became the heaviest professional sumo wrestler ever by reaching the weight of 288 kilograms (635 lb), surpassing the record previously held by Konishiki. He reached a peak weight of 292.6 kilograms (645 lb). He decided to retire from sumo in September 2018.

== Career ==
He was born on April 26, 1983, in the small town of Zaigrayevo, Zaigrayevsky District, Buryatia in the Soviet Union. He had been extraordinarily large since childhood, and after seeing sumo on television for the first time at the age of eight he was inspired to become a sumo wrestler. In 1999 at the age of 16 he moved with his family to St. Petersburg so he could study sumo.

There he was scouted by the 55th yokozuna Kitanoumi, joining Kitanoumi stable in March 2000. He was the first Russian to enter professional sumo. He made his debut alongside Ryūō, Hōchiyama and Hitenryu. He was given the shikona of Ōrora, a reference to the aurora.

Ōrora spent most of his career in the fourth-highest sandanme division, which he first reached in May 2002. He had nine tournaments ranked in the third-highest makushita division, which he first reached in January 2008, peaking at Makushita 43 East in November 2011. His last appearance in the division was in January 2014. He served as a tsukebito or personal attendant to Kitanoumi for fourteen years until his stablemaster's death in November 2015, upon which his stable was renamed Yamahibiki with the former maegashira Ganyū becoming his stablemaster. His career record was 376 wins against 382 losses, with 12 absences due to injury, over 111 tournaments.

=== Weight ===
Ōrora already weighed 190 kilograms (420 lb) on his debut in March 2000, and in 2010 reached 262 kg (578 lb), surpassing Yamamotoyama to be the second-heaviest sumo wrestler recorded. He recalled on one occasion ordering 50 servings of yakiniku, plus six bowls of ramen noodles. After reaching 283 kg (624 lb) in the January 2017 health check-up he tried changing his diet, eating only once a day and taking more exercise by walking around his heya. He did not check his weight on a scale until the next health check-up on 22 August 2017. In the seven months since he had, he increased his weight by another five kilograms, to reach 288 kg (635 lb), surpassing former ōzeki Konishiki's 285 kg (628 lb) set in 1996, becoming the heaviest wrestler ever in professional sumo.

Ōrora remarked that he had not been aiming for the record, but at least would now have a place in history. He joked that a rice ball eaten as a snack must have put him over. In a Twitter post on April 6, 2018, Ōrora stated that his weight had increased to 294 kilograms (648 lb). His peak weight officially recorded by the Sumo Association was 292.6 kilograms (645 lb), just before his retirement.

== Retirement ==
In September 2017, he was demoted to jonidan, a division in which he had not competed since 2003. In September 2018 he announced his retirement after winning his final match, to give him a 1–6 record at the rank of jonidan 12. Speaking to reporters he paid tribute to his late stablemaster Kitanoumi, and said his most memorable match was his victory over a young Hakuhō in September 2001. After a retirement ceremony at his stable, he returned to Russia on October 7, 2018. He was planning to find a job in sports events.

Based once again in his hometown in Siberia, he has a large social media following. He announced on his Instagram account in April 2020 that since retiring he had lost 100 kg. Speaking to the Asahi Shimbun in June 2020, said he had now switched to five small meals a day, does not eat after 7 pm, walks 6 kilometres a day and goes to a gym. He said that it was difficult to stay healthy while living in a sumo stable as "you are the only person that can take care of you. Nobody in your sumo stable cares about you." While active he suffered from hypertension and fatigue, and would require an oxygen tank for taking short walks.

== Fighting style ==
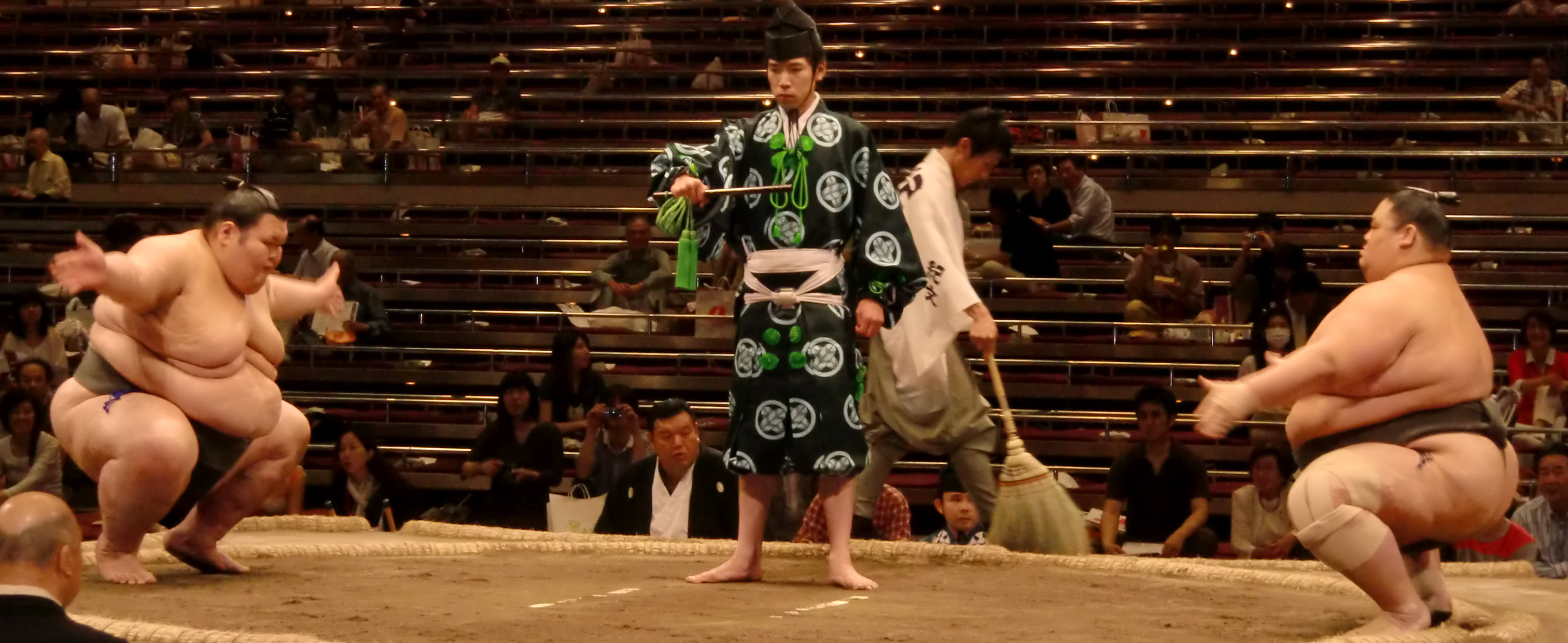
Ōrora (left) faces Kainowaka, September 2009

Ōrora had a huge weight advantage over nearly all his opponents—his 190 kg (420 lb) advantage over the 83 kg (183 lb) wrestler Ohara in January 2012 was the largest disparity ever in a professional sumo bout, though in this bout he was beaten by the smaller wrestler when stepping out of the ring during a throw attempt. On the twelfth day of the September 2001 tournament he won with the extremely rare technique of tsukaminage or lifting throw, which can only be achieved against opponents much lighter than oneself, and had not been seen in a tournament since Tokitsuyama won with it in November 1957.

He also enjoyed employing the rare kimarite of kimedashi, or arm-barring force-out, and was credited with this technique 41 times as of July 2017, by far the most among his contemporaries. His most common winning technique was a straightforward force out or yori-kiri. However, Ōrora was severely restricted by his lack of speed and agility, and only won around half his bouts. Many of his opponents simply circled him, waiting for him to tire.

== Career record ==
- Note: Six official basho or tournaments are held each year—the Hatsu (First), Haru (Spring), Natsu (Summer), Nagoya, Aki (Autumn) and Kyushu. Wrestlers in lower divisions fight seven bouts per tournament.

Ōrora Satoshi
Year	January Hatsu basho, Tokyo	March Haru basho, Osaka	May Natsu basho, Tokyo	July Nagoya basho, Nagoya	September Aki basho, Tokyo	November Kyūshū basho, Fukuoka
2000	x	(Maezumo)	East Jonokuchi #20; 3–4	West Jonokuchi #23; 6–1	East Jonidan #75; 2–5	East Jonidan #99; 4–3
2001	East Jonidan #75; 3–4	East Jonidan #89; 4–3	West Jonidan #65; 3–4	West Jonidan #78; 3–4	East Jonidan #95; 6–1	East Jonidan #17; 3–4
2002	West Jonidan #35; 4–3	East Jonidan #14; 4–3	West Sandanme #94; 2–5	West Jonidan #16; 2–5	East Jonidan #50; 6–1	East Sandanme #85; 5–2
2003	West Sandanme #56; 3–4	West Sandanme #74; Sat out due to injury 0–0–7	West Jonidan #34; 5–2	West Sandanme #98; 2–5	West Jonidan #31; 5–2	West Sandanme #96; 4–3
2004	East Sandanme #74; 3–4	West Sandanme #89; 4–3	West Sandanme #70; 4–3	West Sandanme #52; 1–6	West Sandanme #92; 6–1	East Sandanme #34; 3–4
2005	West Sandanme #47; 4–3	East Sandanme #31; 4–3	East Sandanme #19; 4–3	East Sandanme #9; 2–5	East Sandanme #33; 4–3	West Sandanme #17; 4–3
2006	East Sandanme #4; 2–5	East Sandanme #24; 2–5	West Sandanme #50; 5–2	East Sandanme #20; 2–5	West Sandanme #49; 5–2	East Sandanme #20; 4–3
2007	West Sandanme #7; 3–4	East Sandanme #24; 4–3	East Sandanme #10; 3–4	West Sandanme #22; 3–4	East Sandanme #38; 5–2	West Sandanme #13; 5–2
2008	East Makushita #53; 2–5	West Sandanme #10; 1–6	West Sandanme #44; 5–2	West Sandanme #19; 5–2	East Makushita #58; 4–3	West Makushita #48; 1–6
2009	West Sandanme #21; 5–2	West Makushita #58; 3–4	East Sandanme #12; 5–2	East Makushita #50; 3–4	West Sandanme #6; 1–6	East Sandanme #42; 3–4
2010	West Sandanme #59; 4–2	East Sandanme #43; 6–1	West Makushita #55; 1–6	West Sandanme #27; 4–3	West Sandanme #14; 2–5	West Sandanme #36; 4–3
2011	West Sandanme #23; 3–4	East Sandanme #41; Tournament Cancelled; Match fixing investigation 0–0–0	East Sandanme #41; 4–3	West Sandanme #16; 5–2	East Makushita #58; 5–2	East Makushita #43; 2–5
2012	West Sandanme #4; 1–6	West Sandanme #39; 3–4	West Sandanme #56; 5–2	West Sandanme #26; 3–4	East Sandanme #43; 5–2	East Sandanme #16; 2–5
2013	East Sandanme #42; 3–4	East Sandanme #57; 5–2	East Sandanme #29; 3–4	East Sandanme #43; 4–3	East Sandanme #30; 5–2	West Sandanme #5; 4–3
2014	West Makushita #54; 2–5	West Sandanme #16; 2–5	East Sandanme #46; 3–4	East Sandanme #62; 6–1	East Sandanme #8; 3–4	East Sandanme #25; 4–3
2015	West Sandanme #12; 4–3	East Sandanme #2; 2–5	West Sandanme #33; 2–5	West Sandanme #57; 5–2	West Sandanme #28; 2–5	East Sandanme #58; 4–3
2016	East Sandanme #40; 2–5	East Sandanme #70; 2–5	East Sandanme #94; 5–2	West Sandanme #59; 4–3	East Sandanme #41; 3–4	East Sandanme #57; 4–3
2017	West Sandanme #38; 4–3	East Sandanme #27; 2–5	East Sandanme #59; 3–4	West Sandanme #80; 3–4	West Jonidan #1; 3–4	East Jonidan #13; 5–2
2018	East Sandanme #77; 0–2–5	East Jonidan #28; 2–5	East Jonidan #61; 4–3	East Jonidan #35; 4–3	West Jonidan #12; Retired; 1–6	x
Record given as wins–losses–absences Top division champion Top division runner-up Retired Lower divisions Non-participation Sanshō key: F=Fighting spirit; O=Outstanding performance; T=Technique Also shown: ★=Kinboshi; P=Playoff(s); Divisions: Makuuchi — Jūryō — Makushita — Sandanme — Jonidan — Jonokuchi Makuuchi ranks: Yokozuna — Ōzeki — Sekiwake — Komusubi — Maegashira

== See also ==
- List of past sumo wrestlers
- List of heaviest sumo wrestlers
- List of non-Japanese sumo wrestlers
