= Susanoumi Yoshitaka =

Japanese sumo wrestler

Susanoumi Yoshitaka (須佐の湖 善誉), born August 30, 1972, and known by his shikona Susanoumi (須佐の湖) is a Japanese retired sumo wrestler from the city of Chita in Aichi Prefecture. His sumo stable was Kitanoumi. His real name is Zenji Kanesaku. His height is 184 cm (6 ft) and his peak weight was 240 kg. His highest rank was jūryō 2, achieved in the January 1998 wrestling tournament (basho in Japanese). One of his best results was in the November 1999 tournament in Kyushu when he defeated Hayateumi and Kotomitsuki. His hobby is sleeping. After retirement he ran a restaurant in Fukuoka near his in-laws' home, but thereafter closed it and worked as a security guard in Kyushu.

At a peak weight of 240 kg (530 lb) reached in 1998, Susanoumi ranks seventh on the list of heaviest sumo wrestlers. He was the heaviest Japanese-born sumo wrestler until surpassed by Yamamotoyama, who peaked at 266 kg (586 lb) in 2010.

== Career record ==
Susanoumi Yoshitaka
Year	January Hatsu basho, Tokyo	March Haru basho, Osaka	May Natsu basho, Tokyo	July Nagoya basho, Nagoya	September Aki basho, Tokyo	November Kyūshū basho, Fukuoka
1988	x	(Maezumo)	West Jonokuchi #28; 5–2	East Jonidan #113; 4–3	East Jonidan #82; 2–5	East Jonidan #112; 5–2
1989	West Jonidan #66; 2–5	East Jonidan #98; 4–3	West Jonidan #69; 3–4	East Jonidan #94; 6–1	West Jonidan #24; 7–0	East Sandanme #34; 4–3
1990	West Sandanme #19; 2–5	East Sandanme #48; 2–5	East Sandanme #81; 5–2	East Sandanme #51; 4–3	East Sandanme #34; 4–3	East Sandanme #15; 3–4
1991	East Sandanme #30; 4–3	East Sandanme #15; 5–2	West Makushita #50; 4–3	East Makushita #35; 5–2	West Makushita #20; 3–4	West Makushita #25; 3–4
1992	West Makushita #36; 1–6	West Sandanme #5; 3–4	West Sandanme #23; 4–3	West Sandanme #8; 7–0; Champion	East Makushita #9; 4–3	West Makushita #4; 4–3
1993	West Makushita #1; 3–4	West Makushita #4; 3–4	West Makushita #9; 4–3	East Makushita #4; 5–2	East Jūryō #13; 3–12	East Makushita #9; 0–4–3
1994	East Makushita #44; Sat out due to injury 0–0–7	East Makushita #44; 5–2	East Makushita #28; 5–2	West Makushita #15; 2–5	East Makushita #34; 3–4	West Makushita #45; 5–2
1995	East Makushita #27; 4–3	West Makushita #19; 2–5	East Makushita #34; 2–5	West Makushita #52; 6–1	East Makushita #25; 5–2	West Makushita #13; 3–4
1996	West Makushita #17; 6–1	West Makushita #3; 2–5	East Makushita #14; 4–3	West Makushita #9; 6–1; Champion	East Makushita #3; 4–3	West Makushita #1; 3–4
1997	East Makushita #4; 3–4	East Makushita #11; 4–3	West Makushita #6; 4–3	East Makushita #4; 7–0; Champion	East Jūryō #11; 8–7	West Jūryō #6; 10–5
1998	East Jūryō #2; 5–10	West Jūryō #6; 5–10	East Jūryō #10; 9–6	East Jūryō #5; 8–7	East Jūryō #3; 4–11	West Jūryō #12; 8–7
1999	East Jūryō #11; 8–7	West Jūryō #8; 7–8	West Jūryō #10; 9–6	West Jūryō #6; 9–6	West Jūryō #2; 7–8	East Jūryō #4; 6–9
2000	East Jūryō #6; 8–7	West Jūryō #4; 4–11	East Jūryō #10; 2–13	East Makushita #8; 1–6	East Makushita #28; 3–4	East Makushita #36; 4–3
2001	West Makushita #27; 2–5	West Makushita #41; 5–2	East Makushita #27; 3–4	East Makushita #38; 5–2	West Makushita #23; 1–6	West Makushita #45; 3–4
2002	East Makushita #57; 4–3	West Makushita #47; 4–3	West Makushita #40; 3–4	West Makushita #49; 4–3	West Makushita #42; 3–4	East Makushita #50; 3–4
2003	East Sandanme #7; 4–3	East Makushita #56; Retired; 0–0–7	x	x	x	x
Record given as wins–losses–absences Top division champion Top division runner-up Retired Lower divisions Non-participation Sanshō key: F=Fighting spirit; O=Outstanding performance; T=Technique Also shown: ★=Kinboshi; P=Playoff(s); Divisions: Makuuchi — Jūryō — Makushita — Sandanme — Jonidan — Jonokuchi Makuuchi ranks: Yokozuna — Ōzeki — Sekiwake — Komusubi — Maegashira

== See also ==
- Glossary of sumo terms
- List of past sumo wrestlers
