= Asahi University =

Private university in Mizuho, Gifu Prefecture, Japan

Coordinates: 35°22′54″N 136°41′26″E

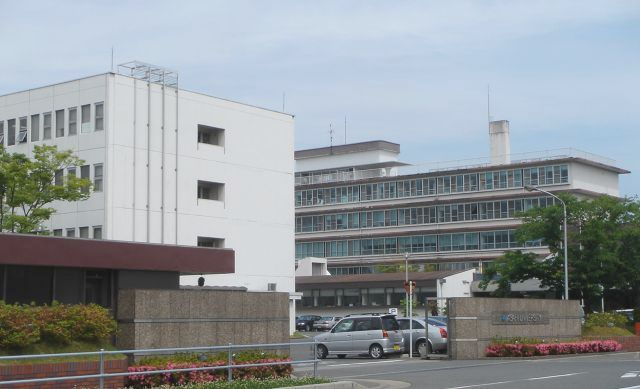
Asahi University

Asahi University (朝日大学, Asahi Daigaku) is a private university in Mizuho, Gifu Prefecture, Japan. The school was first founded in 1971 as Gifu Dental University (岐阜歯科大学 Gifu Shika Daigaku). It was renamed Asahi University in 1985 when the management department was added.

== Departments ==
=== Undergraduate ===
- Dentistry
- Education
- Law
- Management

=== Graduate ===
- Dentistry
- Management
- Law

== Sister university ==
- Meikai University
