= Hidenoumi Wataru =

Japanese sumo wrestler

Wataru Hidenoumi (秀ノ海 渡累, Hidenoumi Wataru), born November 20, 1965, and known by his shikona Hidenoumi (秀ノ海) is a Japanese retired sumo wrestler from the city of Kaizuka in Osaka Prefecture. His sumo stable was Mihogaseki. His real name is Wataru Maeda (前田渡). His height is 188 cm (6 ft 2 in) and his peak weight was 229 kg (505 lb). His highest rank was jūryō 9.

== Career record ==
Career results: 235 wins, 216 losses, 14 bouts missed due to injury (64 tournaments).

== Other points to note ==
His peak weight of 229 kilograms (505 pounds) means he ranks tenth in the list of heaviest sumo wrestlers.

== See also ==
- Glossary of sumo terms
- List of past sumo wrestlers
