= Kise stable (2003) =

Organization of sumo wrestlers

Coordinates: 35.6918°N 139.8000°E

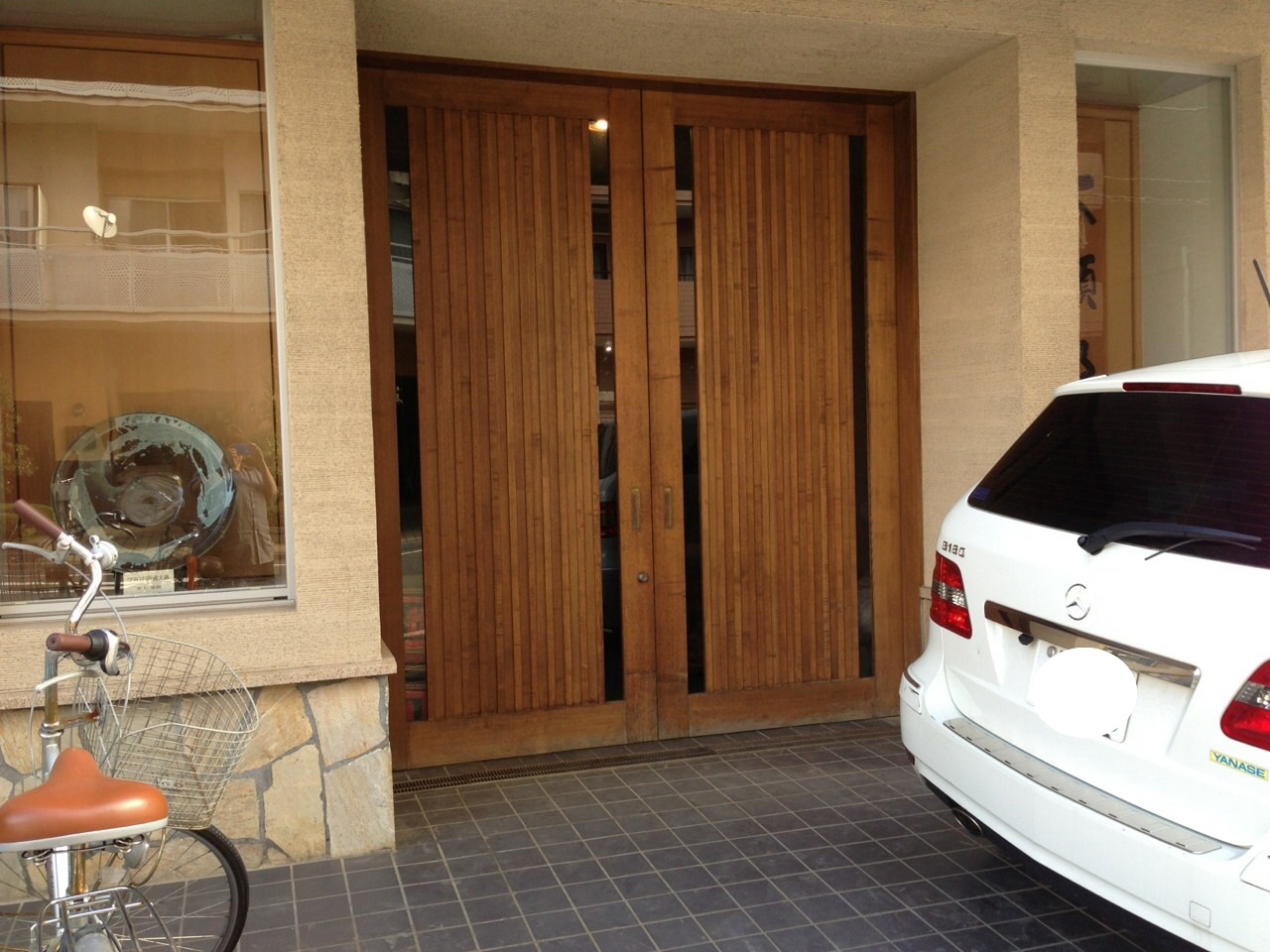

Kise stable (木瀬部屋, Kise-beya) is a stable of sumo wrestlers, part of the Dewanoumi ichimon or group of stables. It was established in its current form in December 2003 by former maegashira and Nihon University amateur champion Higonoumi, who branched off from Mihogaseki stable. The stable's first top division wrestler was Kiyoseumi in January 2008. Its foreign recruit, Georgian Gagamaru, in May 2010 earned promotion to the top division. It is a popular destination for wrestlers with collegiate sumo experience like its stablemaster.

Following the demotion of Kise stablemaster in May 2010 after a scandal involving the selling of tournament tickets to members of the yakuza, Kise stable was dissolved with all 27 of its wrestlers moving to the affiliated Kitanoumi stable. Kise was allowed to reestablish the stable in April 2012. All former members, as well as newcomers Jōkōryu and Sasanoyama (now Daiseiryū), joined the reconstituted stable. Jōkōryu reached the rank of komusubi in 2014, but has since fallen greatly down the ranks due to injury, and Daiseidō in September 2017 became the eleventh wrestler from Kise to reach jūryō since its founding in 2003. As of November 2023 Kise stable has 21 wrestlers, six of whom are sekitori.

Kise stable's first makuuchi championship was delivered by Tokushōryū in the January 2020 tournament. The 33-year-old won from the bottom-most makuuchi rank of maegashira 17, after spending all but one of the previous 12 tournaments in the jūryō division. Tokushōryū retired in 2023 and remained with Kise stable as a coach until April 2025, when he moved to Nishikido stable.

In May 2022 the stable recruited the first ever student of the University of Tokyo, an elite academic institution, to join professional sumo.

In December 2025 the Japan Sumo Association announced disciplinary action against stablemaster Kise (maegashira Higonoumi), demoting him in sumo's hierarchy from iin (委員, committee member) to toshiyori (年寄, elder) over an incident that took place in Kyushu prior to the start of the November 2025 sumo tournament. The investigation by the compliance committee revealed that a lower-division wrestler at the stable was angry after discovering that another wrestler had stolen money from his wallet, and punched him in the face "at least five or six times" with full force. The injured wrestler did not receive medical treatment, but withdrew from that month's tournament. The committee noted similar abuse between the same individuals in the past, concluding the incident in question was a "habitual offense." The attacking wrestler's retirement papers were accepted, with the Sumo Association noting that they would have issued a two-tournament suspension had he stayed. Kise, meanwhile, did not initially report the incident to the association, and was subsequently disciplined for violation of supervisory duties. It was also noted that Kise had a prior disciplinary record.

As of May 2026, the stable has 18 active wrestlers.

== Ring name conventions ==
Some wrestlers at this stable take ring names or shikona that begin with the characters 肥後 (read: higo), in honor of their coach and the stable's owner, the former Higonoumi. The best known is former jūryō wrestler Higonojō. Some other low-ranking members are Higoarashi, Higonoryū, and Higohikari.

== Owner ==
- 2003–2010, 2012–present: 11th Kimura Sehei - abbreviated Kise (toshiyori, maegashira Higonoumi)

== Coach ==
- Inagawa Yūki (iin, komusubi Futen'ō)
- Wakafuji Nobuhide (iin, maegashira Ōtsukasa)

== Notable active wrestlers ==
- Ura (best rank komusubi)
- Churanoumi (best rank komusubi)
- Shimanoumi (best rank maegashira)
- Kinbōzan (best rank maegashira)
- Kazuma (best rank maegashira)
- Himukamaru (best rank jūryō)

== Notable former members ==
- Gagamaru (former komusubi)
- Jōkōryū (former komusubi)
- Tokushōryū (former maegashira)
- Hidenoumi (former maegashira)
- Akiseyama (former maegashira)
- Kiyoseumi (former maegashira)
- Shiden (former jūryō)
- Kizenryū (former jūryō)
- Tokushinhō (former jūryō)
- Higonojō (former jūryō)
- Kizakiumi (former jūryō)
- Daiseiryū (former jūryō

== Usher ==
- Naoki (makushita yobidashi, real name Naoki Kitajima)

== Hairdresser ==
- Tokokuma (second class tokoyama)

== Location and access ==
Tokyo, Sumida Ward, Tachikawa 1-16-8
5 minute walk from Morishita Station on the Toei Shinjuku Line

== See also ==
- List of sumo stables
- List of active sumo wrestlers
- List of past sumo wrestlers
- Glossary of sumo terms
