= Kazuma Torakaze =

Japanese sumo wrestler

Personal information
- Native name: 一意 虎風
- Born: Kazuma Kawabuchi; November 12, 2001 (age 25) Osaka, Osaka Prefecture, Japan
- Height: 1.85 m (6 ft 1 in)
- Weight: 205 kg (452 lb; 32.3 st)

Sport
- Sport: Sumo
- Rank: see below
- University team: Nihon University
- Heya: Kise
- Debut: July 2024
- Highest rank: Maegashira 15 (July 2026)
- Championships: 1 (Jūryō); 1 (Makushita); 1 (Sandanme); 1 (Jonokuchi)
- Updated on July 3, 2026

Medal record

Men's Sumo

Representing Japan

World Junior Sumo Championships
Gold medal – first place	2019, Osaka (Osaka) Japan	Heavyweight

Kazuma Torakaze (Japanese: 一意 虎風; born November 12, 2001 as Kazuma Kawabuchi (川渕 一意, Kawabuchi Kazuma)) is a Japanese professional sumo wrestler. Wrestling for Kise stable, his highest rank is maegashira.

== Early life ==
Kawabuchi began practicing sumo in elementary school, joining a club led by a former makushita wrestler who had belonged to Takanohana stable. In fourth grade, he won the National Elementary School Championship. In middle school, he enrolled at Kanazawa Municipal Saisei Junior High School in Ishikawa Prefecture. In his third year, he won the Japanese prefectural team championship. In high school, he attended Kanazawa Gakuin Senior High School and won the national individual championship in the under-100-kilogram weight class, as well as two national qualifying tournaments in Towada and Usa, Ōita. At the World Junior Championships, he won the heavyweight division. He then went on to study sociology at Nihon University and joined the sumo club. At university, he was notably a classmate of the future Yoshinofuji. In his freshman year, he placed third in the National University Championships in the over-135-kg division, third in the All-Japan Championships, and second in the Eastern Japan Freshman Championships. In his second year, he placed third in the All-Japan Student Championship in the over-135-kg division and third in the National Student Selection Tournament. Unfortunately, he tore the anterior cruciate ligament in his left knee during the All-Japan Intercollegiate Championships and had to take a year off to recover. He returned to competition for the National Collegiate Team Championships the following year. He had to wait until his fourth year before he could win other tournaments. Notably, he won the All Japan University Selection tournament in Usa and finished second at the Kyushu All Japan University tournament. He also won the Eastern Japan Student Championships in the over-135-kg weight class, the National Japanese Student Championships in the same weight class, the All Japan University Tournament in Kariya, and finally the National Sports Festival.

After graduating, he decided to become a professional sumo wrestler; his last two tournament victories qualified him for the rank of makushita tsukedashi. He chose to join Kise stable, where several alumni of Nihon University wrestle. Kawabuchi decided to use his legal first name Kazuma (一意) as his shikona, or ring name.

== Career ==
In his first tournament, Kazuma won four consecutive matches before losing his fifth match. He fell out of the ring, injured himself, and had to be wheeled out on a wheelchair, having apparently suffered an injury to his right knee. After a four-month suspension that saw him demoted to the jonokuchi division, Kazuma returned to competition and won the tournament on his comeback. During the September and November tournaments, Kazuma also won the sandanme and makushita championships, respectively. When the jūryō rankings were announced immediately following the tournament, it was announced that Kazuma's performance would be enough to promote him to the sekitori ranks for the January 2026 tournament. At the time of his promotion, Kazuma was the heaviest wrestler in that division, weighing 206 kg (454 lb). Kazuma competed in two tournaments in the jūryō division before finding himself in a position to potentially be promoted to the top division during the May tournament. During that tournament, Kazuma won the championship.

When the banzuke (rankings) for the July tournament was announced, it was revealed that Kazuma would be promoted to the makuuchi division. This promotion makes him the 24th wrestler from his stable to be promoted to the top division and the 45th from his university.

== Personal life ==
Kazuma is the middle child of three siblings. His older brother was also a sumo wrestler within Shikoroyama stable and competed under the shikona (ring name) Kawabuchi. His younger brother is a professional boxer and a multiple high school championship winner. His father passed away in August 2025.

== Career record ==
Kazuma Torakaze
Year	January Hatsu basho, Tokyo	March Haru basho, Osaka	May Natsu basho, Tokyo	July Nagoya basho, Nagoya	September Aki basho, Tokyo	November Kyūshū basho, Fukuoka
2024	x	x	x	Makushita tsukedashi #60; 4–1–2	West Makushita #49; Sat out due to injury 0–0–7	West Sandanme #29; Sat out due to injury 0–0–7
2025	West Jonidan #9; Sat out due to injury 0–0–7	East Jonidan #80; Sat out due to injury 0–0–7	East Jonokuchi #7; 7–0; Champion	East Jonidan #5; 6–1	East Sandanme #26; 7–0; Champion	West Makushita #15; 7–0; Champion
2026	West Jūryō #14; 8–7	East Jūryō #11; 10–5	East Jūryō #6; 12–3; Champion	West Maegashira #15; 5–10	West Jūryō #2; 6–9	East Jūryō #4; 2–13
Record given as wins–losses–absences Top division champion Top division runner-up Retired Non-participation Jūryō Lower divisions Sanshō key: F=Fighting spirit; O=Outstanding performance; T=Technique Also shown: ★=Kinboshi; P=Playoff(s); Divisions: Makuuchi — Jūryō — Makushita — Sandanme — Jonidan — Jonokuchi Makuuchi ranks: Yokozuna — Ōzeki — Sekiwake — Komusubi — Maegashira

== See also ==
- Glossary of sumo terms
- List of active sumo wrestlers
- List of sumo second division champions
