= Kiyoseumi Takayuki =

Sumo wrestler

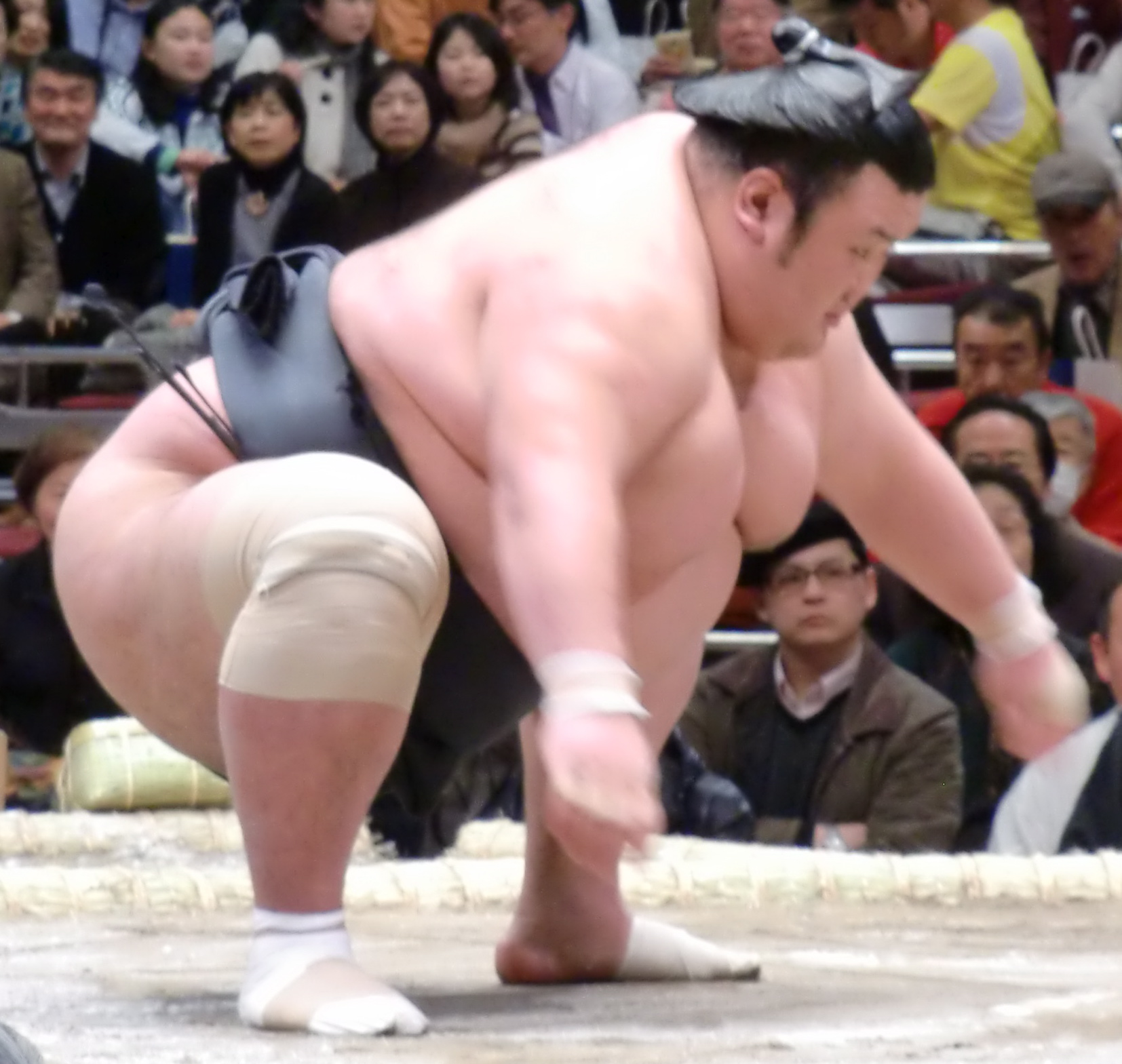

Personal information
- Born: Takayuki Ichihara; 16 August 1984 (age 42) Aichi, Japan
- Height: 1.82 m (5 ft 11 1/2 in)
- Weight: 180 kg (397 lb)

Sport
- Sport: Sumo
- University team: Nihon University
- Retired: April 2011
- Heya: Kise → Kitanoumi
- Record: 157-129-33
- Debut: January, 2007
- Highest rank: Maegashira 13 (March, 2008)
- Updated on Apr 2011

Takayuki Ichihara
Medal record

Men's Sumo

Representing Japan

World Games
Silver medal – second place	2005 Duisburg	Heavyweight
Gold medal – first place	2005 Duisburg	Open

Kiyoseumi Takayuki (born Takayuki Ichihara, 16 August 1984) is a former sumo wrestler from Nagoya, Japan. An extremely successful amateur, his highest rank in the professional sport was maegashira 13. He was forced to retire in April 2011 after an investigation by the Japan Sumo Association found him guilty of match-fixing.

== Career ==
Initially competing under his real surname of Ichihara, he was an amateur sumo champion at Nihon University, where he won eleven national titles. At the 2005 World Games, he won silver in the men's heavyweight division and gold in the men's open division. He won the Japan Games and the National Amateur Championships and was runner-up in the Japanese university championship. He was crowned the "Amateur Yokozuna" of 2006. He joined Kise stable, run by another former Nihon University champion, the ex-maegashira Higonoumi. Because of his amateur achievements, Ichihara was able to make his professional debut at the rank of makushita 10, the first makushita tsukedashi entrant to begin as high as the tenth rank.

After steady scores of five wins to two losses in his first two tournaments in January and March 2007, followed by 4–3 in May and July, he was promoted to the second jūryō division in November 2007 after a 6–1 at makushita 1 in September. He scored 13 wins to 2 losses, although he lost a playoff for the championship on the final day, and was immediately promoted to the top makuuchi division for January 2008. He was the first wrestler to make his makuuchi debut after spending only one tournament in jūryō since Daikiko in January 1991.

In his top division debut Ichihara won five of his first seven bouts but tired in the second week of the tournament, finishing with an 8–7 score. He injured his right knee on the opening day of the March 2008 tournament after losing to Homasho and had to withdraw. As a result, he was demoted all the way down to the rank of jūryō 11 for the May tournament. He participated in the tournament with his knee heavily strapped, and struggled to a make-koshi 7–8 score. In July he recovered from 0–5 down to post eight wins but withdrew on the final day after a recurrence of the injury.

He announced in December 2008 that he would be changing his shikona from his family name to Kiyoseumi for the January 2009 tournament. He produced a 9–6 score in his first tournament under his new name, but only a poor 4–11 in March. He managed a bare majority of wins in his next two tournaments, and remained near the bottom of the jūryō division for the rest of 2009.

He was suspended along with over a dozen other wrestlers from the July 2010 tournament after admitting involvement in illegal betting on baseball. As a result, he fell to the makushita division in September. After two 4–3 scores in makushita he returned to the jūryō division in January 2011.

== Match-fixing scandal and retirement ==
In February 2011, it was revealed that text-messages discovered on confiscated mobile phones implicated Kiyoseumi in match-fixing, as they appeared to show him agreeing to throw bouts in exchange for money. Unlike Kasuganishiki (the wrestler with whom the texts were exchanged), Chiyohakuhō and Enatsukasa who admitted their involvement, Kiyoseumi denied the allegations. However, the independent panel investigating the match-fixing claims stated that it could not deny his involvement based on the evidence. Of the 46 text messages discovered by the Metropolitan Police Department that mention match-fixing, 19 were either sent or received by Kiyoseumi. After an investigation by the Japan Sumo Association, he was one of 23 wrestlers found guilty of fixing the result of bouts and he was forced to retire in April 2011.

Following his retirement Ichihara opened a bar, Snack Ai, in Tokyo.

== Fighting style ==
Kiyoseumi was an oshi-sumo specialist, preferring pushing and thrusting techniques (tsuki/oshi). His most common winning kimarite was hatakikomi, the slap down.

He was one of the largest wrestlers in sumo, at 180 kg or 400 lb. Being so large, he lacked speed and mobility, and there were concerns that his knee injury further hampered his movement and held him back.

== Career record ==
Kiyoseumi Takayuki
Year	January Hatsu basho, Tokyo	March Haru basho, Osaka	May Natsu basho, Tokyo	July Nagoya basho, Nagoya	September Aki basho, Tokyo	November Kyūshū basho, Fukuoka
2007	Makushita tsukedashi #10; 5–2	East Makushita #4; 5–2	West Makushita #2; 4–3	West Makushita #1; 4–3	East Makushita #1; 6–1	East Jūryō #11; 13–2
2008	East Maegashira #16; 8–7	West Maegashira #13; 0–2–13	West Jūryō #11; 7–8	West Jūryō #12; 8–7	West Jūryō #10; 6–4–5	East Jūryō #14; 8–7
2009	East Jūryō #13; 9–6	West Jūryō #6; 4–11	West Jūryō #12; 8–7	West Jūryō #11; 8–7	West Jūryō #9; 7–8	West Jūryō #11; 8–7
2010	West Jūryō #10; 9–6	West Jūryō #5; 5–10	East Jūryō #10; 10–5	West Jūryō #4; Suspended; 0–0–15	West Makushita #4; 4–3	East Makushita #1; 4–3
2011	East Jūryō #11; 7–8	Tournament Cancelled; 0–0–0	West Jūryō #11; Retired –	x	x	x
Record given as wins–losses–absences Top division champion Top division runner-up Retired Lower divisions Non-participation Sanshō key: F=Fighting spirit; O=Outstanding performance; T=Technique Also shown: ★=Kinboshi; P=Playoff(s); Divisions: Makuuchi — Jūryō — Makushita — Sandanme — Jonidan — Jonokuchi Makuuchi ranks: Yokozuna — Ōzeki — Sekiwake — Komusubi — Maegashira

== See also ==
- Glossary of sumo terms
- List of past sumo wrestlers
