= Yamahibiki stable =

Organization of sumo wrestlers

Coordinates: 35.6825°N 139.7951°E

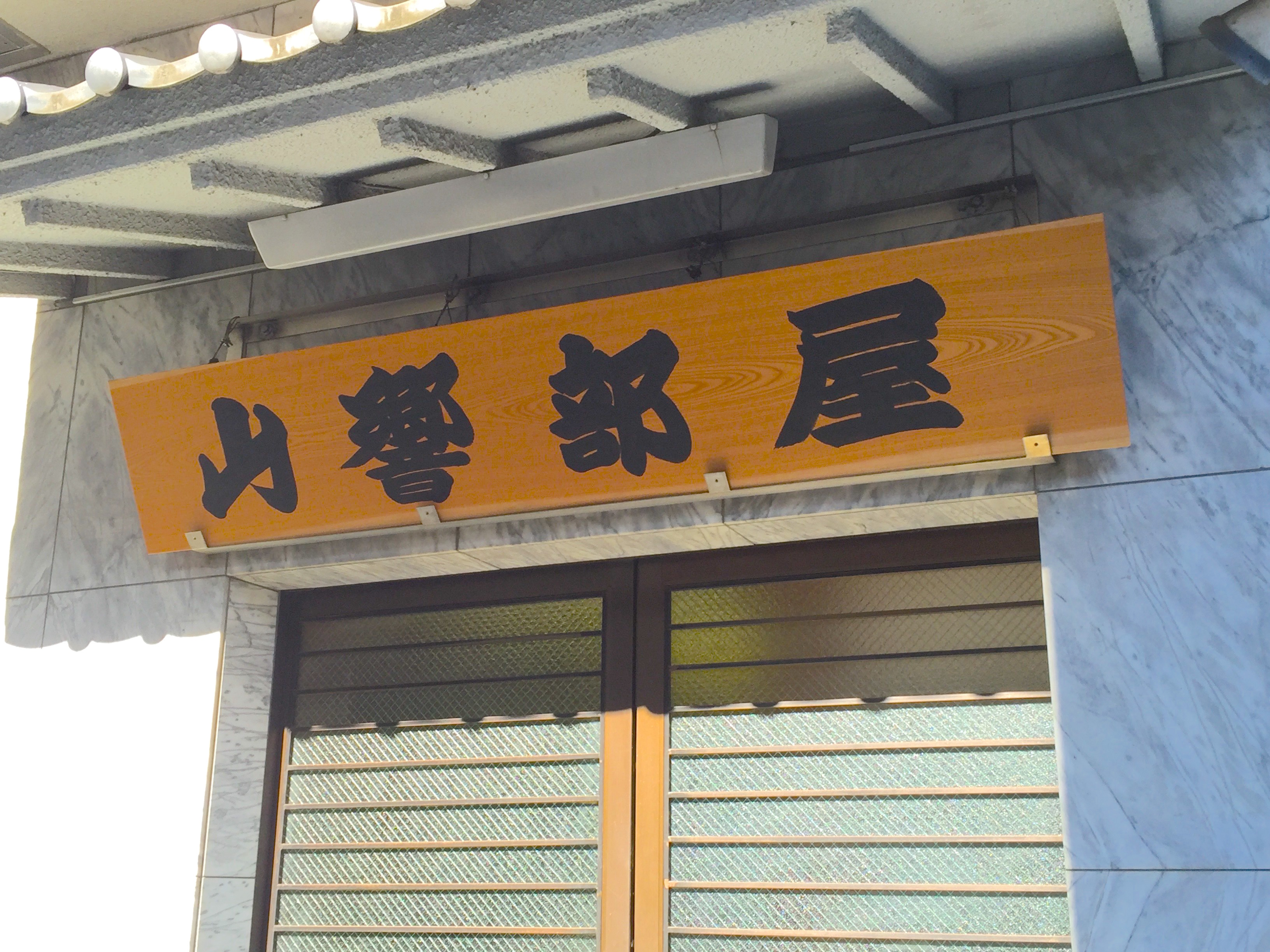

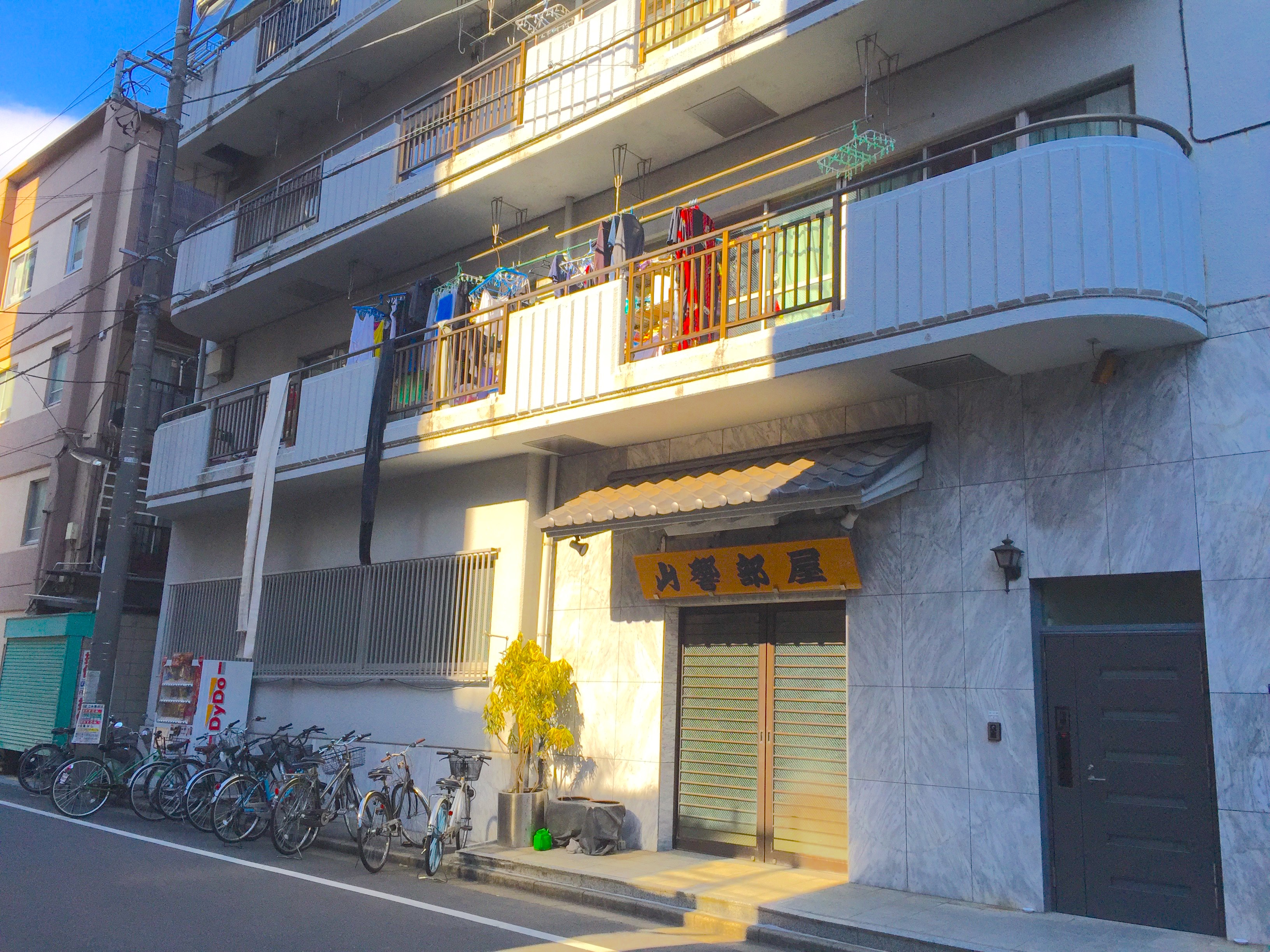

Yamahibiki stable (山響部屋, Yamahibiki-beya) is a stable of sumo wrestlers, part of the Dewanoumi ichimon or group of stables. It was set up in 1985 as Kitanoumi stable by former yokozuna Kitanoumi, who branched off from Mihogaseki stable. It absorbed Hatachiyama stable in 2006, following the death of its head coach, ōzeki Hokuten'yū. In May 2010 it also absorbed Kise stable, which was forced to close after its stablemaster, maegashira Higonoumi, was implicated in the selling of tournament tickets to yakuza members. As a result of this move the stable had 46 wrestlers, making it by some margin the largest stable in sumo at this time. It was the first stable to have over 40 wrestlers since Futagoyama stable in 1998, and had difficulty in finding room for so many. As a result, Kise was allowed to reestablish the stable in April 2012, and all former members of Kise stable, as well as newcomers Jōkōryū and Sasanoyama who had been recruited by Kise, joined the reconstituted stable again.

As of May 2026, the stable has 13 active wrestlers.

Stablemaster Kitanoumi died of colorectal cancer and multiple organ failure on the evening of November 20, 2015. Former maegashira Ganyū, who had been serving as a coach at the stable, inherited it. The stable was renamed Yamahibiki, the elder name used by Ganyū, since the Kitanoumi name could not be inherited, due to it being a one-generation elder stock, ichidai-toshiyori. As of June 2025, Yamahibiki stable had 15 wrestlers. Following the demotion of Kitataiki after July 2017 tournament and Kitaharima after September 2017 tournament, it had no sekitori for the first time since May 2003.

== Ring name conventions ==
A few wrestlers at this stable take ring names or shikona that begin with the character 北 (read: kita or hoku), meaning north, in deference to the stable's former owner, Kitanoumi. Some examples are Kitaharima, Kitataiki and Hokuseikai.

== Owner ==
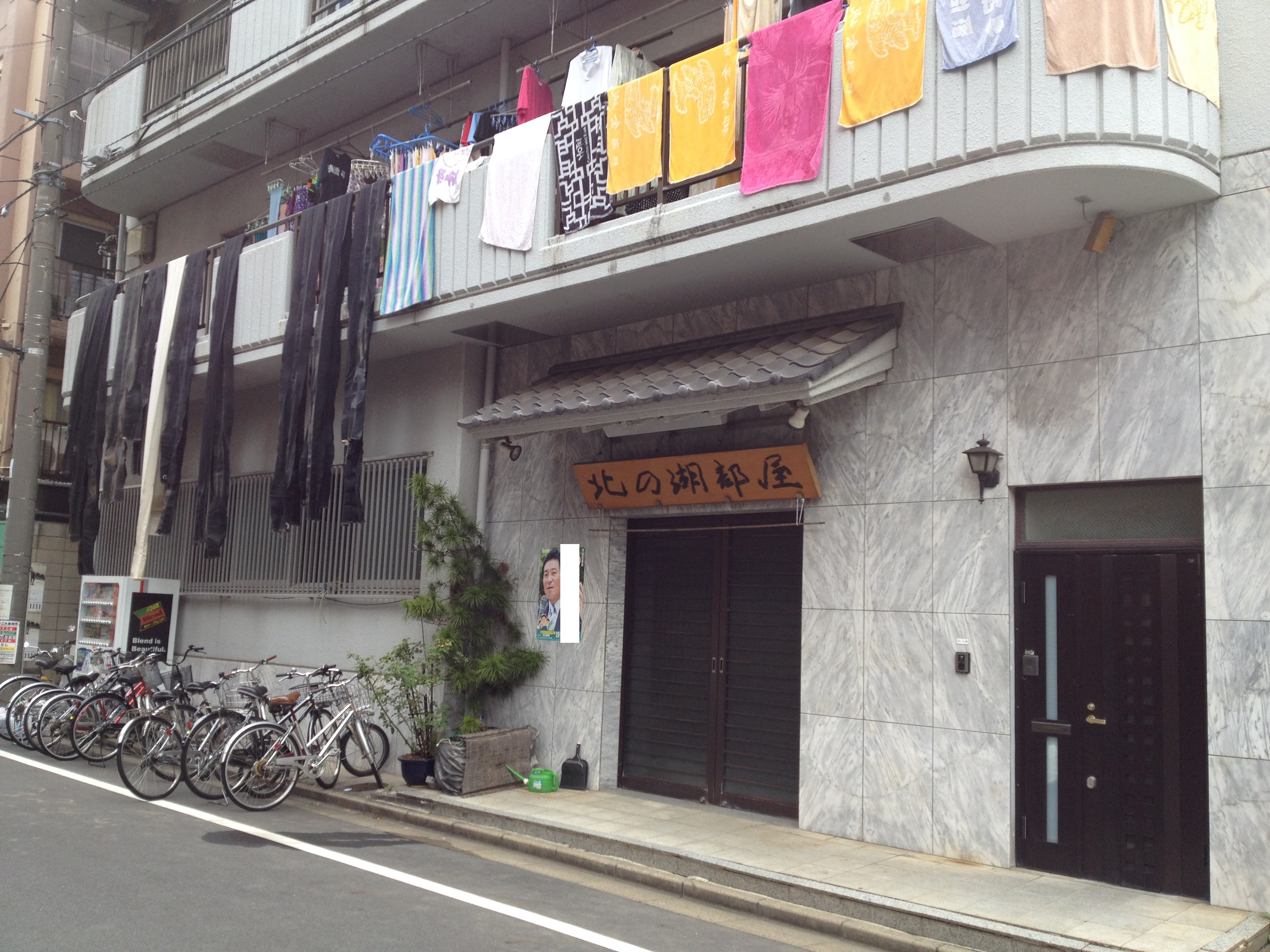
Stable with sign from Kitanoumi's tenure as owner

- 2015–present: Yamahibiki (yakuin taigū iin, maegashira Ganyū, born 1970)
- 1985–2015: Kitanoumi (rijichō, 55th yokozuna Kitanoumi, 1953–2015)

== Coaches ==
- Onogawa Akeyoshi (iin, maegashira Kitataiki, born 1982)

== Assistant ==
- Tochinoyama (sewanin, makushita 2, real name Dr. Hiroshi Yamada, born 1973)

== Notable active wrestlers ==
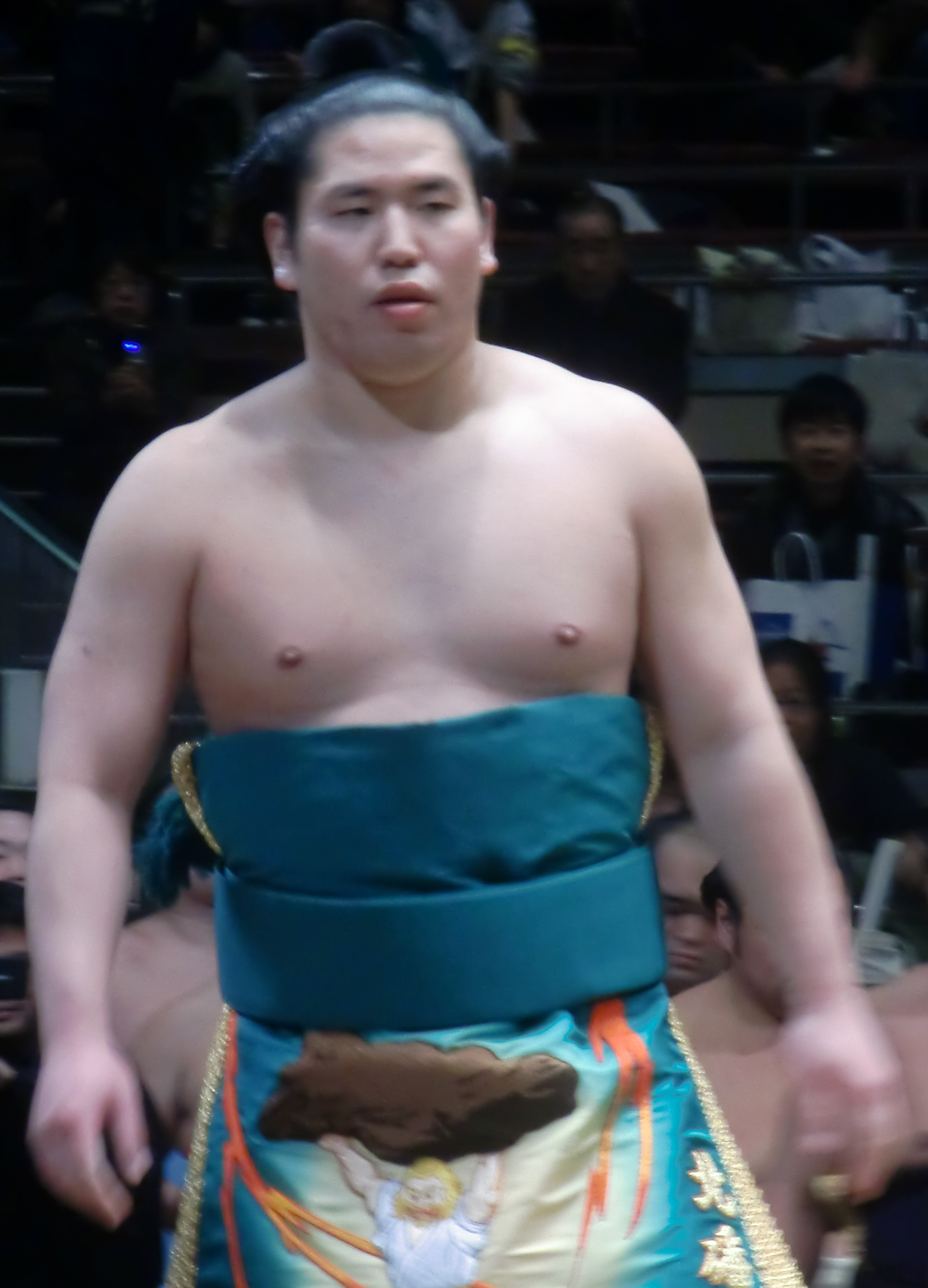
Kitaharima is the highest ranked wrestler in Yamahibiki stable as of 2018

- Kitaharima (best rank maegashira, born 1986)
- Nionoumi (best rank maegashira, born 1986)

== Notable former members ==
- Hakurozan (maegashira 2, born 1982)
- Kitataiki (maegashira 2, born 1982)
- Kitazakura (maegashira 9, born 1971)
- Kiyoseumi (maegashira 13, born 1984)
- Ōrora (makushita 43, born 1983)
- Rikinoumi (sandanme 51, pro wrestler Don Fujii, born 1970)

== Referees ==
- Kimura Kankurō (jūryō gyōji, real name Yoshimi Nakamura, born 1977)

== Ushers ==
- Tasuke (jūryō yobidashi, real name Taisuke Kominami, born 1979)
- Sōichi (jūryō yobidashi, real name Sōichi Takahashi, born 1981)
- Hiromasa (sandanme yobidashi, real name Hiromasa Nakamura, born 1997)

== Location and access ==
Tokyo, Kōtō ward, Kiyosumi 2-10-11
3 minute walk from Kiyosumi-shirakawa Station on the Hanzōmon Line and Ōedo Line

== See also ==
- List of sumo stables
- List of active sumo wrestlers
- List of past sumo wrestlers
- Glossary of sumo terms
