= 2013 in sumo =

The following are the events in professional sumo during 2013.

== Tournaments ==
=== Hatsu basho ===
Ryōgoku Kokugikan, Tokyo, 13 January – 27 January

2013 Hatsu basho results - Makuuchi Division
W		L		A	East			Rank	West		W		L		A
12	-	3	-	0		(Mongolia)	**Hakuhō**	Y	(Mongolia)	**Harumafuji**	15	-	0	-	0
10	-	5	-	0		(Japan)	**Kisenosato**	O	(Mongolia)	**Kakuryū**	8	-	7	-	0
10	-	5	-	0		(Bulgaria)	**Kotoōshū**	O	(Japan)	**Kotoshōgiku**	8	-	7	-	0
8	-	7	-	0		(Japan)	**Gōeidō**	S	(Estonia)	**Baruto**	8	-	7	-	0
8	-	7	-	0		(Japan)	**Tochiōzan**	K	(Japan)	Shōhōzan	4	-	11	-	0
9	-	6	-	0		(Japan)	**Aminishiki**	M1	(Japan)	Myōgiryū	7	-	8	-	0
6	-	9	-	0		(Japan)	Toyonoshima	M2	(Mongolia)	Kyokutenhō	4	-	11	-	0
5	-	10	-	0		(Japan)	Toyohibiki	M3	(Brazil)	Kaisei	6	-	9	-	0
6	-	9	-	0		(Georgia (country))	Gagamaru	M4	(Russia)	Aran	7	-	8	-	0
0	-	0	-	15	ø	(Japan)	Hōmashō	M5	(Japan)	**Ikioi**	8	-	7	-	0
9	-	6	-	0		(Georgia (country))	**Tochinoshin**	M6	(Bulgaria)	Aoiyama	7	-	8	-	0
12	-	3	-	0		(Japan)	**Takayasu**	M7	(Japan)	Masunoyama	4	-	11	-	0
7	-	8	-	0		(Japan)	Yoshikaze	M8	(Japan)	**Chiyotairyū**	10	-	5	-	0
10	-	5	-	0		(Mongolia)	**Tokitenkū**	M9	(Japan)	Takekaze	6	-	9	-	0
8	-	7	-	0		(Japan)	**Kitataiki**	M10	(Japan)	**Okinoumi**	8	-	7	-	0
4	-	11	-	0		(Japan)	Wakanosato	M11	(Japan)	**Fujiazuma**	8	-	7	-	0
7	-	8	-	0		(Japan)	Sadanofuji	M12	(Mongolia)	**Tamawashi**	8	-	7	-	0
6	-	9	-	0		(Japan)	Daidō	M13	(Japan)	Asahishō	4	-	11	-	0
8	-	7	-	0		(Mongolia)	**Shōtenrō**	M14	(Japan)	**Takarafuji**	9	-	6	-	0
8	-	7	-	0		(Japan)	**Tochinowaka**	M15	(Japan)	Kotoyūki	6	-	9	-	0
3	-	12	-	0		(Japan)	Miyabiyama	M16	(Japan)	Tamaasuka	4	-	11	-	0

ø - Indicates a pull-out or absent rank
**winning record in bold**
**Yusho Winner**

=== Haru basho ===
Osaka Prefectural Gymnasium, Osaka, 10 March – 24 March

2013 Haru basho results - Makuuchi Division
W		L		A	East			Rank	West			W		L		A
9	-	6	-	0		(Mongolia)	**Harumafuji**	Y		(Mongolia)	**Hakuhō**	15	-	0	-	0
10	-	5	-	0		(Japan)	**Kisenosato**	O	ø	(Bulgaria)	Kotoōshū	1	-	5	-	9
8	-	7	-	0		(Mongolia)	**Kakuryū**	O		(Japan)	**Kotoshōgiku**	8	-	7	-	0
10	-	5	-	0		(Japan)	**Gōeidō**	S		(Estonia)	**Baruto**	9	-	6	-	0
10	-	5	-	0		(Japan)	**Tochiōzan**	K		(Japan)	Aminishiki	7	-	8	-	0
5	-	10	-	0		(Japan)	Takayasu	M1		(Georgia (country))	Tochinoshin	7	-	8	-	0
3	-	4	-	8	ø	(Japan)	Chiyotairyū	M2		(Japan)	**Myōgiryū**	8	-	7	-	0
5	-	10	-	0		(Mongolia)	Tokitenkū	M3		(Japan)	Ikioi	4	-	11	-	0
7	-	8	-	0		(Japan)	Toyonoshima	M4		(Japan)	Shōhōzan	7	-	8	-	0
8	-	7	-	0		(Russia)	**Aran**	M5		(Brazil)	Kaisei	3	-	12	-	0
5	-	10	-	0		(Georgia (country))	Gagamaru	M6		(Japan)	**Kitataiki**	10	-	5	-	0
11	-	4	-	0		(Japan)	**Okinoumi**	M7		(Japan)	Toyohibiki	6	-	9	-	0
9	-	6	-	0		(Bulgaria)	**Aoiyama**	M8		(Mongolia)	Kyokutenhō	7	-	8	-	0
8	-	7	-	0		(Japan)	**Fujiazuma**	M9		(Japan)	**Yoshikaze**	9	-	6	-	0
11	-	4	-	0		(Japan)	**Takarafuji**	M10		(Mongolia)	Tamawashi	4	-	11	-	0
9	-	6	-	0		(Japan)	**Takekaze**	M11		(Japan)	**Jōkōryū**	9	-	6	-	0
8	-	7	-	0		(Mongolia)	**Shōtenrō**	M12		(Japan)	Masunoyama	7	-	8	-	0
0	-	7	-	8	ø	(Japan)	Tochinowaka	M13		(Japan)	**Sadanofuji**	9	-	6	-	0
7	-	8	-	0		(Japan)	Chiyonokuni	M14	ø	(Japan)	Sagatsukasa	2	-	6	-	7
8	-	7	-	0		(Japan)	**Daidō**	M15		(Japan)	Sotairyu	4	-	11	-	0
5	-	10	-	0		(Japan)	Oiwato	M16		(Japan)	**Wakanosato**	9	-	6	-	0

ø - Indicates a pull-out or absent rank
**winning record in bold**
**Yusho Winner**

=== Natsu basho ===
Ryōgoku Kokugikan, Tokyo, 12 May – 26 May

2013 Natsu basho results - Makuuchi Division
W		L		A	East		Rank	West			W		L		A
15	-	0	-	0	(Mongolia)	**Hakuhō**	Y		(Mongolia)	**Harumafuji**	11	-	4	-	0
13	-	2	-	0	(Japan)	**Kisenosato**	O		(Mongolia)	**Kakuryū**	10	-	5	-	0
11	-	4	-	0	(Japan)	**Kotoshōgiku**	O		(Bulgaria)	**Kotoōshū**	8	-	7	-	0
7	-	8	-	0	(Japan)	Gōeidō	S	ø	(Estonia)	Baruto	3	-	5	-	7
6	-	9	-	0	(Japan)	Tochiōzan	K		(Japan)	Okinoumi	4	-	11	-	0
11	-	4	-	0	(Japan)	**Myōgiryū**	M1		(Japan)	Aminishiki	6	-	9	-	0
4	-	11	-	0	(Japan)	Kitataiki	M2		(Georgia (country))	Tochinoshin	2	-	13	-	0
6	-	9	-	0	(Japan)	Takarafuji	M3		(Russia)	Aran	4	-	11	-	0
5	-	10	-	0	(Bulgaria)	Aoiyama	M4		(Japan)	Toyonoshima	7	-	8	-	0
8	-	7	-	0	(Japan)	**Shōhōzan**	M5		(Japan)	**Takayasu**	8	-	7	-	0
7	-	8	-	0	(Japan)	Yoshikaze	M6		(Japan)	**Takekaze**	9	-	6	-	0
8	-	7	-	0	(Japan)	**Fujiazuma**	M7		(Japan)	Jōkōryū	4	-	11	-	0
10	-	5	-	0	(Mongolia)	**Tokitenkū**	M8		(Japan)	Sadanofuji	7	-	8	-	0
9	-	6	-	0	(Mongolia)	**Kyokutenhō**	M9		(Japan)	**Ikioi**	9	-	6	-	0
10	-	5	-	0	(Japan)	**Chiyotairyū**	M10		(Japan)	**Toyohibiki**	8	-	7	-	0
5	-	10	-	0	(Mongolia)	Shōtenrō	M11		(Georgia (country))	**Gagamaru**	11	-	4	-	0
6	-	9	-	0	(Japan)	Wakanosato	M12	ø	(Mongolia)	Kyokushūhō	5	-	5	-	5
8	-	7	-	0	(Japan)	**Daidō**	M13		(Japan)	Masunoyama	7	-	8	-	0
8	-	7	-	0	(Brazil)	**Kaisei**	M14		(Japan)	Chiyoōtori	6	-	9	-	0
9	-	6	-	0	(Japan)	**Chiyonokuni**	M15		(Japan)	Homarefuji	5	-	10	-	0
6	-	9	-	0	(Mongolia)	Azumaryū	M16		(Japan)	Daikiho	3	-	12	-	0

ø - Indicates a pull-out or absent rank
**winning record in bold**
**Yusho Winner**

=== Nagoya basho ===
Aichi Prefectural Gymnasium, Nagoya, 7 July – 21 July

2013 Nagoya basho results - Makuuchi Division
W		L		A	East			Rank	West			W		L		A
13	-	2	-	0		(Mongolia)	**Hakuhō**	Y		(Mongolia)	**Harumafuji**	10	-	5	-	0
11	-	4	-	0		(Japan)	**Kisenosato**	O		(Japan)	**Kotoshōgiku**	9	-	6	-	0
10	-	5	-	0		(Mongolia)	**Kakuryū**	O		(Bulgaria)	**Kotoōshū**	9	-	6	-	0
8	-	7	-	0		(Japan)	**Myōgiryū**	S	ø	(Japan)	**Gōeidō**	8	-	7	-	0
7	-	8	-	0		(Japan)	Shōhōzan	K		(Mongolia)	Tokitenkū	4	-	11	-	0
1	-	9	-	5	ø	(Japan)	Takekaze	M1		(Japan)	**Takayasu**	9	-	6	-	0
10	-	5	-	0		(Japan)	**Tochiōzan**	M2		(Georgia (country))	Gagamaru	3	-	12	-	0
7	-	8	-	0		(Japan)	Chiyotairyū	M3		(Japan)	Aminishiki	6	-	9	-	0
6	-	9	-	0		(Mongolia)	Kyokutenhō	M4		(Japan)	Fujiazuma	5	-	10	-	0
9	-	6	-	0		(Japan)	**Ikioi**	M5		(Japan)	Toyonoshima	6	-	9	-	0
0	-	0	-	15	ø	(Estonia)	Baruto	M6		(Japan)	**Okinoumi**	9	-	6	-	0
9	-	6	-	0		(Japan)	**Takarafuji**	M7		(Japan)	Yoshikaze	7	-	8	-	0
9	-	6	-	0		(Japan)	**Toyohibiki**	M8		(Japan)	**Kitataiki**	8	-	7	-	0
10	-	5	-	0		(Bulgaria)	**Aoiyama**	M9		(Japan)	Sadanofuji	5	-	10	-	0
8	-	7	-	0		(Russia)	**Aran**	M10	ø	(Japan)	Chiyonokuni	2	-	4	-	9
1	-	14	-	0		(Japan)	Daidō	M11	ø	(Georgia (country))	Tochinoshin	3	-	3	-	9
11	-	4	-	0		(Brazil)	**Kaisei**	M12		(Japan)	**Kotoyūki**	8	-	7	-	0
5	-	10	-	0		(Mongolia)	Tamawashi	M13		(Japan)	Jōkōryū	6	-	9	-	0
7	-	8	-	0		(Japan)	Masunoyama	M14		(Japan)	Tamaasuka	6	-	9	-	0
7	-	8	-	0		(Japan)	Wakanosato	M15		(China)	Sōkokurai	6	-	9	-	0
9	-	6	-	0		(Japan)	**Tokushōryū**	M16		(Mongolia)	**Shōtenrō**	9	-	6	-	0

ø - Indicates a pull-out or absent rank
**winning record in bold**
**Yusho Winner**

=== Aki basho ===
Ryōgoku Kokugikan, Tokyo, 15 September – 29 September

2013 Aki basho results - Makuuchi Division
W		L		A	East			Rank	West			W		L		A
14	-	1	-	0		(Mongolia)	**Hakuhō**	Y		(Mongolia)	**Harumafuji**	10	-	5	-	0
11	-	4	-	0		(Japan)	**Kisenosato**	O		(Mongolia)	**Kakuryū**	9	-	6	-	0
10	-	5	-	0		(Japan)	**Kotoshōgiku**	O	ø	(Bulgaria)	Kotoōshū	4	-	3	-	8
6	-	9	-	0		(Japan)	Myōgiryū	S		(Japan)	**Gōeidō**	11	-	4	-	0
8	-	7	-	0		(Japan)	**Tochiōzan**	K		(Japan)	Takayasu	5	-	10	-	0
8	-	7	-	0		(Japan)	**Shōhōzan**	M1		(Japan)	Ikioi	5	-	10	-	0
8	-	7	-	0		(Japan)	**Okinoumi**	M2		(Bulgaria)	Aoiyama	6	-	9	-	0
5	-	10	-	0		(Japan)	Takarafuji	M3		(Japan)	Chiyotairyū	6	-	9	-	0
6	-	9	-	0		(Japan)	Toyohibiki	M4		(Brazil)	Kaisei	7	-	8	-	0
5	-	10	-	0		(Mongolia)	Tokitenkū	M5		(Japan)	**Aminishiki**	9	-	6	-	0
6	-	9	-	0		(Japan)	Kitataiki	M6		(Mongolia)	**Kyokutenhō**	8	-	7	-	0
3	-	12	-	0		(Russia)	Aran	M7		(Japan)	**Toyonoshima**	8	-	7	-	0
6	-	9	-	0		(Japan)	Fujiazuma	M8	ø	(Japan)	Yoshikaze	6	-	5	-	4
6	-	9	-	0		(Georgia (country))	Gagamaru	M9		(Japan)	Kotoyūki	7	-	8	-	0
6	-	9	-	0		(Japan)	Tokushōryū	M10		(Mongolia)	Shōtenrō	5	-	10	-	0
9	-	6	-	0		(Japan)	**Takekaze**	M11		(South Korea)	**Tochinowaka**	9	-	6	-	0
8	-	7	-	0		(Japan)	**Tenkaihō**	M12		(Japan)	**Sadanofuji**	8	-	7	-	0
9	-	5	-	1	ø	(Japan)	**Endō**	M13		(Japan)	**Hōmashō**	10	-	5	-	0
8	-	7	-	0		(Japan)	**Masunoyama**	M14		(Japan)	**Jōkōryū**	8	-	7	-	0
4	-	11	-	0		(Japan)	Wakanosato	M15		(Japan)	Tamaasuka	7	-	8	-	0
5	-	8	-	2		(Japan)	Asahishō	M16		(Mongolia)	**Tamawashi**	9	-	6	-	0

ø - Indicates a pull-out or absent rank
**winning record in bold**
**Yusho Winner**

=== Kyushu basho ===
Fukuoka Kokusai Center, Kyushu, 10 November – 24 November

2013 Kyushu basho results - Makuuchi Division
W		L		A	East			Rank	West			W		L		A
13	-	2	-	0		(Mongolia)	**Hakuhō**	Y		(Mongolia)	**Harumafuji**	14	-	1	-	0
13	-	2	-	0		(Japan)	**Kisenosato**	O	ø	(Japan)	Kotoshōgiku	1	-	2	-	12
9	-	6	-	0		(Mongolia)	**Kakuryū**	O	ø	(Bulgaria)	Kotoōshū	1	-	3	-	11
8	-	7	-	0		(Japan)	**Gōeidō**	S		(Japan)	Tochiōzan	7	-	8	-	0
4	-	11	-	0		(Japan)	Shōhōzan	K		(Japan)	Okinoumi	7	-	8	-	0
8	-	7	-	0		(Japan)	**Myōgiryū**	M1		(Japan)	Aminishiki	6	-	9	-	0
5	-	10	-	0		(Mongolia)	Kyokutenhō	M2		(Japan)	**Toyonoshima**	8	-	7	-	0
3	-	12	-	0		(Japan)	Takayasu	M3		(Japan)	Takekaze	7	-	8	-	0
5	-	10	-	0		(Japan)	Hōmashō	M4		(South Korea)	Tochinowaka	4	-	11	-	0
10	-	5	-	0		(Bulgaria)	**Aoiyama**	M5		(Brazil)	Kaisei	7	-	8	-	0
11	-	4	-	0		(Japan)	**Chiyotairyū**	M6		(Japan)	**Ikioi**	11	-	4	-	0
9	-	6	-	0		(Japan)	**Toyohibiki**	M7		(Japan)	Endō	6	-	9	-	0
8	-	7	-	0		(Japan)	**Takarafuji**	M8		(Japan)	Tenkaihō	2	-	13	-	0
7	-	8	-	0		(Japan)	Sadanofuji	M9		(Japan)	**Kitataiki**	8	-	7	-	0
6	-	9	-	0		(Mongolia)	Tokitenkū	M10	ø	(Japan)	Kotoyūki	4	-	3	-	8
6	-	5	-	4	ø	(Japan)	Masunoyama	M11		(Mongolia)	**Tamawashi**	10	-	5	-	0
3	-	12	-	0		(Japan)	Jōkōryū	M12		(Japan)	**Fujiazuma**	8	-	7	-	0
8	-	7	-	0		(Japan)	**Yoshikaze**	M13		(Georgia (country))	**Gagamaru**	8	-	7	-	0
8	-	7	-	0		(Mongolia)	**Kyokushūhō**	M14		(Japan)	Tokushōryū	7	-	8	-	0
9	-	6	-	0		(Mongolia)	**Shōtenrō**	M15		(Egypt)	Ōsunaarashi	7	-	8	-	0
0	-	0	-	0	ø	(Russia)	Aran	M16		(Japan)	Tamaasuka	4	-	11	-	0

ø - Indicates a pull-out or absent rank
**winning record in bold**
**Yusho Winner**

== News ==
=== January ===
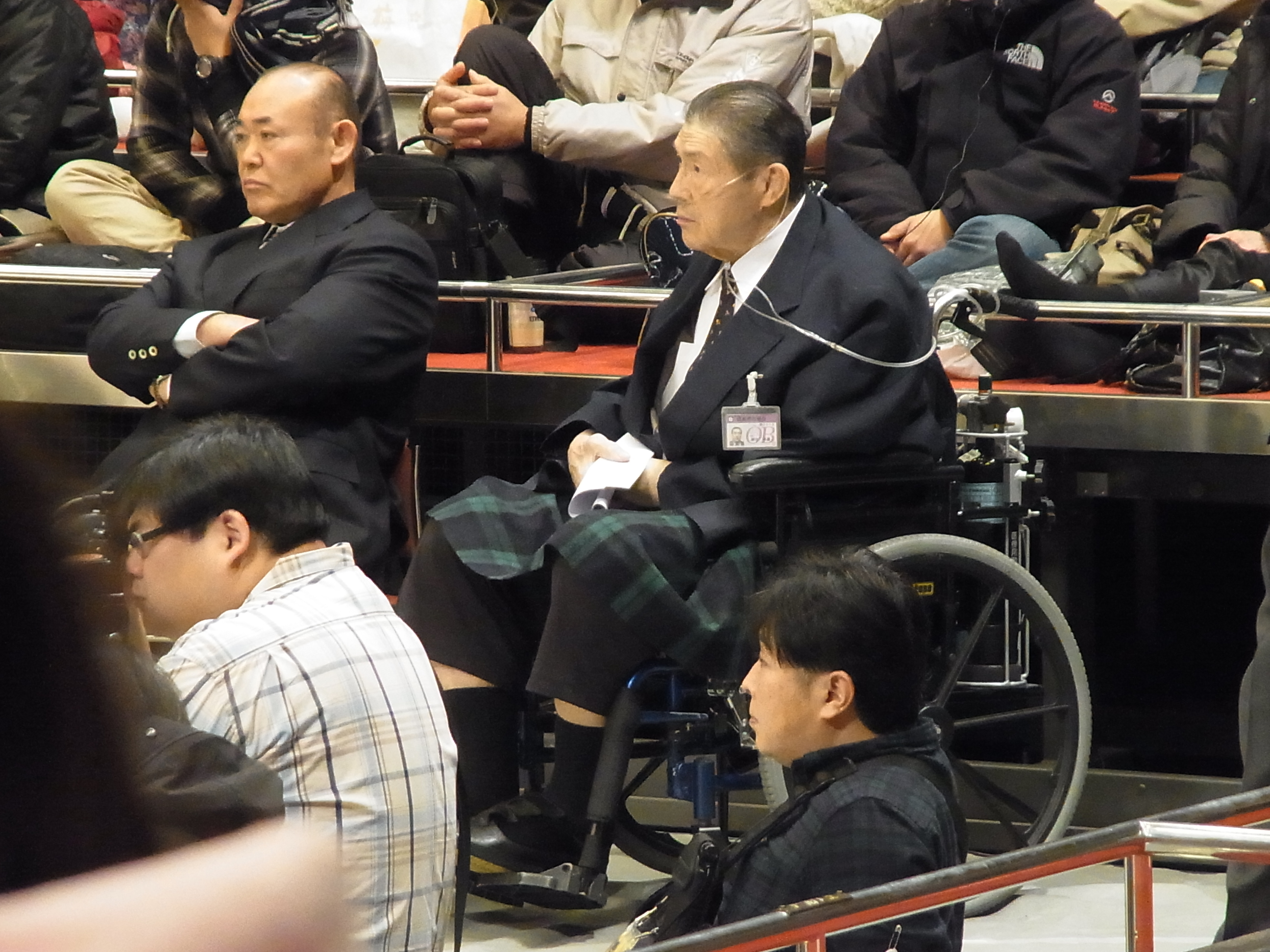
Taihō (pictured here in December 2011) died in January.

- 10: The Nishonoseki stable is reported to close after the Hatsu basho due to the poor health of incumbent stablemaster Nishonoseki (ex-komusubi Kongō). The stable produced the yokozuna Taihō as well as former sekiwake Rikidōzan, who later turned to professional wrestling.
- 19: The 48th yokozuna Taihō, winner of a record 32 tournament championships, dies aged 72. He is generally regarded as the greatest sumo wrestler of the post-war period.
- 27:
  - Yokozuna Harumafuji takes his fifth top division championship with a perfect 15–0 record, defeating fellow yokozuna Hakuhō who finishes on 12–3, having also lost to maegashira Myōgiryū and ōzeki Kotoōshū.
  - Former maegashira Bushūyama and former komusubi Takamisakari announce their retirements. Takamisakari will stay in sumo as a coach at his Azumazeki stable under the name "Furiwake".
- 28: The Japan Sumo Association announces the Nishonoseki stable's closure. Coaches Kitajin and Minatogawa transfer to the Matsugane stable, while coach Fujigane transfers to the Kasugano stable, and Nishonoseki's remaining three wrestlers retire.
- 30: The spring tournament banzuke organization meeting is held. Tochihiryū makes his jūryō debut, while Oniarashi and Senshō return to the same rank from makushita.

=== February ===
- 14: Endō Shōta, an amateur yokozuna from Nihon University, joins the Oitekaze stable.
- 15: Chief Cabinet Secretary Yoshihide Suga announces that Taihō will receive the 21st People's Honour Award. He is the second sumo wrestler to receive the award after Chiyonofuji in 1989.
- 25: The People's Honour Award ceremony for Taihō is held in the Prime Minister's Official Residence.

=== March ===
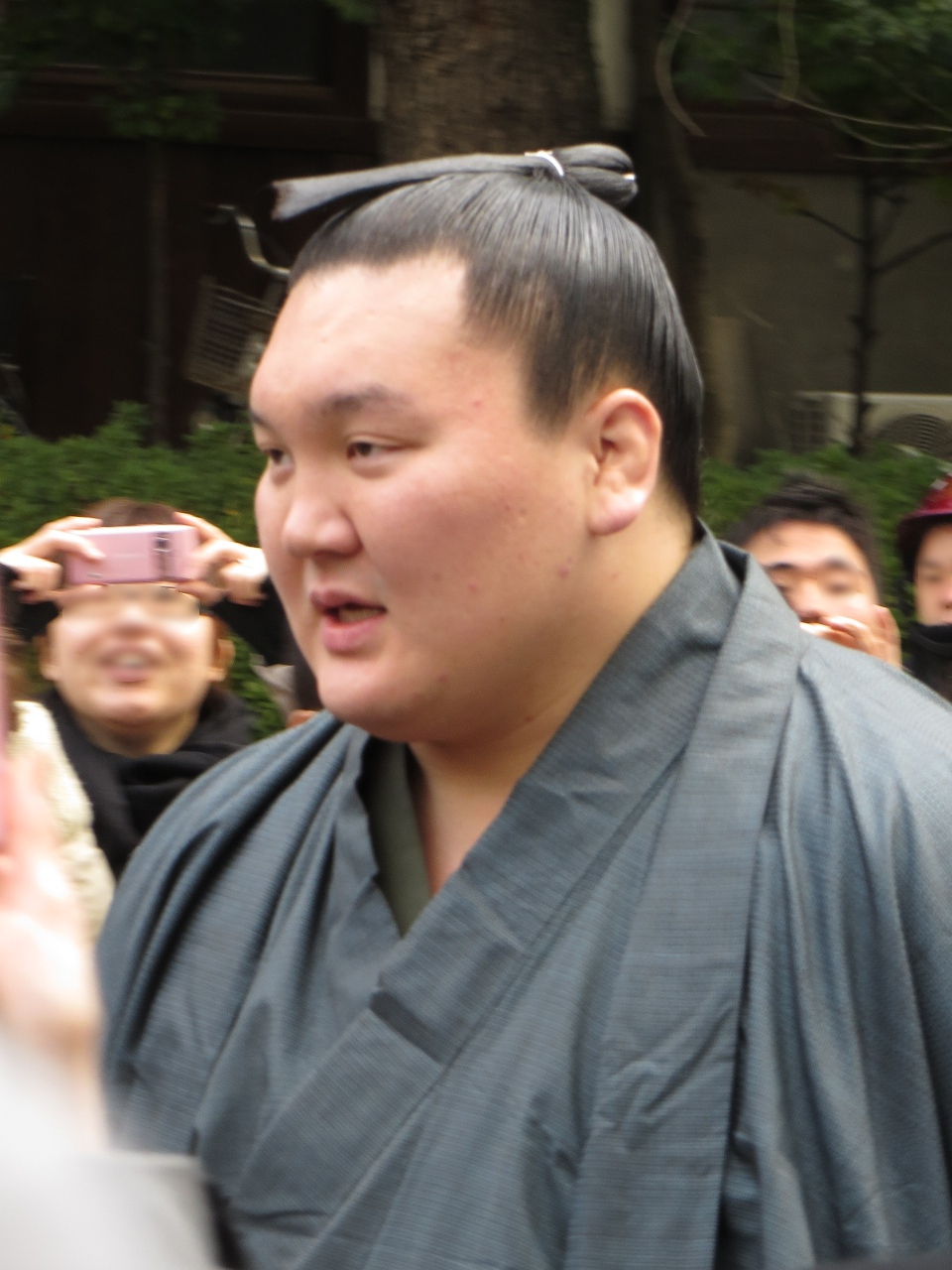
Hakuhō at the Sumiyoshi taisha shortly before the Osaka tournament in March.

- 22: On the 13th day of the spring tournament, yokozuna Hakuhō defeats Gōeidō to earn a 13–0 record, and his championship victory is assured when Okinoumi is defeated. It is the fourth time that he has won a top division championship by the 13th day, a record for the 15-day tournament era that he shares with Chiyonofuji.
- 24:
  - Hakuhō, already determined to be the championship victor, defeats Harumafuji and wins a record ninth perfect victory.
  - Former ōzeki Miyabiyama retires after facing demotion to makushita. He will remain in sumo as a coach at his Fujishima stable, under the name "Futagoyama".
- 25: The Tokyo District Court rules that the former wrestler Sōkokurai was wrongly dismissed in April 2011 over match fixing allegations. Sōkokurai says, “Let me return to the sumo ring.” The Sumo Association is considering whether to appeal the ruling.

=== April ===
- 1: The Japan Sumo Federation transitions into a public juridical foundation.
- 3: The Sumo Association announce that they will accept Sōkokurai's return, and that he will appear on the July banzuke at maegashira #15, his last rank before he was thrown out of sumo.
- 25: The banzuke for the forthcoming May basho is released. Daikihō, Chiyoōtori, Homarefuji and Azumaryū make their makuuchi debut, with Kyokushūhō returning. Okinoumi is promoted to komusubi, becoming the first new san'yaku wrestler from Shimane Prefecture in 121 years.

=== May ===
- 21: On the 10th day of the summer tournament, Hakuhō defeats Gōeidō and sets a record for the highest amount of consecutive double-digit winning records at 38.
- 26: Hakuhō's 25th championship victory is claimed when Kisenosato is defeated by Kotoshōgiku. Hakuhō then defeats Harumafuji and wins his tenth perfect championship.
- 29:
  - The Japan Sumo Association announces the retirement of 14 wrestlers, including former jūryō Kotoyutaka, Masuraumi and Yotsuguruma.
  - A banzuke meeting is held in Nagoya. Seirō, Kotomisen, Endō and Ōsunaarashi make their jūryō debut. Endō reached this division in two tournaments, while Kotomisen reached it in 86, the fourth slowest climb in history. Egyptian Ōsunaarashi is the first African sumo wrestler.

=== June ===
- 8: The Musashigawa stable, which was revived in April, opens.
- 9: Former yokozuna Kitanoumi performs his kanreki dohyō-iri at the Ryōgoku Kokugikan. He is the ninth person to perform the kanreki dohyō-iri, and the fourth to do so while serving as the Japan Sumo Association's chairman.
- 20: The Japan Sumo Association announces the retirement of stablemaster Nishonoseki, who was hospitalized in October 2012 following a stroke, and would have reached the mandatory retirement age in the upcoming November.

=== July ===
- 13: Hakuhō defeats Chiyotairyū on the 7th day of the Nagoya basho, becoming the first wrestler since the Showa era to obtain a consecutive winning streak of 37.
- 19: Hakuhō defeats Kotoōshū on the Nagoya basho's 13th day, and with a winning record of 13–0, Hakuhō's 26th championship victory is assured. This 26th victory is the third highest amount in sumo, and the highest for a foreign-born wrestler. It is also the first time since the introduction of 15-day tournaments that the victors of all divisions were decided on the 13th day.
- 20:
  - Hakuhō loses to Kisenosato on the Nagoya basho's 14th day, ending his winning streak at 43.
  - Former jūryō Mutetsuyama, director of Toyo University's Ushiku High School Sumo Club, dies of heart failure in his home at 42.
- 24: Terunofuji (formerly Wakamishō) and Chiyomaru are promoted to jūryō. Chiyomaru is the brother of Chiyoōtori, becoming the 17th pair of sekitori brothers.

=== August ===
- 4: In the final match of the sumo division in the Inter-High School Championships, Saitama Sakae defeats Tottori Jōhoku with a score of 3–2.
- 24: The first sumo tour outside of Japan in five years is held in Jakarta.

=== September ===
- 2: The banzuke for the autumn tournament is released. Endō makes his makuuchi debut in three tournaments, the fastest climb since the Showa era. Takayasu is promoted to komusubi, becoming the first new san'yaku wrestler to have been born in the Heisei era.
- 11: Former ōzeki Baruto announces his retirement after missing the last two tournaments due to injury.
- 12: The Tokyo District Court dismisses Kotomitsuki's lawsuit against the Sumo Association for wrongful dismissal relating to his involvement in a baseball gambling ring.
- 27: On the 13th day of the autumn tournament, Tenitsu is deemed the victor of the sandanme division. At 35 years and 10 months old, he is the oldest post-war wrestler to win a tournament under the makushita division.
- 28:
  - On the 14th day of the autumn tournament, Hakuhō defeats Kisenosato and claims his 27th championship victory.
  - Former jūryō Toyonokuni announces his retirement.
- 29: Terunofuji claims the jūryō title with a score of 12–3 in his division debut.

=== October ===
- 2: A banzuke meeting is held in Kyūshū. Higonojō makes his jūryō debut, while Kotomisen and Kimurayama return to the rank from makushita.
- 3: The Mihogaseki stable closes due to the mandatory retirement of its stablemaster, former ōzeki Masuiyama II, and its six wrestlers transfer to the Kasugano stable.
- 8: Former sekiwake Aran, who had transferred from the Mihogaseki stable to the Kasugano stable on the 3rd, announces his retirement due to his poor physical condition, and returns to Russia to become a businessman.
- 31: A new discipleship inspection is conducted in Kyūshū, and five people, including Mongolian Altankhuyag Ichinnorov, pass. Ichinnorov, taking on the name Ichinojō, becomes the first foreign wrestler to debut at an elevated rank in the makushita division due to his success in amateur sumo.

=== November ===
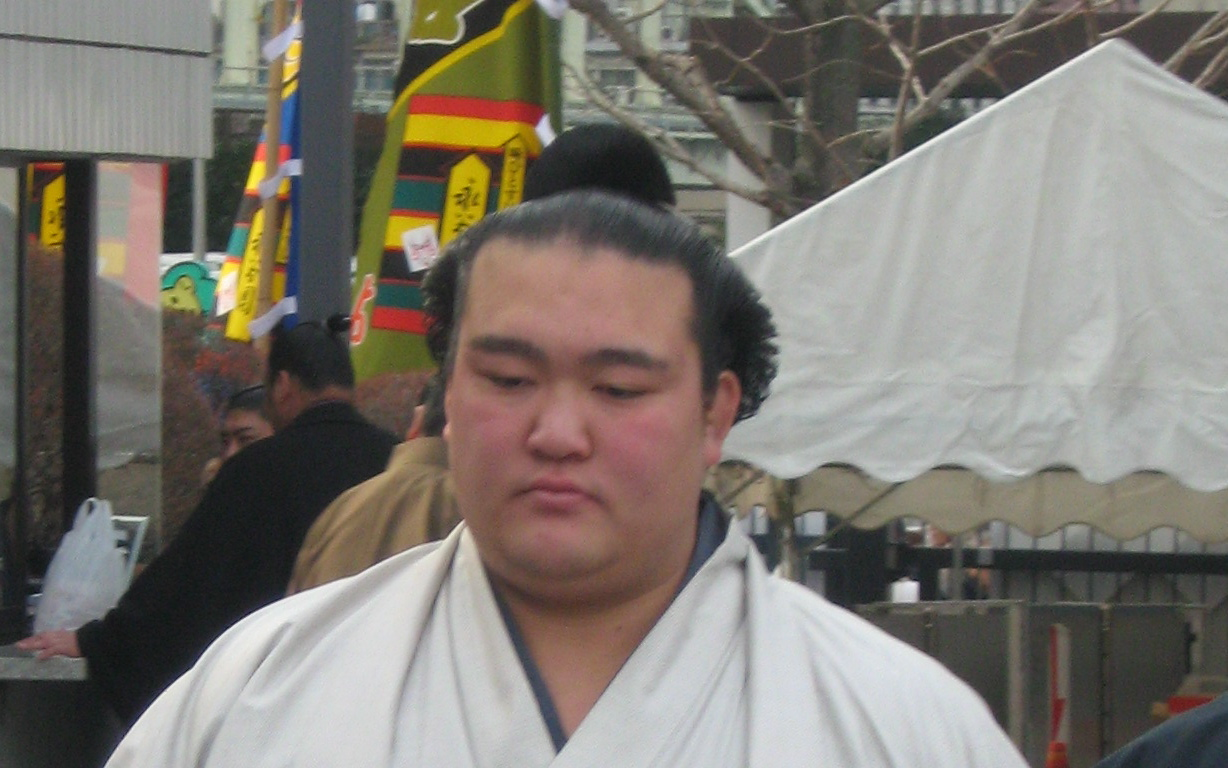
Kisenosato was runner-up for the fourth time in a row in November.

- 2: The National Student Sumo Championship is held. Kohei Ichinose of Nippon Sport Science University defeats Ryota Koyanagi of Tokyo University of Agriculture in the final match.
- 3: A team competition of the National Student Sumo Championship is held, and Toyo University defeats Kindai University with 3 wins and 2 losses in the final match, achieving their third victory in 11 years.
- 8: The concurrent stablemaster of Kasugayama stable, former maegashira Hamanishiki, announces that he will file a proceeding against the preceding stablemaster, former maegashira Kasugafuji, to hand over control of the elder stock.
- 11: On the second day of the Kyūshū tournament, Hakuhō defeats Aminishiki, becoming the fourth wrestler to achieve 500 wins as yokozuna. Within 38 tournaments, he achieved this milestone in the shortest time. He also achieves the most wins for a wrestler in 2013.
- 13: Former yokozuna Takanohana steps in as acting director of the Isegahama stable due to the hospitalization of its stablemaster, former yokozuna Asahifuji.
- 17: On the 8th day of the Kyūshū tournament, Hakuhō defeats Takekaze, achieving 700 total wins in the fastest time.
- 19: On the 10th day of the Kyūshū tournament, Hakuhō defeats Tochinowaka and achieves 38 consecutive double-digit winning records as yokozuna, the highest in history.
- 20: On the 11th day of the Kyūshū tournament, Hakuhō defeats Tochiōzan and achieves 80 wins in a year for the third time in history.
- 24:
  - Harumafuji defeats Hakuhō and wins his sixth makuuchi tournament with a 14–1 record. Hakuhō's consecutive championship-winning streak is ended at four, and his consecutive Kyūshū championship-winning streak is ended at six.
  - The Yokozuna Deliberation Council indicate that Kisenosato will have to capture the title with at least 13 wins in the next basho to earn promotion to sumo's highest rank.
- 27: The banzuke meeting for the New Year tournament is held. Mongolian Sakigake makes his jūryō debut after 62 tournaments, the third slowest climb for a foreign wrestler, and four other wrestlers return to the rank from makushita.

=== December ===
- 19: Magaki stablemaster, former yokozuna Wakanohana Kanji II, retires for health reasons.
- 20: Former maegashira Hōchiyama announces his retirement and adopts the elder name Kimigahama.

== Deaths ==
- 16 January: Former sekiwake Hōō, aged 56, of heart disease.
- 19 January: The 48th yokozuna Taihō, aged 72 (see January entry).
- 24 April: Former maegashira Ōko, aged 56, after a short illness.
- 20 July: Former juryo 11 Mutetsuyama, also known as Kurimoto and an amateur champion at Chuo University, aged 42, of heart failure.
- 25 July: Former makushita 13 Ozora, born Troy Talaimatai from Hawaii, aged 41, of a heart attack.

== See also ==
- Glossary of sumo terms
- List of active sumo wrestlers
- List of years in sumo
- List of yokozuna
