= Tochinoshin Tsuyoshi =

Georgian sumo wrestler (born 1987)

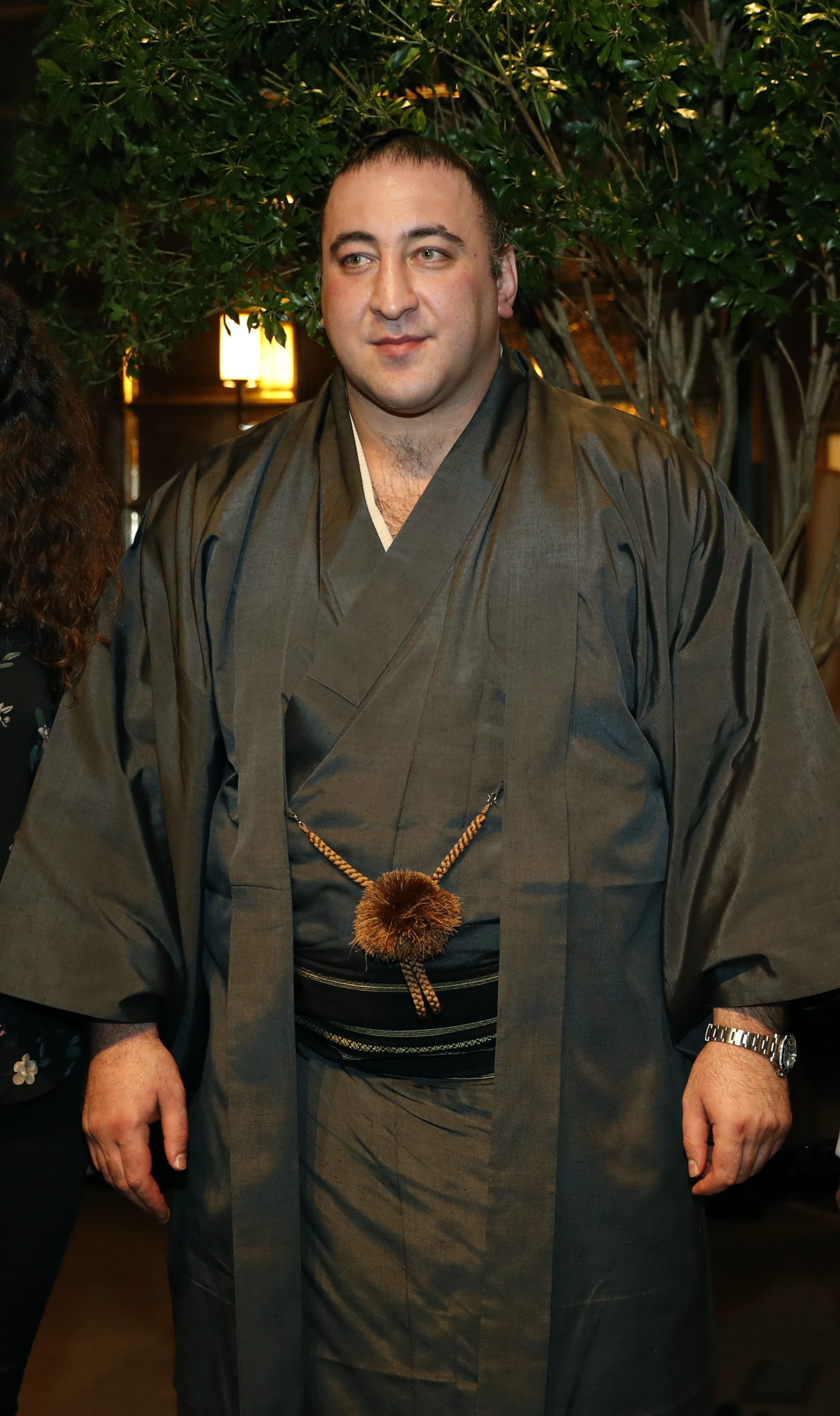
- Tochinoshin in 2019

Personal information
- Native name: 栃ノ心 剛史
- Born: Levan Gorgadze; October 13, 1987 (age 39) Mtskheta, Georgian SSR, Soviet Union
- Height: 1.92 m (6 ft 3 1/2 in)
- Weight: 176 kg (388 lb; 27.7 st)

Sport
- Sport: Sumo
- Retired: 19 May 2023
- Heya: Kasugano
- Record: 681–615–106
- Debut: March 2006
- Highest rank: Ōzeki (July 2018)
- Championships: 1 Makuuchi; 3 Jūryō; 2 Makushita
- Special Prizes: Fighting Spirit (6); Outstanding Performance (2); Technique (3)
- Gold Stars: 2 (Harumafuji, Kisenosato)
- Updated on 19 May 2023

Tochinoshin Tsuyoshi (Japanese: 栃ノ心 剛史; born 13 October 1987 as Levan Gorgadze (Georgian: ლევან გორგაძე; [levan ɡoɾɡadze])) is a former professional sumo wrestler from Mtskheta, Georgia. He made his professional debut in March 2006 and was a member of the Kasugano stable. He reached the top makuuchi division just two years later in May 2008.

After a hiatus due to an injury, in March 2014, he began a comeback from the rank of makushita 55, logging four championships in a row in lower divisions. In January 2018, he won his first and only top-division championship. In May 2018, he was promoted to ōzeki after finishing as runner-up with a 13–2 record and a total of 37 wins in his last three tournaments. He received eleven special prizes, six for Fighting Spirit, three for Technique, and two for Outstanding Performance, as well as two kinboshi for defeating yokozuna.

In 2019, after posting losing records in two tournaments, Tochinoshin was demoted to sekiwake, but returned to ōzeki after winning ten matches at the May 2019 tournament. He lost the ōzeki rank again after the September 2019 tournament, and lost his top division status after he was sidelined with a shoulder injury during the January 2023 tournament. He retired from sumo on 19 May 2023.

== Early life and sumo background ==
As a teenager Tsuyoshi practiced judo and sambo. He competed in amateur sumo at the World Junior Championships in 2004, held in Osaka, Japan and at the World Championships in 2005. He trained at the prestigious Nichidai sumo club at Nihon University where a member of that club encouraged him to become a professional sumo wrestler.

In his early days in Japan he suffered from homesickness and had to deal with his grandmother being killed and his father seriously injured in an accident. Having no knowledge of the Japanese language, he was helped by the wife of his stablemaster who contacted an interpreter from the Georgian embassy, as well as by fellow Georgian Gagamaru from the nearby Kise stable, and by a junior member of his own stable, Munakata, who taught him traditional Japanese greetings.

== Career ==
In 2006 he was recruited by the former sekiwake Tochinowaka of Kasugano stable. The stable had not had a foreigner since the Taiwanese wrestler Tochinohana retired in 1988, but agreed to take on Gorgadze just as his tourist visa was about to expire. After eleven straight kachi-koshi or winning scores he gained sekitori status in January 2008 upon promotion to the jūryō division and immediately took the yūshō or championship in that division with a 12–3 record.

=== Promotion to maegashira ===
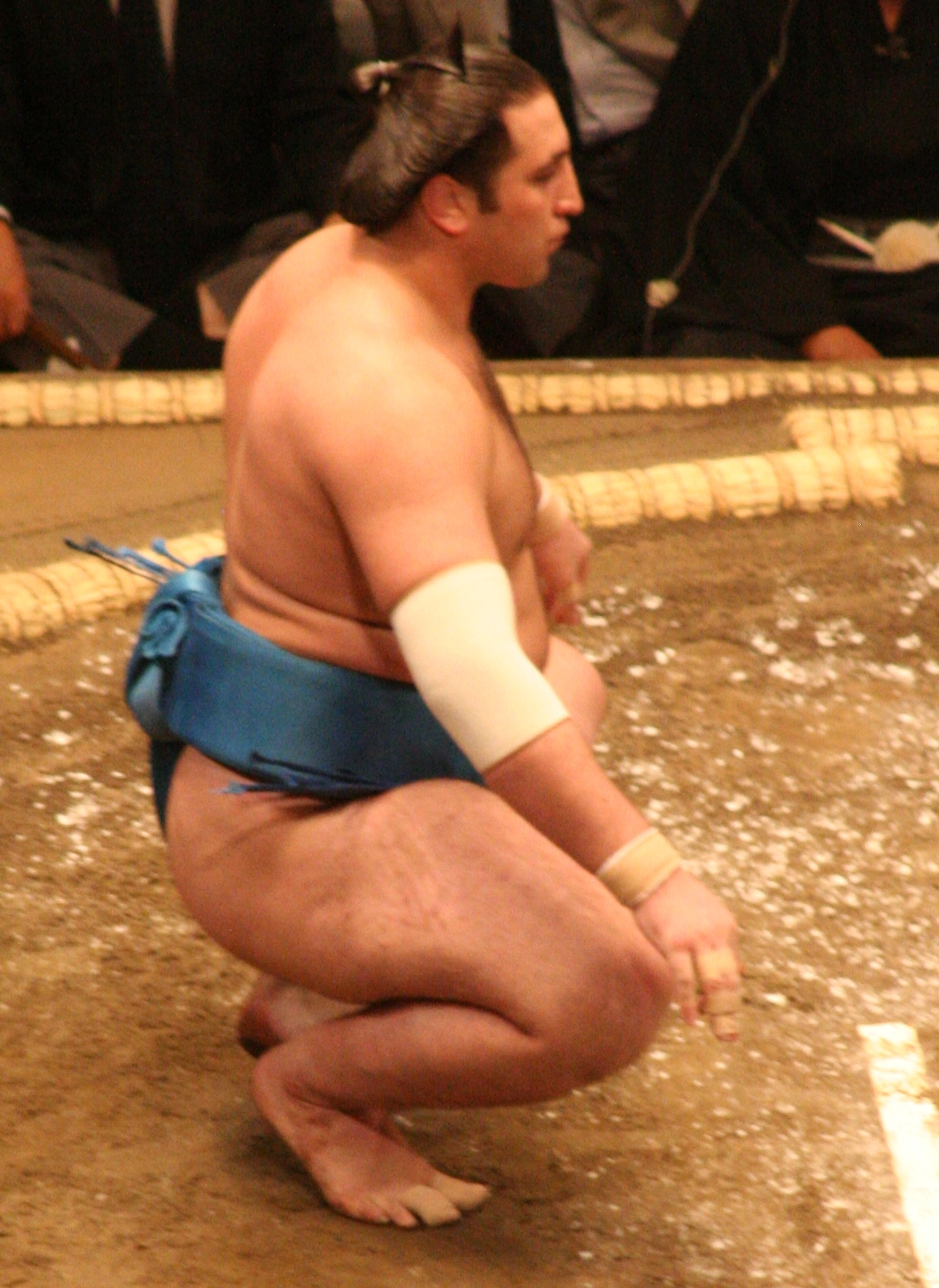
Tochinoshin during the May 2009 tournament.

He took his first ever make-koshi or losing score in his top division debut in May 2008, but still won enough bouts to remain in the division. He reached maegashira 4 in November 2008, but facing the highest ranking men for the first time he could only record three wins against twelve losses. However, in July 2009 he produced a good score of 9–6 at maegashira 5, and was promoted to the rank of maegashira 1 in the September tournament. He could manage only four wins there, but he performed much better in November, finishing runner-up to Hakuhō at 12–3 and winning his first special prize, Fighting Spirit. However, his defeat to Hokutōriki on the final day cost him a chance of making his debut in the titled san'yaku ranks in January 2010.

In the May 2010 tournament he defeated four ōzeki in a row from Days 2 to 5 (becoming only the second man below sekiwake to achieve this, following Masurao in March 1987) and won his second Fighting Spirit prize (shared with Aran). He was rewarded with promotion to komusubi for the first time in the July 2010 tournament. He fell short with a 6–9 record, but returned to komusubi in November.

In May 2011 he equalled his best ever top division performance, once again finishing runner-up to Hakuho on 12–3 and winning another Fighting Spirit prize. This saw him return to the komusubi rank for the July 2011 tournament. His poor performance in November, scoring only 2–13, could be attributed to the fact that he was banned from training before the tournament by his stablemaster as punishment for breaking heya rules on curfew and wearing Western style clothes in public. Tochinoshin was one of three wrestlers at the stable who were beaten with a golf club during this incident, for which his stablemaster was given a warning by the Japan Sumo Association. He made komusubi for the fourth time in September 2012.

=== Falling to makushita ===
Tochinoshin suffered an anterior cruciate ligament injury in the July 2013 tournament, resulting in him missing the next three tournaments and falling from the maegashira ranks to the unsalaried makushita division. In March 2014, fighting from makushita 55, he bounced back with a 7–0 perfect championship. He followed this in the very next tournament in May with a consecutive 7–0 championship in at makushita 6, thereby guaranteeing his re-promotion to the salaried ranks of jūryō. He continued his comeback in fine style by winning two consecutive jūryō championships, the first after a playoff win over Ichinojō and the second with a perfect 15–0 score (only the third time since the six tournaments a year system began in 1958 that the latter had occurred). Returning to the top division in November 2014, he scored 11–4 and picked up his fourth Fighting Spirit Award. In 2015 he won six times in January but in March his eight victories included a win over the yokozuna Harumafuji, earning him his first kinboshi. Winning records in May and July at maegashira 1 saw him promoted to komusubi for the September tournament for the first time in three years. Having fought his way back to san'yaku from makushita 55, Tochinoshin was in first place for the lowest rank fallen before a successful return to the komusubi rank since World War II, but has subsequently lost that distinction to Terunofuji.

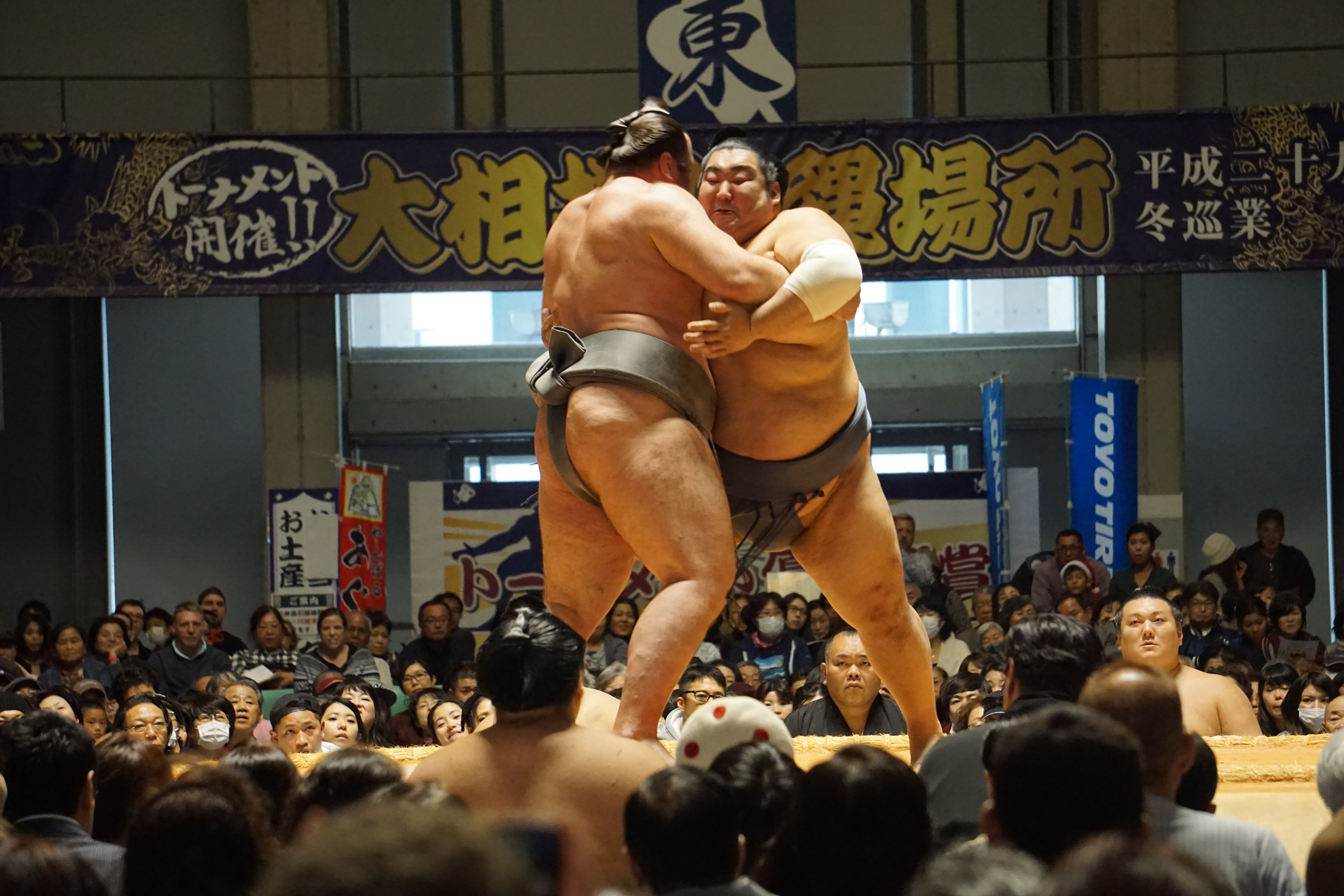
Tochinoshin (left) grappling with Tokushōryū, December 2017

In September 2015 he maintained his rank with a 10–5 record and received his fifth Fighting Spirit prize. He scored only 7–8 in the following November tournament but managed to stay at komusubi, although he fell to the maegashira ranks after a 6–9 in January. In the May 2016 tournament he received his first Technique Prize, and earned promotion to the third highest rank of sekiwake for the first time in the following July tournament. Losing records in July and September saw him drop down the rankings but he returned to komusubi yet again after a 10–5 in November. In January 2017 he lost his first five bouts before withdrawing from the tournament with a knee injury. He had an excellent showing in the July 2017 tournament, which resulted in his being promoted to maegashira 1 for the September tournament, but an aggravation of his knee injury resulted him only achieving four wins against eleven losses in September.

=== Top division championship and promotion to ōzeki ===
In January 2018, fighting at maegashira 3, Tochinoshin won twelve of his first thirteen matches, thereby ensuring that he would, at least, enter a play-off for the championship and that he needed only one win from his last two bouts to secure the championship outright. Before his penultimate match he received a message of support from the Georgian Prime Minister Giorgi Kvirikashvili. On the fourteenth day he claimed his first top division title with a yorikiri win over Shōhōzan, becoming the first man from Georgia to do so. It was the first top division championship for Kasugano stable in 46 years, since Tochiazuma Tomoyori in January 1972. His achievement brought some good news for the stable after it had emerged earlier in the tournament that Kasugano Oyakata was being sued over an assault at the stable in 2014. Tochinoshin, who wrestles in his stablemaster's old mawashi, embraced Kasugano after his victory on Day 14 and later told reporters, "several years ago he told me that he would clutch me to his chest if I won... I was so glad that I made it come true." In February 2018 he was awarded Georgia's Medal of Honour, for the promotion of his country abroad. Tochinoshin returned to the sekiwake rank for the March 2018 tournament for the first time since his single appearance at the rank in September 2016. In the March Tournament in Osaka, Tochinoshin started out slow with a record of 2–2 in the first four days. He would then go on to win his next five matches, before losing the following two against both ōzeki. On Day 12, Tochinoshin won against yokozuna Kakuryū ending his undefeated record. Tochinoshin finished the tournament with a 10–5 record to keep his hopes of being promoted to ōzeki alive. He was also awarded the Outstanding Performance prize for achieving a winning record and having defeated Kakuryū the tournament champion and yokozuna.

Tochinoshin won his first 12 matches in the May tournament, including a win over yokozuna Hakuhō on Day 12 which was his first victory against him in 26 attempts. He eventually finished the tournament 13–2 and runner-up to yokozuna Kakuryū, earning the Fighting Spirit and Technique prizes in the process. Having won 37 bouts over the last 3 tournaments, including 1 yūshō, his promotion to ōzeki was all but certain. The promotion was finalized during an extraordinary meeting of the Sumo Association on May 29, and the following day it was officially announced. He became the eleventh foreign-born wrestler to reach ōzeki, and the 60 tournaments it took him from his debut in the top division ties the record for the slowest ever, alongside Masuiyama II. He is only the second wrestler since the start of the Showa era to fall from makuuchi to makushita and subsequently make ōzeki, after Kotokaze. He was the first wrestler from Kasugano stable to reach ōzeki since the double promotion of Tochinoumi and Tochihikari in May 1962. He returned to Georgia after the announcement for the first time in a year, and met Georgian president Giorgi Margvelashvili. In June 2018 he was awarded the title of Knight seen as the highest honor in the Georgian sports world.

=== Ōzeki career and demotion ===
Tochinoshin won his first five bouts in his ōzeki debut but then injured his right big toe in a defeat to Tamawashi on Day 6 and was forced to withdraw from the tournament. He was kadoban, or in danger of demotion from ōzeki, for the September 2018 tournament, the first time in 18 years (since Miyabiyama in the September 2000 tournament) that a wrestler has been kadoban in only his second ōzeki tournament. In September he still seemed below his best form but saved his ōzeki status with a win over Abi on day 14 and defeated Takayasu in his final match to end on 9–6. Going into the final tournament of the year Tochinoshin was tied with Kakuryū for the most wins in 2018, with 51. With Kakuryū not participating in the tournament, Tochinoshin's 8–7 score in November was enough to give him the record with 59 wins in 2018.

Tochinoshin withdrew from the January 2019 tournament on Day 5 having suffered four straight defeats, due to a thigh injury he picked up in training shortly before the tournament. At the March 2019 tournament Tochinoshin finished with seven wins and eight losses, and was demoted to sekiwake for the May tournament after two losing records in succession.

On Day 13 of the May 2019 tournament, Tochinoshin was initially declared the winner over eventual champion Asanoyama, but the ruling of the gyōji was reversed by the shimpan in what was viewed by some as a controversial decision. Tochinoshin would win the next day without incident to secure his tenth victory of the basho. His ōzeki rank was officially restored for the July 2019 tournament, making him the fifth sumo wrestler since 1969 to be promoted back to ōzeki after just being demoted to sekiwake, and the first since Tochiazuma who accomplished the feat twice in 2004 and 2005. He withdrew from the July tournament on Day 6 having suffered five straight losses, citing knee and shoulder injuries. In September he managed only six wins and was demoted from ōzeki for the second time. He withdrew from the November tournament on Day 5 after fracturing a rib in defeating Takarafuji on the previous day. This ended his hopes of winning ten bouts and making an immediate return to ōzeki, and he dropped to the maegashira ranks for the January 2020 tournament.

Tochinoshin withdrew from the first four days of the November 2021 tournament due to lower back pain. He was facing demotion to jūryō at that point, but managed to return to the tournament and win six matches. In March 2022 he produced his first winning record since November 2020, reaching 8–3 on Day 11 by defeating Terutsuyoshi with a trademark tsuri-dashi or lift out. This ended a run of seven straight losing records.

Tochinoshin withdrew on the fifth day of the January 2023 tournament after dislocating his left shoulder in his Day 4 match against Kotoshōhō. He was subsequently demoted to jūryō for the next basho, ending a streak of 49 tournaments in the top division. He is the seventh former ōzeki to fall to jūryō.

=== Retirement ===
Tochinoshin retired during the May 2023 tournament after losing his first five jūryō contests. At a press conference, he told reporters that he had become fearful of wrestling because his left shoulder injury from January was worsening. "I'm grateful for being able to come to Japan and to be able to be a part of sumo", he said, adding thanks to his stable for nurturing him upon his arrival from Georgia. Although he still helped out at his stable's training sessions, Tochinoshin planned to leave the Sumo Association as he had not acquired Japanese citizenship. In April 2024, he revealed that his master wanted him to remain as oyakata, even for a period of 3 years under his ring name, which his status as a former ōzeki allowed him to do under the condition of acquiring Japanese citizenship. Nevertheless, Tochinoshin did not take the required formalities to acquire the citizenship in time, and his worsened shoulder injury accelerated his decision to retire, denying him the right to work as a coach.

Tochinoshin said in an interview in June 2023 that he would continue to live in Japan to market products from his home country (such as wine or honey) via a company called "Royal Georgia", which he founded with a friend.

Tochinoshin's danpatsu-shiki (retirement ceremony) was held at the Ryōgoku Kokugikan on 4 February 2024. Around 300 people took turns to cut the topknot, with among the most notable guests former yokozuna Asashōryū, Teimuraz Lezhava (Georgian ambassador to Japan) and fellow Georgian-born Gagamaru. The ceremony ended with Kasugano (former sekiwake Tochinowaka) giving the final scissor strokes.

== Family ==
Tochinoshin was married in January 2016 to a childhood friend. His first child, a girl named Anastasia, was born in Georgia in November 2017. His wife and daughter were still in Georgia at the time of his tournament victory in January 2018 and Tochinoshin told reporters that because of his sumo commitments he would not have time to visit them until May.

In March 2018, Japanese media reported he was having an affair with another woman. For that reason, the relation with his wife, who was still living in Georgia, deteriorated, and they divorced in 2018 or 2019. He went back to Georgia in Autumn 2023, but his ex-wife refused to meet with him, and in 2024, he reported he was only able to see his daughter twice.

He then remarried with a Japanese woman named Eimi, one year his elder, and in April 2023, they had a boy whom he named Khareba, after his grandfather.

== Fighting style ==
Tochinoshin favoured yotsu-sumo techniques, preferring to grapple with rather than push his opponents. His stablemaster urged him to concentrate on traditional forward moving sumo, in contrast to other European and Russian sumo wrestlers of the time who specialized in pulling techniques. His favourite grip on the mawashi was migi-yotsu, meaning he liked his right hand inside and his left hand outside his opponent's arms. His most common winning technique or kimarite was yori kiri or force out, but he also used his left hand grip to good effect by regularly employing uwatenage, or overarm throw. He was famous for lifting his opponents into the air, earning him the nickname "sky-crane". He was well known for his strength, and his muscular physique, with his thighs being measured at 90 cm around.

== Career record ==
Tochinoshin Tsuyoshi
Year	January Hatsu basho, Tokyo	March Haru basho, Osaka	May Natsu basho, Tokyo	July Nagoya basho, Nagoya	September Aki basho, Tokyo	November Kyūshū basho, Fukuoka
2006	x	(Maezumō)	East Jonokuchi #17; 5–2	East Jonidan #95; 5–1–1	West Jonidan #49; 7–0–P	West Sandanme #49; 6–1
2007	East Makushita #59; 5–2	West Makushita #41; 5–2	East Makushita #28; 5–2	West Makushita #18; 6–1	East Makushita #6; 5–2	East Makushita #1; 5–2
2008	West Jūryō #12; 12–3; Champion	East Jūryō #4; 9–6	East Maegashira #14; 7–8	West Maegashira #14; 8–7	East Maegashira #10; 8–7	West Maegashira #4; 3–12
2009	West Maegashira #11; 8–7	West Maegashira #10; 6–9	West Maegashira #13; 9–6	West Maegashira #5; 9–6	East Maegashira #1; 4–11	West Maegashira #8; 12–3; F
2010	West Maegashira #1; 5–10	West Maegashira #6; 9–6	West Maegashira #2; 8–7; F	West Komusubi #1; 6–9	West Maegashira #2; 9–6	West Komusubi #1; 6–9
2011	East Maegashira #2; 4–11	West Maegashira #6; Tournament Cancelled; Match fixing investigation 0–0–0	West Maegashira #6; 12–3; F	West Komusubi #1; 6–9	East Maegashira #4; 8–7	East Maegashira #2; 2–13
2012	East Maegashira #9; 10–5	West Maegashira #3; 5–10	East Maegashira #8; 9–6	East Maegashira #4; 9–6	West Komusubi #1; 6–9	East Maegashira #3; 5–10
2013	East Maegashira #6; 9–6	West Maegashira #1; 7–8	West Maegashira #2; 2–13	West Maegashira #11; 3–2–10	West Jūryō #1; Sat out due to injury 0–0–15	West Jūryō #14; Sat out due to injury 0–0–15
2014	West Makushita #15; Sat out due to injury 0–0–7	West Makushita #55; 7–0; Champion	West Makushita #6; 7–0; Champion	East Jūryō #12; 13–2–P; Champion	West Jūryō #5; 15–0; Champion	East Maegashira #8; 11–4; F
2015	West Maegashira #1; 6–9	West Maegashira #4; 8–7 ★	West Maegashira #1; 9–6	East Maegashira #1; 8–7	East Komusubi #1; 10–5; F	East Komusubi #1; 7–8
2016	West Komusubi #1; 6–9	West Maegashira #2; 6–9	West Maegashira #4; 10–5; T	West Sekiwake #1; 6–9	East Maegashira #2; 5–10	West Maegashira #6; 10–5
2017	West Komusubi #1; 0–6–9	East Maegashira #10; 7–8	East Maegashira #10; 12–3	East Maegashira #2; 9–6 ★	East Maegashira #1; 4–11	West Maegashira #6; 9–6
2018	West Maegashira #3; 14–1; OT	West Sekiwake #1; 10–5; O	East Sekiwake #1; 13–2; FT	West Ōzeki #2; 5–2–8	West Ōzeki #2; 9–6	West Ōzeki #2; 8–7
2019	West Ōzeki #2; 0–5–10	East Ōzeki #2; 7–8	West Sekiwake #1; 10–5	West Ōzeki #2; 0–6–9	East Ōzeki #2; 6–9	West Sekiwake #1; 2–3–10
2020	West Maegashira #6; 5–10	West Maegashira #9; 6–9	West Maegashira #11; Tournament Cancelled; State of Emergency; 0–0–0	West Maegashira #11; 10–5	West Maegashira #4; 6–9	East Maegashira #7; 9–6
2021	East Maegashira #4; 4–11	East Maegashira #7; 7–8	East Maegashira #7; 5–10	East Maegashira #12; 7–8	West Maegashira #12; 7–8	West Maegashira #13; 6–6–3
2022	West Maegashira #15; 7–8	West Maegashira #15; 9–6	West Maegashira #9; 8–7	East Maegashira #8; 7–8	East Maegashira #8; 7–8	West Maegashira #8; 6–9
2023	West Maegashira #11; 2–3–10	West Jūryō #2; 5–10	East Jūryō #5; Retired; 0–6	x	x	x
Record given as wins–losses–absences Top division champion Top division runner-up Retired Non-participation Jūryō Lower divisions Sanshō key: F=Fighting spirit; O=Outstanding performance; T=Technique Also shown: ★=Kinboshi; P=Playoff(s); Divisions: Makuuchi — Jūryō — Makushita — Sandanme — Jonidan — Jonokuchi Makuuchi ranks: Yokozuna — Ōzeki — Sekiwake — Komusubi — Maegashira

== See also ==
- List of sumo tournament top division champions
- List of sumo tournament top division runners-up
- List of sumo tournament second division champions
- Glossary of sumo terms
- List of non-Japanese sumo wrestlers
- List of ōzeki
