= Banryūyama Takaharu =

Japanese sumo wrestler (born 1951)

Banryuyama Takaharu
Personal information
- Native name: 播竜山 孝晴
- Born: Takaharu Taguchi; 4 May 1951 (age 75) Tatsuno, Hyōgo, Japan
- Height: 1.77 m (5 ft 9 1/2 in)
- Weight: 145 kg (320 lb)

Sport
- Sport: Sumo
- Retired: November, 1984
- Heya: Mihogaseki
- Record: 579-591-26
- Debut: November, 1966
- Highest rank: Komusubi (November, 1978)
- Elder name: Matsuchiyama
- Championships: 4 (Jūryō); 2 (Makushita)
- Special Prizes: Fighting Spirit (1)
- Updated on Sep. 2012

Banryūyama Takaharu (born Takaharu Taguchi, 4 May 1951) is a former sumo wrestler from Tatsuno, Hyōgo, Japan. He made his professional debut in November 1966, and reached the top division in March 1975. His highest rank was komusubi. He retired in November 1984 and became an elder of the Japan Sumo Association under the name Matsuchiyama. He worked as a coach at Mihogaseki stable until its closure in 2013 and then moved to Kasugano stable. Upon reaching the mandatory retirement age of 65 in May 2016 he was re-hired as a consultant for five more years. He left the Sumo Association upon turning 70 in May 2021.

== Career record ==
Banryūyama Takaharu
Year	January Hatsu basho, Tokyo	March Haru basho, Osaka	May Natsu basho, Tokyo	July Nagoya basho, Nagoya	September Aki basho, Tokyo	November Kyūshū basho, Fukuoka
1966	x	x	x	x	x	(Maezumo)
1967	East Jonokuchi #20; 4–3	West Jonidan #66; 4–3	West Jonidan #77; 4–3	East Jonidan #37; 2–5	West Jonidan #72; 3–4	West Jonidan #83; 5–2
1968	East Jonidan #38; 4–3	East Jonidan #15; 4–3	East Sandanme #91; 4–3	East Sandanme #71; 3–4	East Sandanme #80; 3–4	East Sandanme #84; 5–2
1969	East Sandanme #48; 5–2	East Sandanme #23; 5–2	West Sandanme #1; 3–4	West Sandanme #7; 4–3	West Makushita #56; 4–3	East Makushita #46; 2–5
1970	West Sandanme #3; 5–2	East Makushita #39; 5–2	West Makushita #22; 3–4	East Makushita #27; 5–2	West Makushita #15; 4–3	West Makushita #12; 2–5
1971	West Makushita #25; 4–3	East Makushita #21; 6–1	East Makushita #5; 2–5	East Makushita #16; 2–5	West Makushita #30; 5–2	West Makushita #12; 4–3
1972	East Makushita #10; 3–4	West Makushita #15; Sat out due to injury 0–0–7	West Makushita #45; 4–3	East Makushita #40; 4–3	East Makushita #37; 4–3	East Makushita #34; 7–0; Champion
1973	West Makushita #4; 2–5	West Makushita #16; 5–2	East Makushita #7; 5–2	West Makushita #2; 4–3	East Makushita #2; 3–4	East Makushita #5; 4–3
1974	West Makushita #2; 3–4	West Makushita #5; 5–2	East Makushita #1; 4–3	East Jūryō #13; 9–6	West Jūryō #5; 6–9	East Jūryō #11; 10–5–PP; Champion
1975	East Jūryō #2; 11–4; Champion	East Maegashira #13; 8–7	East Maegashira #10; 8–7	West Maegashira #8; 6–9	East Maegashira #10; 8–7	East Maegashira #7; 6–9
1976	East Maegashira #10; 4–11	East Jūryō #2; 11–4; Champion	West Maegashira #12; 8–7	West Maegashira #9; 7–8	West Maegashira #10; 9–6	East Maegashira #5; 6–9
1977	West Maegashira #8; 8–7	West Maegashira #3; 5–10	East Maegashira #9; 8–7	East Maegashira #6; 5–10	West Maegashira #11; 9–6	West Maegashira #5; 8–7
1978	West Maegashira #4; 4–11	West Maegashira #10; 8–7	East Maegashira #7; 6–9	East Maegashira #10; 9–6	West Maegashira #3; 10–5; F	West Komusubi #1; 2–13
1979	East Maegashira #8; 6–9	East Maegashira #11; 6–9	East Jūryō #1; 8–7	East Maegashira #14; 0–3–12	West Jūryō #10; 8–7	West Jūryō #9; 4–11
1980	West Makushita #3; 4–3	West Makushita #2; 4–3	East Makushita #1; 7–0; Champion	East Jūryō #9; 8–7	West Jūryō #5; 8–7	West Jūryō #3; 9–6
1981	West Maegashira #12; 3–12	West Jūryō #7; 8–7	East Jūryō #3; 8–7	West Maegashira #13; 8–7	West Maegashira #8; 10–5	East Maegashira #2; 3–12
1982	East Maegashira #11; 6–9	West Maegashira #13; 2–13	East Jūryō #8; 6–9	West Jūryō #11; 9–6	East Jūryō #6; 6–9	West Jūryō #10; 13–2; Champion
1983	West Maegashira #14; 4–11	East Jūryō #8; 6–9	East Jūryō #11; 6–9	East Makushita #1; 5–2	East Jūryō #11; 6–9	East Makushita #1; 4–3
1984	East Jūryō #11; 8–7	East Jūryō #7; 6–9	West Jūryō #10; 4–11	East Makushita #5; 3–4	East Makushita #10; 2–5	East Makushita #26; Retired; 0–0–7
Record given as wins–losses–absences Top division champion Top division runner-up Retired Lower divisions Non-participation Sanshō key: F=Fighting spirit; O=Outstanding performance; T=Technique Also shown: ★=Kinboshi; P=Playoff(s); Divisions: Makuuchi — Jūryō — Makushita — Sandanme — Jonidan — Jonokuchi Makuuchi ranks: Yokozuna — Ōzeki — Sekiwake — Komusubi — Maegashira

== See also ==
- Glossary of sumo terms
- List of past sumo wrestlers
- List of sumo elders
- List of komusubi
