= Chiyotairyū Hidemasa =

Japanese sumo wrestler

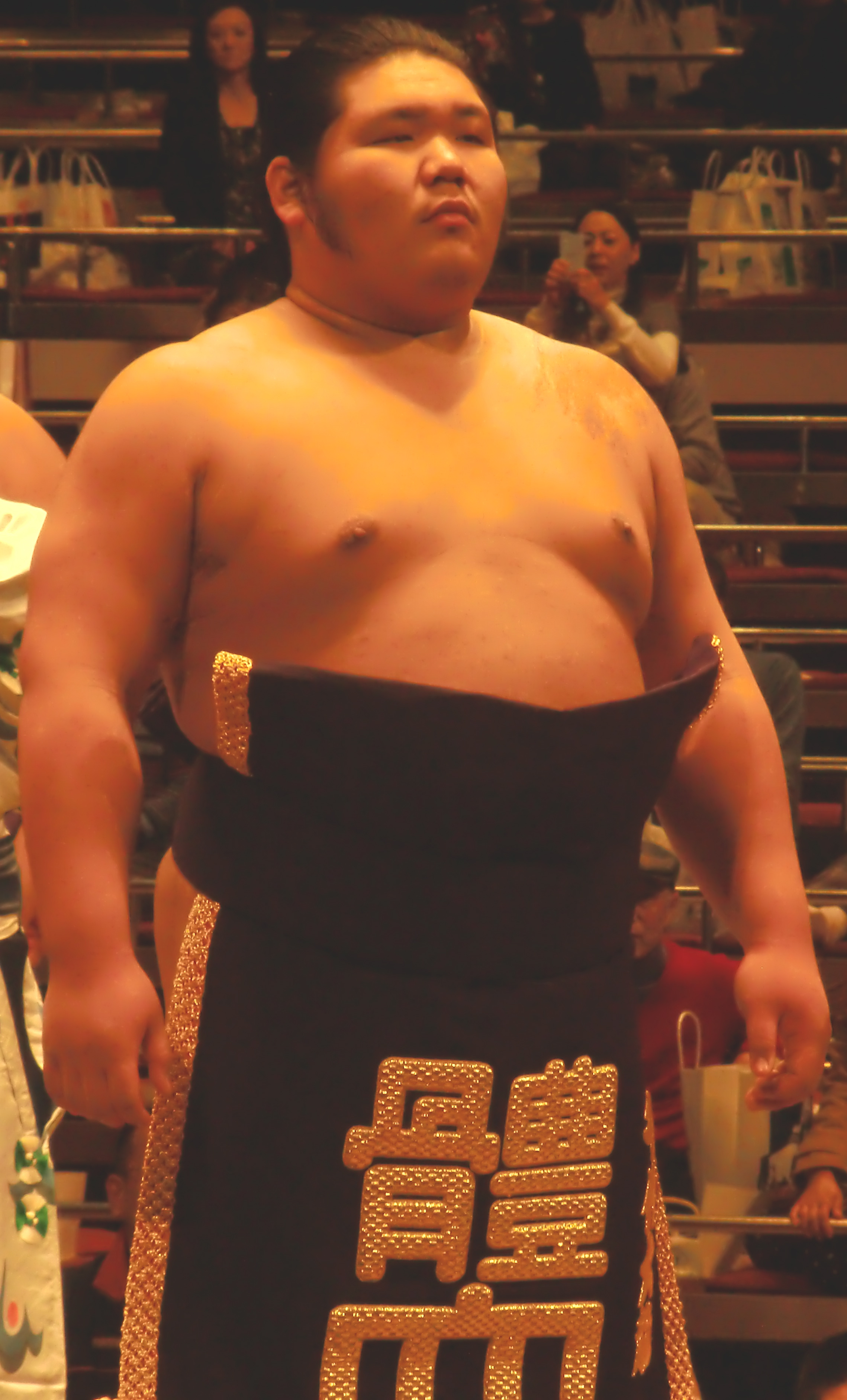
- Chiyotairyū in 2012

Personal information
- Native name: 千代大龍 秀政
- Born: Hidemasa Meigetsuin; 14 November 1988 (age 37) Arakawa-ku, Tokyo, Japan
- Height: 1.81 m (5 ft 11 1/2 in)
- Weight: 185 kg (408 lb; 29.1 st)

Sport
- Sport: Sumo
- University team: Nippon Sport Science University
- Retired: November 20th, 2022
- Heya: Kokonoe
- Record: 463-481-50
- Debut: May, 2011
- Highest rank: Komusubi (Sep, 2014)
- Championships: 1 (Jūryō)
- Special Prizes: 1 (Technique)
- Gold Stars: 3 Harumafuji (2); Kisenosato
- Updated on 20 November 2022

Chiyotairyū Hidemasa (Japanese: 千代大龍 秀政; born 14 November 1988 as Hidemasa Meigetsuin (明月院 秀政, Meigetsuin Hidemasa)) is a Japanese former professional sumo wrestler from Arakawa, Tokyo, Japan. A former amateur champion at university, he made his professional debut in May 2011, as a makushita tsukedashi recruit and reached the top division in May 2012. He earned his first gold star or kinboshi by defeating yokozuna Harumafuji in the March 2013 tournament. His highest rank was komusubi. He earned one special prize, for Technique. He wrestled for Kokonoe stable.

== Early life and sumo background ==
Meigetsuin went to junior high school and high school in Adachi, Tokyo. He attended the martial arts department of Nippon Sport Science University. He became a university yokozuna upon winning the 2010 national college individual sumo championship, and admitted that he got "really big-headed" after this triumph. Meigetsuin was also not a diligent trainer at university, avoiding traditional sumo training exercises and just doing muscular training instead.

== Career ==
Upon graduating, he joined former yokozuna Chiyonofuji's stable on January 24, 2011. However, his tournament debut was delayed because the March tournament was cancelled in the wake of the Sumo match-fixing scandal gripping the world of sumo at the time. During this time, due to the uncertainty about the future of sumo, he considered quitting to become a teacher, but he decided in the end it was better to continue. He participated in the following technical examination tournament in May. Because of his university success he was allowed to make his debut at the rank of makushita 15. He did not fare well in this tournament and after three consecutive losses he withdrew from the tournament due to a right lower thigh inflammation. It was the first time since World War II that a makushita tsukedashi wrestler had withdrawn from his debut tournament, and he was criticized by some commentators for ducking a challenge. He admitted to shedding tears at the comments from his hospital bed. Fighting back from falling to makushita 46 in the following July tournament, he posted two consecutive 6–1 records, and then a 4–3 record in the November 2011 tournament to achieve promotion to the salaried jūryō ranks.

Upon his promotion he chose his new ring name of Chiyotairyū, literally meaning "grand dragon of a thousand years". The name was chosen to honor ōzeki Chiyotaikai, his predecessor at Kokonoe stable and also because his January jūryō debut coincided with the year of the Dragon, considered the most auspicious year in the Chinese zodiac. His rise was so rapid that his hair was still not long enough to fashion into a traditional topknot, or chonmage, that sekitori are required to wear. His success continued as he took the championship in his January 2012 debut with a 13–2 record. A strong showing of 11–4 in the March tournament earned him promotion to the top-tier makuuchi division in May. Though he managed a 5–4 record in the first half of the tournament, he had already aggravated injuries in the previous month's exhibition tournament and was forced to withdraw after the 9th day. The following July tournament he participated in the tournament with his first, still tiny, chon-mage top-knot and achieved a winning 8–7 record.

In August of the same year, Chiyotairyū announced he had been diagnosed with diabetes. In the following September tournament his weight had dropped twenty kilograms from the previous tournament. He only managed a 6–9 record in the tournament. However, with his health and sumo improving he recorded two consecutive 10–5 records in the two following tournaments. In the March 2013 tournament he would debut at his career best rank of maegashira 2. Early on in the tournament he defeated two ōzeki (Kotoshōgiku and Kotoōshū) two days in a row, followed by a kinboshi defeat of yokozuna Harumafuji on the fourth day. His impressive debut came to an early end however, when his leg was broken two days later in a loss to yokozuna Hakuhō, and he was forced to withdraw from the tournament. He made a successful comeback in the next tournament, scoring 10–5.

In July 2013 Chiyotairyū defeated Harumafuji for the second time in two meetings, and in November of that year he scored an impressive 11–4, winning his first special prize, the Ginō-shō or Technique Award. For many tournaments he bounced back and forth between the middle of the maegashira ranks and the top tier, unable to produce a winning record while facing the top competitors but returning at least nine wins when not. His 10–5 record from maegashira 8 in the July 2014 tournament was good enough to get him promoted to komusubi for the first time. His komusubi debut was not a success however, as he withdrew from the tournament on Day 11 having lost nine of his first ten bouts. He also had to withdraw from the January 2015 tournament after suffering complications from diabetes, resulting in the loss of his top division status. He returned to makuuchi in July 2015 and although he had to miss the last four days of the tournament with a foot problem, he had already secured his majority of wins by that point. He was relegated from the top division after scoring only 6–9 at the bottom rank of maegashira 16 in the May 2016 tournament. He returned to makuuchi after two tournaments, but was demoted again after the January 2017 tournament. He returned to the top division with consecutive winning records of 8–7 and 10–5 in May and July 2017. In March 2018 he returned to the komusubi rank for the first time since September 2014. He has remained a rank-and-file maegashira since then. In the September 2018 tournament he defeated yokozuna Kisenosato to earn his third kinboshi. In September 2020 he withdrew from the tournament on Day 13 with a left side inflammation and right ankle problem. He held on to top division status by returning with nine wins in November. In January 2021 he was forced to sit out the tournament along with everyone else from his stable due to a number of positive tests for COVID-19.

== Retirement ==
Chiyotairyū entered the November 2022 basho in Fukuoka at the rank of maegashira 12, having secured just two winning records in his last ten tournaments. After losing five of his first seven matches, he announced his retirement from professional sumo. His stablemaster Kokonoe said that he had lost his motivation to fight since the previous tournament in September, and that "it's not good for him to go to the raised ring with a wish to quit." The day after his retirement, Chiyotairyū said that he felt refreshed and had no regrets. He indicated that he will not remain with the Sumo Association, instead leaving to focus on opening his own restaurant specializing in yakiniku. He opened his first restaurant in the Roppongi district of Tokyo in January 2023. Chiyotairyū announced he would be making his MMA debut on February 18, 2024. On May 24, 2026, he participated in Dogfight Wild Tournament, organized by Jordi Wild, where he defeated professional boxer Jorge Junior Menasalvas, a fight that quickly became viral.

== Fighting style ==
Chiyotairyū relied almost exclusively on pushing and thrusting techniques (tsuki/oshi), showing little interest in fighting on the mawashi or belt. His three most common winning kimarite in his career were oshidashi, hikiotoshi and hatakikomi.

Chiyotairyū had been criticized by even his stablemaster for an overuse of slap-downs and pull-downs at the initial charge, which is considered unfair sumo technique by most. This was especially apparent in his jūryō championship run, where six out of his first eight consecutive wins were won by slap-downs or pull-downs.

== Career record ==
Chiyotairyū Hidemasa
Year	January Hatsu basho, Tokyo	March Haru basho, Osaka	May Natsu basho, Tokyo	July Nagoya basho, Nagoya	September Aki basho, Tokyo	November Kyūshū basho, Fukuoka
2011	x	Makushita tsukedashi #15; Tournament Cancelled; Match fixing investigation 0–0–0	Makushita tsukedashi #15; 0–3–4	East Makushita #46; 6–1	West Makushita #16; 6–1	East Makushita #3; 4–3
2012	West Jūryō #13; 13–2; Champion	East Jūryō #1; 11–4	West Maegashira #10; 5–4–6	West Maegashira #15; 8–7	East Maegashira #12; 6–9	West Maegashira #15; 10–5
2013	West Maegashira #8; 10–5	East Maegashira #2; 3–4–8 ★	East Maegashira #10; 10–5	East Maegashira #3; 7–8 ★	West Maegashira #3; 6–9	East Maegashira #6; 11–4; T
2014	East Maegashira #2; 4–11	West Maegashira #7; 9–6	East Maegashira #2; 4–11	East Maegashira #8; 10–5	West Komusubi #1; 1–10–4	East Maegashira #9; 9–6
2015	West Maegashira #5; 1–6–8	West Jūryō #1; 7–8	West Jūryō #2; 9–6	West Maegashira #13; 8–4–3	East Maegashira #11; 6–9	East Maegashira #13; 8–7
2016	East Maegashira #12; 8–7	West Maegashira #8; 3–12	East Maegashira #16; 6–9	West Jūryō #2; 7–8	West Jūryō #4; 8–7	West Maegashira #14; 7–8
2017	West Maegashira #14; 6–9	West Jūryō #1; 8–7	West Maegashira #14; 9–6	East Maegashira #10; 10–5	West Maegashira #3; 8–7	East Maegashira #2; 7–8
2018	East Maegashira #3; 8–7	West Komusubi #1; 4–11	East Maegashira #4; 6–9	West Maegashira #6; 9–6	West Maegashira #2; 5–10 ★	East Maegashira #5; 7–8
2019	East Maegashira #6; 8–7	East Maegashira #5; 8–7	East Maegashira #3; 6–9	East Maegashira #6; 8–7	East Maegashira #5; 2–13	West Maegashira #11; 9–6
2020	East Maegashira #11; 7–8	East Maegashira #11; 8–7	West Maegashira #8; Tournament Cancelled; State of Emergency; 0–0–0	West Maegashira #8; 6–9	East Maegashira #11; 5–8–2	East Maegashira #15; 9–6
2021	East Maegashira #11; Sat out due to COVID rules 0–0–15	East Maegashira #11; 6–9	West Maegashira #14; 10–5	West Maegashira #4; 4–11	East Maegashira #10; 7–8	East Maegashira #10; 6–9
2022	West Maegashira #12; 7–8	West Maegashira #12; 7–8	East Maegashira #13; 8–7	East Maegashira #10; 6–9	West Maegashira #11; 6–9	West Maegashira #12; Retired; 2–6
Record given as wins–losses–absences Top division champion Top division runner-up Retired Lower divisions Non-participation Sanshō key: F=Fighting spirit; O=Outstanding performance; T=Technique Also shown: ★=Kinboshi; P=Playoff(s); Divisions: Makuuchi — Jūryō — Makushita — Sandanme — Jonidan — Jonokuchi Makuuchi ranks: Yokozuna — Ōzeki — Sekiwake — Komusubi — Maegashira

== See also ==
- List of active goldstar earners
- List of sumo tournament second division champions
- Glossary of sumo terms
- List of active sumo wrestlers
- List of komusubi
- Active special prize winners
