= Dairyūgawa Kazuo =

Japanese sumo wrestler (born 1946)

Personal information
- Native name: 大竜川 一男
- Born: Kazuo Wada; 21 January 1946 (age 80) Kakogawa, Hyōgo, Japan
- Height: 1.78 m (5 ft 10 in)
- Weight: 113 kg (249 lb)

Sport
- Sport: Sumo
- Retired: May, 1979
- Heya: Mihogaseki
- Record: 684-684-0
- Debut: January, 1961
- Highest rank: Maegashira 1 (November, 1969)
- Elder name: Kiyomigata
- Special Prizes: Fighting Spirit (2)
- Updated on June 2020

Dairyūgawa Kazuo (born 21 January 1946 as Kazuo Wada) is a former sumo wrestler from Kakogawa, Hyōgo, Japan. He made his professional debut in January 1961 and reached the top division in September 1968. His highest rank was maegashira 1. Upon retirement from active competition, he became an elder in the Japan Sumo Association, under the name Kiyomigata. He reached the Sumo Association's mandatory retirement age in January 2011.

== Career record ==
Dairyūgawa Kazuo
Year	January Hatsu basho, Tokyo	March Haru basho, Osaka	May Natsu basho, Tokyo	July Nagoya basho, Nagoya	September Aki basho, Tokyo	November Kyūshū basho, Fukuoka
1961	(Maezumo)	East Jonokuchi #20; 3–4	West Jonokuchi #7; 3–4	East Jonokuchi #3; 4–3	East Jonidan #59; 4–3	West Jonidan #13; 3–4
1962	West Jonidan #25; 4–3	West Jonidan #18; 4–3	East Jonidan #2; 4–3	East Sandanme #79; 3–4	West Sandanme #88; 2–5	East Jonidan #6; 3–4
1963	East Jonidan #22; 6–1	West Sandanme #60; 4–3	East Sandanme #44; 5–2	East Sandanme #7; 5–2	East Makushita #74; 4–3	West Makushita #62; 3–4
1964	West Makushita #70; 4–3	West Makushita #63; 5–2	West Makushita #48; 2–5	West Makushita #60; 4–3	West Makushita #51; 5–2	East Makushita #37; 2–5
1965	West Makushita #52; 4–3	West Makushita #44; 4–3	East Makushita #38; 5–2	West Makushita #27; 4–3	East Makushita #26; 4–3	East Makushita #21; 6–1
1966	East Makushita #8; 2–5	East Makushita #19; 6–1	East Makushita #6; 5–2	East Makushita #1; 6–1	West Jūryō #17; 8–7	East Jūryō #12; 7–8
1967	East Jūryō #15; 9–6	West Jūryō #9; 6–9	West Makushita #4; 5–2	West Jūryō #13; 9–6	West Jūryō #9; 8–7	East Jūryō #8; 8–7
1968	East Jūryō #5; 7–8	East Jūryō #6; 7–8	East Jūryō #8; 10–5	West Jūryō #3; 11–4	West Maegashira #9; 7–8	West Maegashira #11; 10–5; F
1969	East Maegashira #5; 7–8	West Maegashira #6; 5–10	West Maegashira #10; 9–6	West Maegashira #4; 4–11	West Maegashira #8; 11–4; F	East Maegashira #1; 3–12
1970	West Maegashira #10; 8–7	West Maegashira #7; 7–8	East Maegashira #9; 3–12	West Jūryō #2; 7–8	West Jūryō #4; 9–6	East Jūryō #3; 6–9
1971	West Jūryō #8; 9–6	East Jūryō #3; 7–8	East Jūryō #6; 7–8	East Jūryō #7; 8–7	East Jūryō #5; 8–7	East Jūryō #2; 10–5
1972	West Maegashira #10; 6–9	West Jūryō #1; 8–7	East Jūryō #1; 10–5	West Maegashira #10; 8–7	East Maegashira #8; 7–8	West Maegashira #10; 8–7
1973	East Maegashira #8; 4–11	West Maegashira #13; 8–7	West Maegashira #10; 8–7	East Maegashira #8; 5–10	West Jūryō #1; 7–8	West Jūryō #3; 10–5
1974	East Maegashira #12; 4–11	East Jūryō #4; 8–7	East Jūryō #2; 4–11	East Jūryō #11; 8–7	East Jūryō #7; 8–7	East Jūryō #4; 9–6
1975	East Jūryō #1; 8–7	East Maegashira #14; 4–11	West Jūryō #5; 9–6	East Maegashira #14; 8–7	East Maegashira #9; 3–12	West Jūryō #6; 8–7
1976	West Jūryō #2; 8–7	West Jūryō #1; 9–6	East Maegashira #13; 8–7	East Maegashira #10; 3–12	East Jūryō #6; 8–7	West Jūryō #2; 6–9
1977	East Jūryō #5; 7–8	West Jūryō #6; 8–7	East Jūryō #5; 7–8	East Jūryō #7; 8–7	West Jūryō #3; 8–7	West Maegashira #12; 4–11
1978	East Jūryō #6; 8–7	East Jūryō #4; 8–7	East Jūryō #3; 7–8	East Jūryō #5; 7–8	West Jūryō #6; 8–7	West Jūryō #5; 6–9
1979	West Jūryō #9; 9–6	East Jūryō #5; 5–10	East Jūryō #12; Retired; 0–5	x	x	x
Record given as wins–losses–absences Top division champion Top division runner-up Retired Lower divisions Non-participation Sanshō key: F=Fighting spirit; O=Outstanding performance; T=Technique Also shown: ★=Kinboshi; P=Playoff(s); Divisions: Makuuchi — Jūryō — Makushita — Sandanme — Jonidan — Jonokuchi Makuuchi ranks: Yokozuna — Ōzeki — Sekiwake — Komusubi — Maegashira

== See also ==
- Glossary of sumo terms
- List of past sumo wrestlers
- List of sumo record holders
