= Hokuten'yū Katsuhiko =

Japanese sumo wrestler (1960–2006)

Personal information
- Native name: 北天佑 勝彦
- Born: Katsuhiko Chiba; August 8, 1960 Hokkaido, Japan
- Died: June 23, 2006 (aged 45)
- Height: 1.83 m (6 ft 0 in)
- Weight: 149 kg (328 lb)

Sport
- Sport: Sumo
- Retired: September, 1990
- Heya: Mihogaseki
- Record: 645–413–47
- Debut: March, 1976
- Highest rank: Ōzeki (July, 1983)
- Elder name: Hatachiyama
- Championships: 2 (Makuuchi); 1 (Makushita)
- Special Prizes: Outstanding Performance (2); Fighting Spirit (4); Technique (1)
- Gold Stars: 3 Wakanohana II (2); Chiyonofuji
- Updated on June 25 2020

Hokuten'yū Katsuhiko (北天佑 勝彦) (August 8, 1960 – June 23, 2006) was a sumo wrestler, from Muroran, Hokkaido, Japan. The highest rank he achieved was ōzeki which he held for seven years from 1983 until 1990. He won two top division yūshō or tournament championships. After his retirement as an active wrestler he worked as a sumo coach until his death in 2006 from cancer.

== Career ==
Hokuten'yū was scouted at the age of nine by former ōzeki Masuiyama Daishiro I of Mihogaseki stable, and given 3,000 yen to ensure his commitment. He made his professional debut in March 1976. He served as a tsukebito or personal attendant to the great yokozuna Kitanoumi, another Hokkaidō native who belonged to the same stable. In his early career he fought under his own surname of Chiba, but in 1978 he was given the shikona of Hokuten'yū, or "heavenly gift from the north", a reference to his birthplace. He was the first wrestler to have a fighting name including the "tenyu" character, which has since been used in a number of other shikona.

He was in the lower ranks for four years, but in May 1980 Hokuten'yū reached the second highest jūryō division and was promoted to the top makuuchi division in November of that year. He made his san'yaku debut in July 1981 at komusubi rank.

At the beginning of 1983 Hokuten'yū was promoted to sekiwake for the first time, and produced a strong 11–4 record. In March 1983 he shared second place with a 12–3 score, and in May he swept the rest of the field aside, losing only to Takanosato and winning his first tournament championship with a superb 14–1 record. After that tournament he was promoted to sumo's second highest rank of ōzeki.

Hokuten'yū had accumulated 37 wins over the course of the previous three tournaments, and it was seen as only a matter of time before he joined his stablemate Kitanoumi at the rank of yokozuna. He had been picked out as a potential yokozuna since he was first discovered and recruited by his stablemaster. He had a perfect physique for sumo, but he suffered from diabetes, and his fighting spirit was also sometimes questioned. His first two tournaments at ōzeki ended with scores of 9–6 and 8–7. He did finish as runner-up in March 1984, and took a second championship in July 1985, but he never made a sustained challenge for yokozuna promotion. After finishing runner-up for the fourth time in November 1985, he was rarely in contention for the title in subsequent tournaments, and he was also restricted by a serious knee injury suffered in a match against Konishiki in March 1987. Nonetheless, he fought as an ōzeki for 44 tournaments, which places him fifth on the all-time list, behind Chiyotaikai, Kaiō, Takanohana I and Kotoōshū.

He had a long rivalry with yokozuna Chiyonofuji, whom he defeated 14 times in competition. There was a personal edge to their matches because of Hokuten'yū's younger brother, who was a low ranking member of Chiyonofuji's Kokonoe stable, but quit sumo after a training incident in 1979 for which Hokuten'yū blamed his rival.

He was particularly popular among female sumo fans.

== Fighting style ==
Hokuten'yū was a yotsu-sumo wrestler, preferring grappling to pushing techniques. His favourite grip on his opponent's mawashi was migi-yotsu, with his left hand outside and right hand inside his opponent's arms. His most common winning kimarite was yori-kiri, the force out. He also specialized in throws. He regularly employed both uwatenage (the overarm throw) and shitatenage (the underarm throw, which he listed as his preferred throw), as well as tsuri-dashi, the lift out.

== Retirement ==
Hokuten'yū withdrew from the September 1990 tournament after suffering four losses in a row and announced his retirement from sumo at the age of 30. He opened up his own training stable, Hatachiyama-beya in 1993. The first sekitori he produced was Hakurozan in 2004. He also served as a judge in tournament matches.

After suffering a stroke in March 2006, he was hospitalised. He died of cancer of the kidney in June 2006 at age 45. This left the stable or heya without a master, and all eleven of his wrestlers transferred to the Kitanoumi stable.

== Career record ==
Hokuten'yū Katsuhiko
Year	January Hatsu basho, Tokyo	March Haru basho, Osaka	May Natsu basho, Tokyo	July Nagoya basho, Nagoya	September Aki basho, Tokyo	November Kyūshū basho, Fukuoka
1976	x	(Maezumō)	West Jonokuchi #6; 5–2	West Jonidan #66; 5–2	East Jonidan #28; 4–3	East Jonidan #12; 5–2
1977	West Sandanme #56; 1–6	East Sandanme #87; 6–1	West Sandanme #35; 5–2	East Sandanme #2; 4–3	East Makushita #49; 2–5	East Sandanme #8; 5–2
1978	East Makushita #47; 5–2	West Makushita #26; 3–4	West Makushita #35; 5–2	West Makushita #20; 5–2	West Makushita #12; 3–4	West Makushita #18; 5–2
1979	West Makushita #9; 2–5	West Makushita #25; 6–1	East Makushita #5; 3–4	West Makushita #9; 2–2–3	East Makushita #29; 5–2	West Makushita #16; 6–1
1980	East Makushita #3; 4–3	East Makushita #2; 7–0; Champion	West Jūryō #11; 10–5–PP	West Jūryō #4; 9–6	West Jūryō #1; 10–5	East Maegashira #11; 8–7
1981	East Maegashira #8; 8–7	East Maegashira #5; 8–7 ★	East Maegashira #2; 9–6; F	West Komusubi #1; 8–7	West Komusubi #1; 8–7	East Komusubi #1; 6–9
1982	East Maegashira #3; Sat out due to injury 0–0–15	West Maegashira #14; 10–5	East Maegashira #7; 8–7	East Maegashira #3; 7–8	East Maegashira #5; 10–5; F★★	West Komusubi #1; 8–7; O
1983	East Sekiwake #1; 11–4; F	West Sekiwake #1; 12–3; F	East Sekiwake #1; 14–1; OT	East Ōzeki #2; 9–6	East Ōzeki #2; 8–7	East Ōzeki #2; 11–4
1984	East Ōzeki #2; 9–6	West Ōzeki #2; 12–3	West Ōzeki #1; 10–5	East Ōzeki #1; 10–5	West Ōzeki #1; 9–6	West Ōzeki #2; 8–7
1985	West Ōzeki #2; 11–4	East Ōzeki #1; 8–7	East Ōzeki #2; 10–5	East Ōzeki #2; 13–2	East Ōzeki #2; 9–6	West Ōzeki #1; 12–3
1986	East Ōzeki #1; 8–7	West Ōzeki #2; 10–5	East Ōzeki #2; 9–6	West Ōzeki #2; 6–9	East Ōzeki #3; 8–7	East Ōzeki #3; 9–6
1987	West Ōzeki #1; 11–4	East Ōzeki #1; 3–6–6	East Ōzeki #3; Sat out due to injury 0–0–15	West Ōzeki #3; 8–7	West Ōzeki #2; 8–7	West Ōzeki #2; 9–6
1988	West Ōzeki #1; 9–6	East Ōzeki #2; 8–7	East Ōzeki #2; 2–5–8	East Ōzeki #2; 9–6	West Ōzeki #1; 8–7	East Ōzeki #2; 10–5
1989	West Ōzeki #1; 10–5	West Ōzeki #1; 12–3	West Ōzeki #1; 10–5	West Ōzeki #1; 9–6	East Ōzeki #1; 10–5	East Ōzeki #1; 5–10
1990	West Ōzeki #2; 10–5	West Ōzeki #1; 9–6	East Ōzeki #2; 8–7	West Ōzeki #2; 9–6	West Ōzeki #1; Retired; 2–5	x
Record given as wins–losses–absences Top division champion Top division runner-up Retired Non-participation Jūryō Lower divisions Sanshō key: F=Fighting spirit; O=Outstanding performance; T=Technique Also shown: ★=Kinboshi; P=Playoff(s); Divisions: Makuuchi — Jūryō — Makushita — Sandanme — Jonidan — Jonokuchi Makuuchi ranks: Yokozuna — Ōzeki — Sekiwake — Komusubi — Maegashira

== See also ==
- Glossary of sumo terms
- List of past sumo wrestlers
- List of sumo tournament top division champions
- List of sumo tournament top division runners-up
- List of ōzeki
