= Jōkōryū Takayuki =

Japanese sumo wrestler

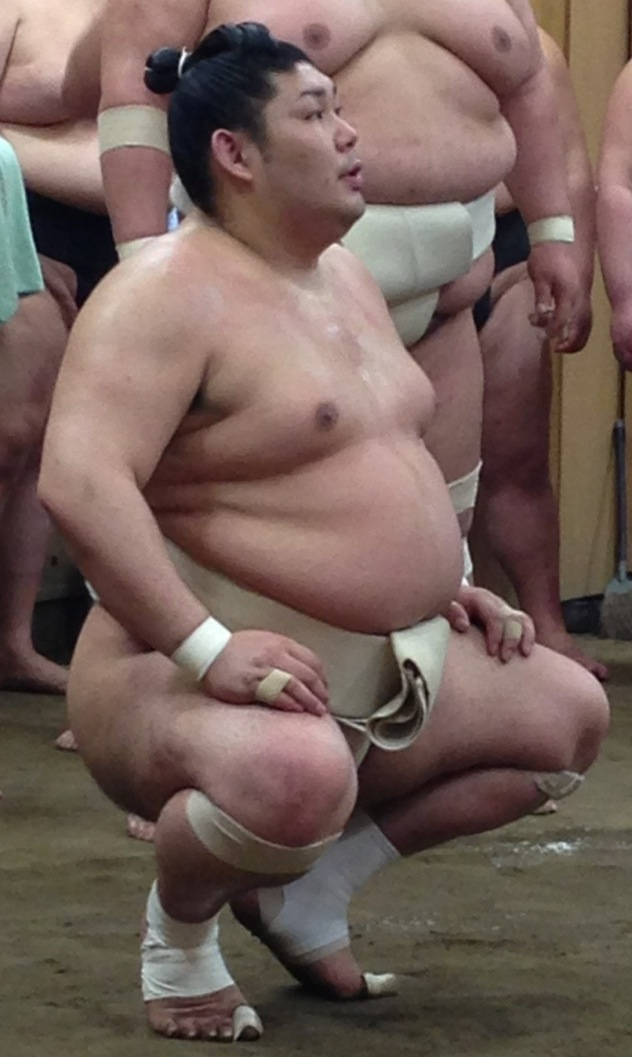
- Jōkōryū in 2013

Personal information
- Native name: 常幸龍 貴之
- Born: Takayuki Sakuma; August 7, 1988 (age 38) Kita-ku, Tokyo, Japan
- Height: 1.87 m (6 ft 1 1/2 in)
- Weight: 165 kg (364 lb; 26.0 st)

Sport
- Sport: Sumo
- University team: Nihon University
- Retired: Sep, 2022
- Heya: Kitanoumi→Kise
- Record: 358-340-27
- Debut: May, 2011
- Highest rank: Komusubi (Sep, 2014)
- Championships: 1 (Jūryō); 1 (Makushita); 2 (Sandanme); 1 (Jonokuchi)
- Gold Stars: 1 (Harumafuji)
- Updated on 23 September, 2022

Jōkōryū Takayuki (Japanese: 常幸龍 貴之; born August 7, 1988 as Takayuki Sakuma (佐久間 貴之)) is a Japanese former professional sumo wrestler. He made his professional debut in 2011 after a successful college career in sumo. He currently holds the record for the most consecutive wins since entering professional sumo, with 27, and for the fastest rise to the top makuuchi division from the lowest jonokuchi division (nine tournaments). His highest was komusubi, which he reached in September 2014. However, because of injuries he fell down the rankings, reaching a low of sandanme 23 in November 2016. He returned to the jūryō division for four tournaments from November 2020 until May 2021, but announced his retirement in September 2022 having fallen to the makushita division.

== Early life and sumo background ==
He participated in amateur sumo while in high school in Saitama prefecture, and in his third year there, won the junior sumo championship in the free weight category. He later entered Nihon University and in his second year, in 2008, he achieved the status of student yokozuna in the national student sumo tournament. This success would have allowed him to enter professional sumo at a higher rank (known as makushita tsukedashi) but he chose to give priority to graduating, and passed up this chance.

== Career ==
=== Early career ===
Upon graduating he joined Kitanoumi stable, adopting the shikona of Sakumayama Takayuki (佐久間山 貴之) to distinguish himself from an active wrestler who already had the surname Sakuma. Before even entering the ring he was making a name for himself because of his diligence, skill, and strength in practice. He was allowed to practice regularly with higher ranked wrestlers almost from the beginning because of this. He won his first tournament championship or yūshō in the jonokuchi division with a perfect record and a playoff win against stablemate and fellow rising star Sasanoyama. In the following September tournament he won all his regular matches, but lost a playoff match for the jonidan championship. Playoffs are not calculated in professional sumo records, therefore his consecutive record was left intact. He continued his streak in the November tournament, with a perfect record and a playoff win. In the first tournament of 2012, he continued undefeated and on the 11th day of the tournament, reached 27 consecutive wins from his entry into sumo, surpassing the previous record set by former komusubi Itai in 1979. In his next match, on the 13th day, he finally lost to an overarm throw, by Sensho. Nevertheless, on the final day of the tournament he came through an eight-way playoff to win the championship. This was his fourth consecutive playoff, a record. His calmness in the ring, and unaffected humbleness about his success at this stage was noted by commentators.

Though he logged two losses for the first time in his first upper makushita tournament in March 2012, his five wins was enough to earn him promotion to jūryō in the following May tournament. The six tournaments it took him to reach sekitori status from maezumo is level with Itai and Tosayutaka for the fastest ever. On the occasion of his promotion, he changed his shikona surname to Jōkōryū. It was also announced that he would be moving to the re–established Kise stable, which was founded by the former Higonoumi but forced to merge with Kitanoumi stable in 2010.

=== Makuuchi career ===
Jōkōryū's first tournament as a sekitori was a success, with him securing his kachi-koshi or majority of wins on the final day with a win over Ōiwato. After a 10–5 score in July, he won promotion to the makuuchi division by clinching the jūryō championship in September with a playoff win over Ikioi. His makuuchi debut in November 2012 was just nine tournaments after his professional debut, beating the previous record of eleven held by Kotoōshū and Aran. He found the going more tough in the top division and recorded his first ever make-koshi, finishing on 6–9 and suffering immediate demotion back to jūryō. However he made a quick return to makuuchi after finishing runner–up in January to Takanoiwa on 11–4. Afterwards he largely alternated between winning and losing tournaments, and fell to jūryō again in January 2013. For the remainder of 2013 he managed to stay in the top division, but was again relegated to the second division in January of the following year, but bounced back in one tournament just as he had in the previous year. In the following two tournaments of March and May 2014 he logged two consecutive winning tournaments in the top division, a feat he could not accomplish in the previous year. In the July 2014 tournament he had his best finish in the top division at 10–5, which earned him promotion to the san'yaku ranks for the first time at komusubi for September. He could manage only four wins in his san'yaku debut and dropped back to the maegashira ranks. In January 2015 he suffered an injury to his right knee in a bout against Endō but continued to fight and picked up his first kinboshi or gold star for the defeat of a yokozuna, upsetting Harumafuji on Day 7. Jōkōryū dedicated the win to his son, as it was his birthday.

==== Injuries and demotions ====
Jōkōryū withdrew on Day 12 of the January 2015 tournament and with only five wins against ten losses in each of his next two tournaments, he was relegated back to jūryō. His 8–7 record in September was his first majority of wins at any tournament in 2015. Although he returned to the top division in January 2016 he was not fully healed and he was forced to withdraw after only two wins because of ligament damage to the same knee that he had injured a year earlier. After two consecutive losing scores in the jūryō division he was demoted to makushita for the July 2016 tournament. After undergoing surgery he was forced to miss both the July and September tournaments, and fell to sandanme 23. He predictably won the division on his comeback in November, going unbeaten in all seven bouts before beating Asahiryū in a play-off. He was promoted to the makushita division for the January 2017 tournament, where he turned in a make-koshi record of 3–4. He returned to jūryō for the September 2018 tournament after an absence of 13 tournaments. He is the first former sanyaku ranked wrestler to make a return to jūryō from the sandanme division. (This feat was matched by Terunofuji and Chiyootori in November 2019.) He was forced to withdraw with a foot injury on Day 14 of the January 2019 tournament, and with only five wins he was demoted back to the makushita division. He returned to jūryō for four tournaments between November 2020 and May 2021, but was demoted to makushita for the July 2021 tournament.

== Retirement from sumo ==
After six consecutive losing records in the makushita division, Jōkōryū announced his retirement after his sixth loss in the September 2022 tournament. Jōkōryū's danpatsu-shiki (retirement ceremony) was held at the Ryōgoku Kokugikan on 23 February 2023. About 160 people took turn to cut the chonmage. A this occasion, he declared he aimed to become a high school teacher through a correspondence course at Nihon University, with the goal to develop amateur sumo in the future.

== Fighting style ==
Jōkōryū's favoured kimarite or techniques were migi yotsu (a left hand outside, right hand inside grip on his opponent's mawashi), yorikiri (force out) and uwatenage (overarm throw).

== Career record ==
Jōkōryū Takayuki
Year	January Hatsu basho, Tokyo	March Haru basho, Osaka	May Natsu basho, Tokyo	July Nagoya basho, Nagoya	September Aki basho, Tokyo	November Kyūshū basho, Fukuoka
2011	x	Tournament Cancelled; Match fixing investigation 0–0–0	(Maezumo)	West Jonokuchi #5; 7–0–P; Champion	West Jonidan #12; 7–0–P	East Sandanme #21; 7–0–P; Champion
2012	East Makushita #15; 6–1–PPP; Champion	East Makushita #4; 5–2	West Jūryō #12; 8–7	West Jūryō #9; 10–5	West Jūryō #3; 11–4–P; Champion	East Maegashira #14; 6–9
2013	East Jūryō #1; 11–4	West Maegashira #11; 9–6	West Maegashira #7; 4–11	West Maegashira #13; 6–9	West Maegashira #14; 8–7	East Maegashira #12; 3–12
2014	East Jūryō #3; 10–5	West Maegashira #13; 8–7	West Maegashira #12; 9–6	West Maegashira #7; 10–5	East Komusubi #1; 4–11	West Maegashira #6; 8–7
2015	West Maegashira #4; 5–7–3 ★	West Maegashira #9; 5–10	East Maegashira #15; 5–10	East Jūryō #3; 7–8	East Jūryō #4; 8–7	East Jūryō #3; 9–6
2016	East Maegashira #14; 2–4–9	West Jūryō #6; 5–10	West Jūryō #11; 4–11	East Makushita #2; Sat out due to injury 0–0–7	East Makushita #43; Sat out due to injury 0–0–7	West Sandanme #23; 7–0–P; Champion
2017	West Makushita #15; 3–4	East Makushita #21; 6–1	East Makushita #8; 5–2	West Makushita #4; 3–4	East Makushita #9; 3–4	East Makushita #14; 5–2
2018	West Makushita #5; 3–4	West Makushita #9; 6–1	West Makushita #2; 3–4	East Makushita #5; 4–3	East Jūryō #14; 8–7	West Jūryō #12; 7–8
2019	West Jūryō #13; 5–9–1	East Makushita #3; 3–4	East Makushita #6; 2–5	West Makushita #17; 2–5	East Makushita #29; 2–5	East Makushita #46; 5–2
2020	East Makushita #32; 6–1	East Makushita #11; 5–2	West Makushita #4; Tournament Cancelled; State of Emergency; 0–0–0	West Makushita #4; 5–2	West Makushita #1; 4–3	West Jūryō #12; 9–6
2021	East Jūryō #9; 5–10	East Jūryō #13; 9–6	East Jūryō #7; 3–12	East Makushita #1; 3–4	East Makushita #4; 4–3	East Makushita #1; 3–4
2022	West Makushita #3; 3–4	East Makushita #7; 2–5	East Makushita #16; 3–4	East Makushita #23; 3–4	West Makushita #33; Retired; 1–6	x
Record given as wins–losses–absences Top division champion Top division runner-up Retired Lower divisions Non-participation Sanshō key: F=Fighting spirit; O=Outstanding performance; T=Technique Also shown: ★=Kinboshi; P=Playoff(s); Divisions: Makuuchi — Jūryō — Makushita — Sandanme — Jonidan — Jonokuchi Makuuchi ranks: Yokozuna — Ōzeki — Sekiwake — Komusubi — Maegashira

== See also ==
- List of sumo record holders
- List of sumo tournament second division champions
- Glossary of sumo terms
- List of komusubi
