= Aran Hakutora =

Russian former sumo wrestler (born 1984)

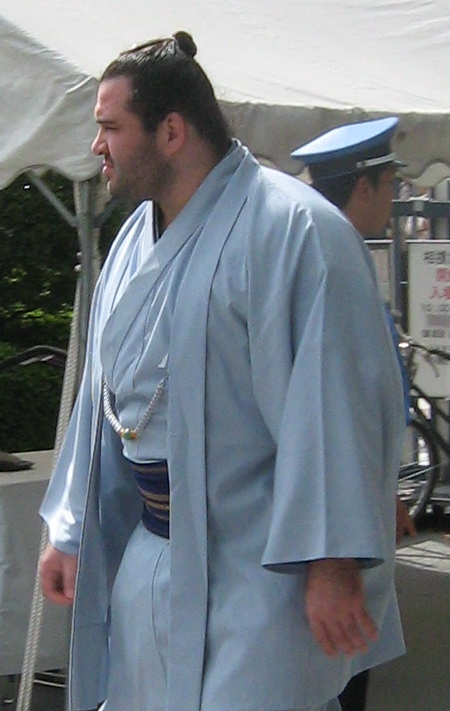

Personal information
- Native name: Japanese: 阿覧欧虎
- Born: Alan Gabaraev; January 31, 1984 (age 42) Vladikavkaz, North Ossetian ASSR, RSFSR, USSR
- Height: 1.87 m (6 ft 1 1/2 in)
- Weight: 141 kg (311 lb; 22.2 st)

Sport
- Sport: Sumo
- Retired: October 2013
- Heya: Mihogaseki
- Record: 263-258
- Debut: January 2007
- Highest rank: Sekiwake (September, 2010)
- Championships: 1 (Jūryō); 1 (Jonokuchi)
- Special Prizes: Fighting Spirit (2)
- Updated on Feb 2, 2015

Aran Hakutora (阿覧欧虎; born January 31, 1984, as Alan Gabaraev, Russian: Ала́н Габара́ев) is a Russian former sumo wrestler. He began his professional career in January 2007 and made the top division in a record eleven tournaments. The highest rank he reached was sekiwake. He was runner-up in the May 2010 and July 2010 tournaments and earned two sanshō, special prizes for Fighting Spirit. He wrestled for Mihogaseki stable.

== Career ==
Aran was born in Vladikavkaz, North Ossetia–Alania, RSFSR, USSR, the same area as Rohō and Hakurozan. He began as an amateur wrestler, winning the Russian National Junior Championships. In October 2006 he won the open division of the World Amateur Sumo Championships held in Saitama, Japan, defeating Ichihara. In December of that year, he joined Mihogaseki stable. Sumo rules allow only one foreigner per stable, and the departure of Baruto to the newly formed Onoe stable created an opening for him.

He made his professional debut in January 2007, alongside Yamamotoyama. Although he was able to win only 2 out of 5 bouts in maezumo, he won the jonokuchi division championship in the next tournament with a perfect 7–0 record, and reached the second highest jūryō division after one and a half years in July 2008. He became the fourth Russian sekitori, after Rohō, Hakurozan, and Wakanohō. (Following the dismissal of these three for cannabis use, Aran was the only Russian left.) He made the top makuuchi division just two tournaments later in November 2008, after winning the jūryō division championship with a 12–3 record. The 11 tournaments it took him to reach makuuchi from his professional debut equalled the all-time record held by Kotoōshū, now broken by Jōkōryū.

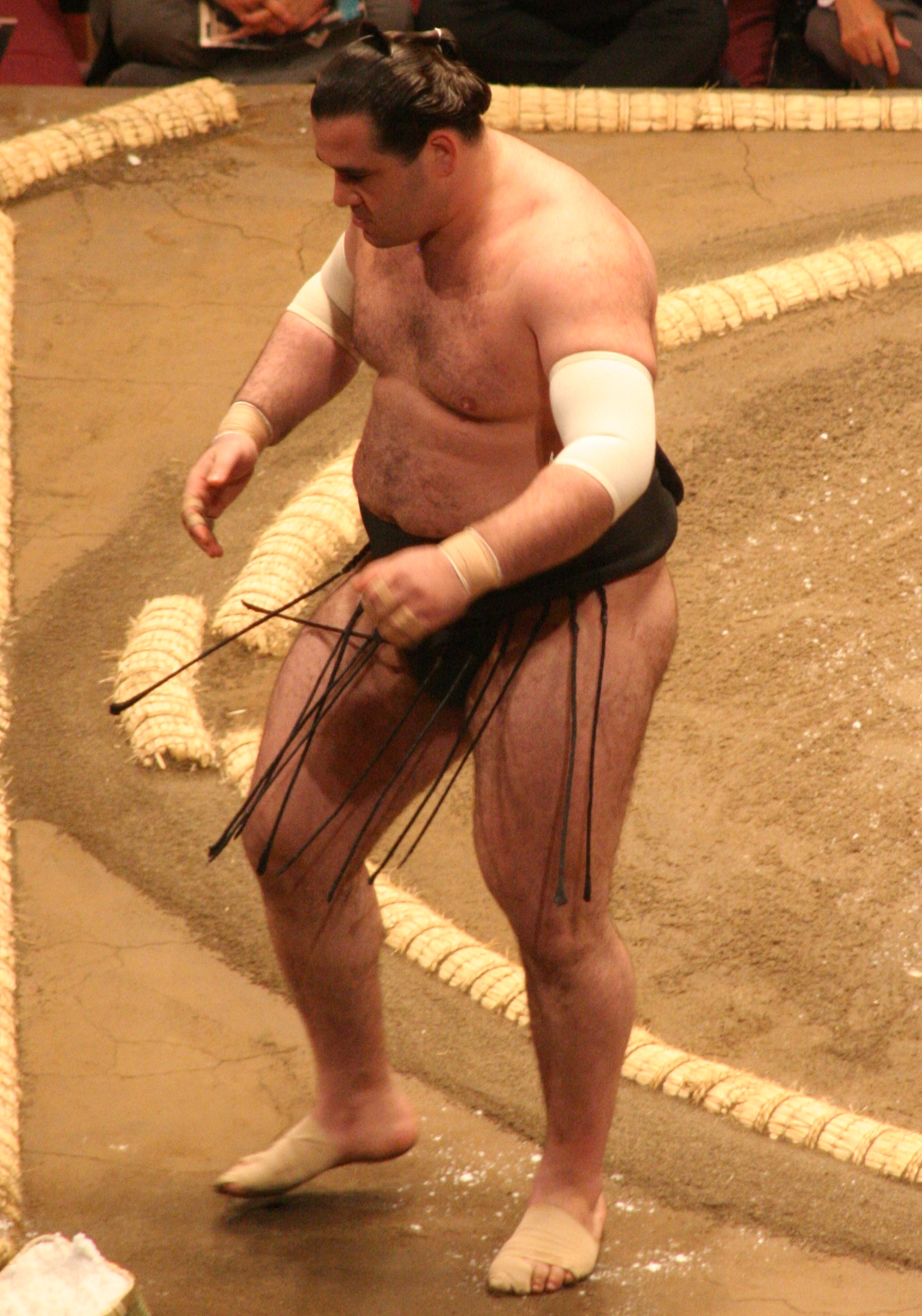
Aran in May 2009.

Until the January 2009 tournament, in which he scored only 5-10, Aran had maintained a winning record in every tournament in which he had participated. However, he responded two consecutive winning tournaments, which sent him up the banzuke to maegashira 1 for the July 2009 tournament in Nagoya. He defeated ōzeki Harumafuji there but was able to win only three other bouts. After three tournaments out of the limelight, he returned to the upper maegashira ranks in the March 2010 tournament, but lost 14 of his 15 matches. However, he put this disastrous performance behind him by scoring 12–3 in May, finishing runner-up to yokozuna Hakuhō and receiving a share of the Fighting Spirit prize, his first sanshō award. He had another good tournament in July, winning eleven bouts from maegashira 2, defeating two ozeki and once again finishing runner-up with a share of the Kantō-shō.

In the September 2010 tournament he made his san'yaku debut at sekiwake, becoming the first member of Mihogaseki stable to reach sumo's third highest rank since the current head coach, the former Masuiyama II, took over in 1984. He fell short with a 7–8 record, his only notable victory coming against the aging ōzeki Kaiō on the final day. He stayed in the san'yaku ranks at komusubi but could score only 4–11 in July. In January 2011 he beat ōzeki Baruto but finished on 5-10, and his 6–9 mark in May, despite a win over Kotoōshū, was his fourth consecutive losing score. He returned to form in July 2011, scoring 10-5 which led to his return to the komusubi rank. However, he had a losing 5–10 record in September 2011 which dropped him to the maegashira ranks for November, and he remained a maegashira throughout 2012.

== Retirement from sumo ==
Though still at a comfortable rank of maegashira 7 in the September 2013 tournament, he chose to retire after posting a 3–12 record where he lost the last nine bouts. His Mihogaseki stable was folding and being absorbed into Kasugano stable, and rather than fight for a new stable, he chose to retire on October 3 of that year. At a press conference he said that his physical condition was bad due to treatment for oral cancer and that he had been thinking about retirement for a year and a half. At his own request he quickly had a private danpatsu-shiki or retirement ceremony for close relatives only, which is unusual for a former sekiwake, and returned to Russia to become a businessman.

== Fighting style ==
Aran's favoured techniques as listed with the Japan Sumo Association were migi-yotsu (a left hand outside, right hand inside grip on his opponent's mawashi), yori (grappling) and oshi (pushing).

He was criticised for not moving forward enough during his bouts and for relying heavily on henka (side-stepping) and slap down techniques. Approximately one third of his wins were by hataki-komi (slap down), a much higher figure than most other wrestlers.

== Personal life ==
In January 2009 he announced his marriage, to a fellow Russian, although the couple had in fact wed in June 2008. They had a son in February 2010.

In January 2010 he revealed that in December 2008 he had undergone treatment for mouth cancer. The operation to remove the malignant tumour was a success, but caused him to drop 20 kilos in weight.

== Career record ==
Aran Hakutora
Year	January Hatsu basho, Tokyo	March Haru basho, Osaka	May Natsu basho, Tokyo	July Nagoya basho, Nagoya	September Aki basho, Tokyo	November Kyūshū basho, Fukuoka
2007	(Maezumo)	East Jonokuchi #33; 7–0; Champion	West Jonidan #26; 6–1	East Sandanme #60; 5–2	East Sandanme #31; 6–1	West Makushita #49; 6–1
2008	East Makushita #21; 6–1	East Makushita #5; 4–3	West Makushita #2; 5–2	East Jūryō #14; 10–5	West Jūryō #6; 12–3; Champion	West Maegashira #10; 8–7
2009	West Maegashira #6; 5–10	West Maegashira #11; 10–5	West Maegashira #4; 8–7	East Maegashira #1; 4–11	East Maegashira #7; 7–8	East Maegashira #8; 7–8
2010	West Maegashira #10; 10–5	West Maegashira #2; 1–14	East Maegashira #10; 12–3; F	East Maegashira #2; 11–4; F	East Sekiwake #1; 7–8	East Komusubi #1; 4–11
2011	East Maegashira #3; 5–10	Tournament Cancelled; 0–0–0	East Maegashira #5; 6–9	West Maegashira #6; 10–5	West Komusubi #1; 5–10	East Maegashira #3; 4–11
2012	East Maegashira #7; 8–7	West Maegashira #4; 9–6	East Maegashira #1; 5–10	East Maegashira #5; 9–6	East Maegashira #2; 3–12	West Maegashira #7; 8–7
2013	West Maegashira #4; 7–8	East Maegashira #5; 8–7	West Maegashira #3; 4–11	East Maegashira #10; 8–7	East Maegashira #7; 3–12	East Maegashira #16; Retired –
Record given as wins–losses–absences Top division champion Top division runner-up Retired Lower divisions Non-participation Sanshō key: F=Fighting spirit; O=Outstanding performance; T=Technique Also shown: ★=Kinboshi; P=Playoff(s); Divisions: Makuuchi — Jūryō — Makushita — Sandanme — Jonidan — Jonokuchi Makuuchi ranks: Yokozuna — Ōzeki — Sekiwake — Komusubi — Maegashira

== See also ==
- List of sumo record holders
- List of sumo tournament top division runners-up
- List of sumo tournament second division champions
- Glossary of sumo terms
- List of non-Japanese sumo wrestlers
- List of past sumo wrestlers
- List of sekiwake
