= Mihogaseki stable =

Defunct sumo stable

Coordinates: 35.6897°N 139.7965°E

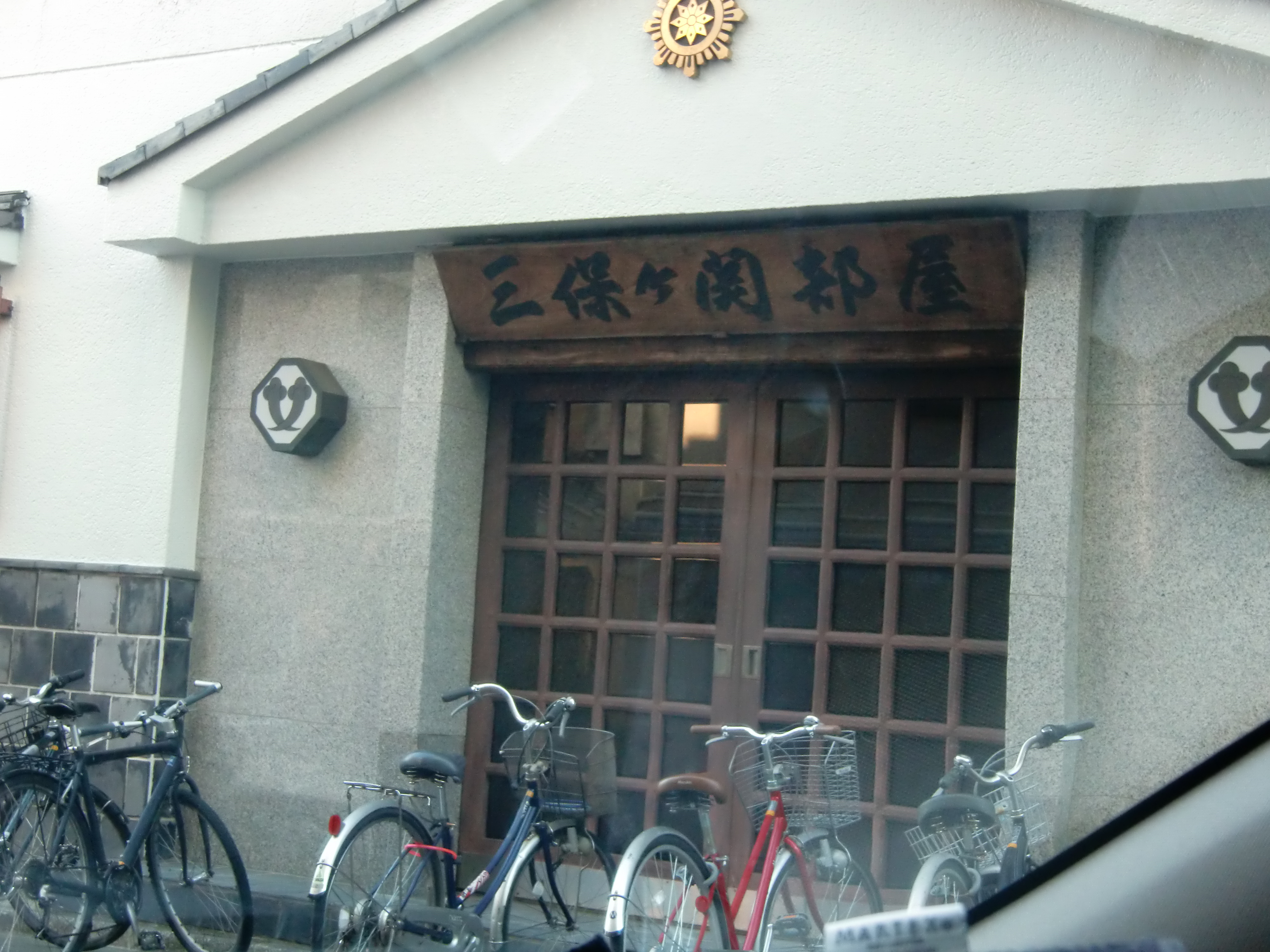

The Mihogaseki stable (三保ヶ関部屋, Mihogaseki-beya) (1950–2013) was a sumo stable of the Dewanoumi group.

Its last head coach, ōzeki Masuiyama Daishirō II who took charge in November 1984, was the son of the previous head, also an ōzeki under the name Masuiyama Daishirō. He produced nine sekitori in that time, the last being the Russian Aran in July 2008. Until September 2006 the stable also had Baruto in the top division, but he later moved to a newly formed stable, Onoe. Being close to the mandatory retirement age, Mihogaseki wound his stable up in October 2013, with himself and his remaining wrestlers moving to Kasugano stable. Aran chose to retire instead.

Former makushita Kaorufuji, the last active wrestler formerly from the stable, retired in January 2026.

== Owners ==
- 1984–2013: 10th Mihogaseki former ōzeki Masuiyama Daishirō II
- 1950–1984: 9th Mihogaseki former ōzeki Masuiyama Daishirō I

== Notable wrestlers ==
- Kitanoumi (55th yokozuna)
- Masuiyama Daishiro II (ōzeki)
- Hokuten'yū (ōzeki)
- Baruto (ōzeki)
- Aran (sekiwake)
- Hamanoshima Keishi (komusubi)

== Coaches ==
- Kiyomigata (maegashira Dairyugawa)
- Matsuchiyama (komusubi Banryūyama)

== Referees ==
- Akijiro Kimura (real name Shigehiro Nakazawa) - jūryō referee

== Usher ==
- Takuro (Takuro Hanazato) - junior chief usher
- Jiro (Kazuo Nishide) - san'yaku usher

== See also ==
- List of sumo stables
- List of sumo elders
- List of active sumo wrestlers
- List of past sumo wrestlers
- List of years in sumo
- Glossary of sumo terms
