= Masuiyama Daishirō I =

Japanese sumo wrestler (1919–1985)

Masuiyama Daishirō
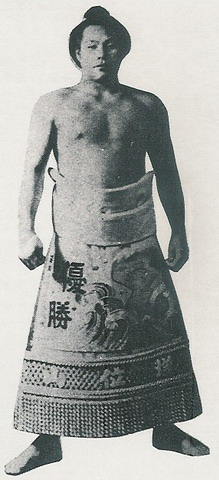

Personal information
- Native name: 増位山 大志郎
- Born: Shinmatsu Sasada; 3 November 1919 Himeji, Hyōgo, Japan
- Died: 21 October 1985 (aged 65)
- Height: 1.75 m (5 ft 9 in)
- Weight: 111 kg (245 lb)

Sport
- Sport: Sumo
- Retired: January, 1950
- Heya: Dewanoumi
- Record: 199-126-23
- Debut: January, 1935
- Highest rank: Ōzeki (January, 1949)
- Elder name: Mihogaseki
- Championships: (2) (Makuuchi) (1) (Jūryō) (1) (Makushita)
- Special Prizes: (1) (Outstanding Performance) (1) (Technique)
- Gold Stars: 2 (1) Haguroyama (1)Maedayama
- Updated on June 2020

Masuiyama Daishirō (3 November 1919 – 21 October 1985) was a sumo wrestler from Himeji, Hyōgo, Japan. His highest rank was ōzeki. After his retirement he was the head coach of Mihogaseki stable and produced yokozuna Kitanoumi among other wrestlers.

== Career ==
Born Kumiaki Sawaka, he joined Dewanoumi stable in 1935 and initially fought under the shikona of Hamanishiki, before changing to Masuiyama in 1937. After winning the makushita tournament championship or yūshō in 1939 he was promoted to jūryō and only two tournaments later, after picking up another championship, he was promoted to the top makuuchi division for the January 1941 tournament. In January 1942 he defeated yokozuna Haguroyama to earn his first gold star or kinboshi. He finished with a losing record but good performances over the next three tournaments took him to komusubi and then sekiwake in 1944. In the first postwar tournament held in a bomb-damaged Kokugikan in June 1945 he could manage only two wins and dropped back to the maegashira ranks, but he was runner-up to Haguroyama in November 1946 with a fine 11–2 record (alongside his stablemate Shionoumi). After earning his first sanshō or special prize for Technique he returned to the san'yaku ranks, and in October 1948 he won his first top division championship. He took advantage of the poor condition of the three yokozuna and finished with a 10–1 record, defeating ōzeki Azumafuji in a playoff. After the tournament Azumafuji was promoted to yokozuna and Masuiyama was elevated to ōzeki. In his second tournament at ōzeki rank Masuiyama took his second and final championship, defeating yokozuna Haguroyama, Azumafuji and Maedayama on three consecutive days to finish 13–2. He defeated maegashira Hajimayama, a fellow member of Dewanoumi stable, in another playoff on the final day.

== Retirement from sumo ==
This was to be the last tourney Masuiyama was to complete. After pulling out of the next two tournaments through injury he retired in January 1950 at the age of 30, having spent only four tournaments at ōzeki rank. He became head coach of the small Mihogaseki stable. After a long period without success, he eventually managed to produce some strong sekitori, including Kitanoumi who reached yokozuna in 1974, and his eldest son, Masuiyama Daishirō II, who was born in 1948, entered his father's stable in 1967 alongside Kitanoumi and reached the ōzeki rank in 1980. In November 1984 Masuiyama reached the mandatory retirement age set by the Japan Sumo Association and passed on control of Mihogaseki stable to his son. He died less than one year later. Kitanoumi, his most successful wrestler, missed his own father's funeral to attend Masuiyama's.

== Top division record ==
- Through most of the 1940s only two tournaments were held a year, and in 1946 only one was held.

Masuiyama Daishirō
-	Spring Haru basho, Tokyo	Summer Natsu basho, Tokyo	Autumn Aki basho, Tokyo
1941	West Maegashira #16; 10–5	East Maegashira #8; 5–10	Not held
1942	West Maegashira #10; 6–9 ★	West Maegashira #12; 10–5	Not held
1943	East Maegashira #7; 8–7	West Maegashira #12; 10–5	Not held
1944	East Komusubi; 11–4	West Sekiwake; 4–6	West Sekiwake; 4–6
1945	Not held	East Maegashira #3; 2–3–2	East Maegashira #8; 5–5
1946	Not held	Not held	East Maegashira #6; 11–2
1947	Not held	Sat out due to injury	West Maegashira #2; 8–3; T★
1948	Not held	East Komusubi; 7–4	West Sekiwake; 10–1–P; O
1949	West Ōzeki; 7–6	West Ōzeki; 13–2–P	East Ōzeki; 3–6–6
1950	West Ōzeki; Retired; 4–6–5	x	x
Record given as wins–losses–absences Top division champion Top division runner-up Retired Lower divisions Non-participation Sanshō key: F=Fighting spirit; O=Outstanding performance; T=Technique Also shown: ★=Kinboshi; P=Playoff(s); Divisions: Makuuchi — Jūryō — Makushita — Sandanme — Jonidan — Jonokuchi Makuuchi ranks: Yokozuna — Ōzeki — Sekiwake — Komusubi — Maegashira

== See also ==
- Glossary of sumo terms
- List of past sumo wrestlers
- List of sumo tournament top division champions
- List of sumo tournament second division champions
- List of ōzeki
