= Masuiyama Daishirō II =

Japanese sumo wrestler and coach (1948–2025)

Personal information
- Native name: 増位山 太志郎
- Born: Noburu Sawada; 16 November 1948 Himeji, Hyōgo, Japan
- Died: 15 June 2025 (aged 76)
- Height: 1.80 m (5 ft 11 in)
- Weight: 109 kg (240 lb)

Sport
- Sport: Sumo
- Retired: March 1981
- Heya: Mihogaseki
- Record: 597-538-15
- Debut: January 1967
- Highest rank: Ōzeki (March 1980)
- Elder name: Mihogaseki
- Championships: 1 (Jūryō)
- Special Prizes: Technique (5)
- Gold Stars: 4 Wajima (3); Kitanofuji
- Updated on June 2020

Masuiyama Daishirō (16 November 1948 – 15 June 2025) was a Japanese sumo wrestler and coach from Hyōgo. In 1980, he became the oldest wrestler to be promoted to the rank of ōzeki in the modern era (since 1958). After retiring from active competition in 1981 he became a sumo coach and an elder of the Japan Sumo Association under the name Mihogaseki and produced several top-division wrestlers as head of Mihogaseki stable. In 2013, he stepping down from the stable at age 65. He was also an enka musician.

== Early life and career ==
Born in Himeji, he was the son of former ōzeki Masuiyama Daishirō I, and the grandson of a komusubi in Osaka sumo, Tamanomori. He was a talented swimmer at school but wanted to follow his father into sumo. Initially turned down because of his size, he eventually persuaded his father to let him join his Mihogaseki stable in January 1967. He began at the same time as Kitanoumi, a future yokozuna. He began fighting under the name Suiryū (his own surname was being used by another wrestler), adopting the Masuiyama shikona the following year. He reached sekitori status in July 1969 upon promotion to the jūryō division and reached the top makuuchi division for the first time in March 1970. Weighing barely 100 kg, and prone to injury, he was not able to establish himself in the division until 1972, temporarily dropping back to jūryō where he won his only yūshō or tournament championship in January of that year. In November 1972, he won the first of his five Ginō-shō or Technique prizes and earned promotion to komusubi. He was demoted after only one tournament and mostly remained in the maegashira ranks for the next few years. In May 1974, he scored 12 wins and was a tournament runner-up behind stablemate Kitanoumi.

In July 1978, he finally earned promotion to the third highest sekiwake rank, but once again was unable to maintain it, dropping back to maegashira level. At the end of 1979, he returned to sekiwake and scored 11 wins. In January 1980, he was again a tournament runner-up, this time to yokozuna Mienoumi, and after the tournament he was promoted to ōzeki. It had taken him 60 tournaments to get there from his top-division debut, a record, and at thirty one years two months he was also the oldest to reach the rank since the introduction of the six-tournaments-a-year system in 1958 (The latter record was broken by Kotomitsuki in July 2007). Masuiyama and Mihogaseki Oyakata became the first father and son ōzeki in sumo history. His ōzeki career was brief, and he announced his retirement during the March 1981 tournament.

== Retirement from sumo ==
Masuiyama remained in the sumo world as an elder initially under the name Onogawa, and in November 1984 he succeeded his father as head coach of Mihogaseki stable, when the latter reached the retirement age of 65. His father died in 1986. He inherited ōzeki Hokuten'yū, and produced four other top-division wrestlers: Higonoumi, Hamanoshima, Baruto and Aran. Known as Mihogaseki Oyakata, he ran the stable until October 2013, when he dissolved the stable and moved his wrestlers to Kasugano stable. He was also once on the board of directors of the Japan Sumo Association. He reached the Sumo Association's mandatory retirement age of 65 in November 2013.

== Fighting style ==
Masuiyama began as a tsuppari specialist and would attack his opponents with a series of rapid thrusts to the chest. Following a left wrist injury, he changed his style and would use his right hand to grab his opponent's mawashi and draw him in. He would use his great reflexes and flexible lower back to win with techniques such as uwatenage (overarm throw), uchimuso (inner thigh twist down), katasukashi (shoulder swing down) and other leg and yotsu-sumo moves. However he lacked the power to consistently beat the top ranked wrestlers.

== Enka musician ==
Masuiyama was also an enka musician. His debut release was "Iroha koiuta" (いろは恋唄) in 1974. His musical career was in parallel with sumo wrestling, with his performances in clubs reportedly earning him 1.5 million yen a night, until the Sumo Association banned such extra-curricular activities. His notable songs include "Sonna Yuko ni horemashita" (そんな夕子にほれました)(1974), "Sonna onna no hitorigoto" (そんな女のひとりごと)(1977) which sold 1.3 million copies, "Otoko no Senaka" (男の背中), "Hisoyakani Hanayakani" (秘そやかに華やかに) (a duet with Naomi Matsui)(2012),"Yuko no Omise" (夕子のお店) (2013), "Fuyuko no blues" (冬子のブルース) (2013) and "A man's cup-sake" (男のコップ酒). In 2013, he retired from the Sumo Association and re-started exclusively as an enka musician. In 2015, he opened a chanko restaurant, Chanko Masuiyama, on the premises of the now-closed Mihogaseki stable.

== Death ==
Masuiyama died of liver failure on 15 June 2025, at the age of 76.

== Career record ==
Masuiyama Daishirō II
Year	January Hatsu basho, Tokyo	March Haru basho, Osaka	May Natsu basho, Tokyo	July Nagoya basho, Nagoya	September Aki basho, Tokyo	November Kyūshū basho, Fukuoka
1967	(Maezumo)	West Jonokuchi #8; 6–1	East Jonidan #81; 4–3	West Jonidan #41; 6–1	East Sandanme #92; 6–1	East Sandanme #49; 4–3
1968	West Sandanme #38; 5–2	West Sandanme #14; 4–3	East Sandanme #4; 5–2	East Makushita #46; 5–2	West Makushita #31; 3–4	West Makushita #36; 5–2
1969	East Makushita #20; 6–1	East Makushita #5; 4–3	West Makushita #2; 6–1	East Jūryō #12; 7–8	West Jūryō #13; 9–6	East Jūryō #10; 9–6
1970	East Jūryō #5; 11–4	West Maegashira #11; 7–8	East Jūryō #1; 9–6	West Maegashira #12; 7–8	East Jūryō #2; 8–7	West Jūryō #2; 7–8
1971	West Jūryō #2; 9–6	West Maegashira #11; 9–6	West Maegashira #7; 9–6	East Maegashira #2; 3–11–1	East Maegashira #11; 1–4–10	East Jūryō #7; 7–8
1972	West Jūryō #8; 12–3; Champion	West Maegashira #13; 6–9	East Jūryō #4; 9–6	East Jūryō #2; 9–6	East Maegashira #13; 10–5	West Maegashira #4; 9–6; T
1973	West Komusubi #1; 5–10	West Maegashira #3; 5–10	East Maegashira #10; 8–7	West Maegashira #7; 10–5	East Maegashira #1; 6–9	East Maegashira #5; 8–7
1974	East Maegashira #2; 5–10 ★	West Maegashira #7; 8–7	East Maegashira #4; 12–3; T★	East Komusubi #1; 8–7	East Komusubi #1; 5–10	West Maegashira #4; 6–9
1975	East Maegashira #6; 9–6	East Maegashira #2; 8–7 ★	East Maegashira #1; 6–9 ★	West Maegashira #4; 9–6	East Maegashira #1; 6–9	East Maegashira #4; 6–9
1976	East Maegashira #7; 8–7	East Maegashira #5; 8–7	East Maegashira #1; 5–10	West Maegashira #5; 5–10	East Maegashira #10; 9–6	East Maegashira #4; 6–9
1977	West Maegashira #7; 10–5	East Komusubi #1; 5–10	East Maegashira #5; 8–7	East Maegashira #2; 8–7	East Maegashira #1; 5–10	East Maegashira #3; 4–11
1978	West Maegashira #9; 8–7	East Maegashira #6; 9–6	East Maegashira #2; 8–7	East Komusubi #1; 8–7	East Sekiwake #1; 8–7	East Sekiwake #1; 6–9
1979	East Maegashira #1; 6–9	West Maegashira #3; 8–7	East Maegashira #1; 6–9	East Maegashira #3; 8–7	East Komusubi #1; 8–7; T	West Sekiwake #1; 11–4; T
1980	East Sekiwake #1; 12–3; T	East Ōzeki #1; 3–5–7	West Ōzeki #1; 8–7	West Ōzeki #1; 9–6	West Ōzeki #1; 9–6	West Ōzeki #1; 3–12
1981	West Ōzeki #1; 10–5	West Ōzeki #1; Retired; 2–3	x	x	x	x
Record given as wins–losses–absences Top division champion Top division runner-up Retired Lower divisions Non-participation Sanshō key: F=Fighting spirit; O=Outstanding performance; T=Technique Also shown: ★=Kinboshi; P=Playoff(s); Divisions: Makuuchi — Jūryō — Makushita — Sandanme — Jonidan — Jonokuchi Makuuchi ranks: Yokozuna — Ōzeki — Sekiwake — Komusubi — Maegashira

== See also ==
- Glossary of sumo terms
- List of sumo tournament top division runners-up
- List of sumo tournament second division champions
- List of past sumo wrestlers
- List of ōzeki
