= Nakagawa (surname) =

Nakagawa (written: 中川, 仲川, 那珂川 or 那賀川) is a Japanese surname. Notable people with the surname include:

- Akiko Nakagawa (born 1973), Japanese voice actress
- Camila Nakagawa, Brazilian recurring contestant on The Challenge
- Daisuke Nakagawa (中川 大輔; born 1968), Japanese shogi player
- Eric Nakagawa of I Can Has Cheezburger?
- Haruka Nakagawa (born 1992), Japanese idol, member of JKT48
- Hidenao Nakagawa (born 1944), Japanese politician
- Kunio Nakagawa (1898–1944), colonel in the Imperial Japanese Army
- Nobuo Nakagawa (1905–1984), Japanese director
- Nakagawa Hidemasa (1568–1592), samurai
- Nakagawa Hidenari (1570–1612), Japanese daimyō
- Kiyoe Nakagawa (中川 清江; born 1951), Japanese swimmer
- Nakagawa Kiyohide (1556–1583), Japanese daimyō
- Masaharu Nakagawa (House of Representatives), member of the Japanese House of Representatives
- Masaharu Nakagawa (House of Councillors), member of the Japanese House of Councillors
- Miyuki Nakagawa (中川 未由希; born 1986), Japanese field hockey player
- Nakagawa Oyakata, Japanese sumo wrestler and head coach of Nakagawa stable
- Rieko Nakagawa (中川李枝子), a Japanese children's book writer and lyricist
- Ryoji Nakagawa, member of the Supreme Court of Japan
- Shoichi Nakagawa (1953–2009), Japanese politician
- Shoko Nakagawa (born 1985), Japanese idol
- So Nakagawa (中川 創; born 1999), Japanese footballer
- Soen Nakagawa (1907–1984), Japanese teacher of Zen Buddhism
- Stephen Nakagawa, (born 1994), ballet dancer with The Washington Ballet
- Teruhito Nakagawa (born 1992), Japanese footballer
- Tomoka Nakagawa (born 1981), Japanese professional wrestler
- Yūko Nakagawa (born 1958), Japanese politician
- Yuri Nakagawa, Japanese fashion model, public figure and fashion blogger

== Fictional characters ==
- Noriko Nakagawa and Yuka Nakagawa (Battle Royale)
- Shinji Nakagawa (Megazone 23)
- Kanon Nakagawa (The World God Only Knows)
- Shun Nakagawa (Gantz)
- Oran Nakagawa and her brother Hiroshi (Dead Dead Demon's Dededede Destruction)

== See also ==
- Japanese name
