= 2009 in sumo =

The following are the events in professional sumo during 2009.

== Tournaments ==
=== Hatsu basho ===
Ryogoku Kokugikan, Tokyo, 11 January – 25 January

2009 Hatsu basho results - Makuuchi Division
W		L		A	East			Rank	West			W		L		A
14	-	1	-	0		(Mongolia)	**Hakuhō**	Y		(Mongolia)	**Asashōryū***	14	-	1	-	0
2	-	10	-	3	ø	(Japan)	Kotomitsuki	O		(Japan)	**Chiyotaikai**	8	-	7	-	0
10	-	5	-	0		(Bulgaria)	**Kotoōshū**	O		(Japan)	**Kaiō**	8	-	7	-	0
8	-	7	-	0		(Mongolia)	**Harumafuji**	O	ø							
9	-	6	-	0		(Estonia)	**Baruto**	S	ø	(Japan)	Aminishiki	3	-	6	-	6
8	-	7	-	0		(Japan)	**Kisenosato**	K	ø	(Japan)	Toyonoshima	2	-	6	-	7
6	-	9	-	0		(Japan)	Kotoshōgiku	M1		(Mongolia)	**Kyokutenhō**	9	-	6	-	0
7	-	8	-	0		(Japan)	Miyabiyama	M2		(Japan)	Yoshikaze	6	-	9	-	0
7	-	8	-	0		(Japan)	Takekaze	M3		(Japan)	**Gōeidō**	10	-	5	-	0
7	-	8	-	0		(Japan)	Wakanosato	M4		(Georgia (country))	Kokkai	5	-	10	-	0
5	-	10	-	0		(Japan)	Futen'ō	M5		(Japan)	Takamisakari	6	-	9	-	0
2	-	13	-	0		(Japan)	Bushūyama	M6		(Russia)	Aran	5	-	10	-	0
9	-	6	-	0		(Japan)	**Hokutōriki**	M7		(Japan)	Dejima	7	-	8	-	0
6	-	9	-	0		(Mongolia)	Asasekiryū	M8		(Mongolia)	**Kakuryū**	9	-	6	-	0
5	-	10	-	0		(Japan)	Tosanoumi	M9		(Japan)	Chiyohakuhō	6	-	9	-	0
9	-	6	-	0		(Mongolia)	**Tokitenkū**	M10		(Japan)	**Tochinonada**	8	-	7	-	0
8	-	7	-	0		(Japan)	**Iwakiyama**	M11		(Georgia (country))	**Tochinoshin**	8	-	7	-	0
10	-	5	-	0		(Japan)	**Tochiōzan**	M12		(Japan)	**Kakizoe**	8	-	7	-	0
7	-	8	-	0		(Mongolia)	Tamawashi	M13		(Mongolia)	Kōryū	5	-	10	-	0
5	-	10	-	0		(Japan)	Toyohibiki	M14		(Japan)	Masatsukasa	4	-	11	-	0
11	-	4	-	0		(Japan)	**Tamanoshima**	M15		(Japan)	**Yamamotoyama**	8	-	7	-	0
11	-	4	-	0		(Japan)	**Hōmashō**	M16	ø							

ø - Indicates a pull-out or absent rank
**winning record in bold**
**Yusho Winner**
***Won Playoff**

=== Haru basho ===
Osaka Prefectural Gymnasium, Osaka, 15 – 29 March

2009 Haru basho results - Makuuchi Division
W		L		A	East			Rank	West			W		L		A
11	-	4	-	0		(Mongolia)	**Asashōryū**	Y		(Mongolia)	**Hakuhō**	15	-	0	-	0
10	-	5	-	0		(Bulgaria)	**Kotoōshū**	O		(Japan)	Chiyotaikai	2	-	13	-	0
8	-	7	-	0		(Japan)	**Kaiō**	O		(Mongolia)	**Harumafuji**	10	-	5	-	0
8	-	7	-	0		(Japan)	**Kotomitsuki**	O	ø							
8	-	7	-	0		(Estonia)	**Baruto**	S		(Japan)	Kisenosato	5	-	10	-	0
9	-	6	-	0		(Japan)	**Gōeidō**	K		(Mongolia)	Kyokutenhō	6	-	9	-	0
2	-	13	-	0		(Japan)	Hokutōriki	M1		(Mongolia)	**Kakuryū**	10	-	5	-	0
6	-	9	-	0		(Japan)	Kotoshōgiku	M2		(Japan)	**Tochiōzan**	8	-	7	-	0
4	-	11	-	0		(Japan)	Miyabiyama	M3		(Mongolia)	Tokitenkū	5	-	10	-	0
8	-	7	-	0		(Japan)	**Takekaze**	M4		(Japan)	Yoshikaze	7	-	8	-	0
6	-	6	-	3	ø	(Japan)	Wakanosato	M5		(Japan)	**Aminishiki**	9	-	6	-	0
8	-	7	-	0		(Japan)	**Tamanoshima**	M6		(Japan)	**Toyonoshima**	8	-	7	-	0
11	-	4	-	0		(Japan)	**Hōmashō**	M7		(Japan)	Takamisakari	6	-	9	-	0
8	-	7	-	0		(Japan)	**Tochinonada**	M8		(Georgia (country))	Kokkai	5	-	10	-	0
6	-	9	-	0		(Japan)	Dejima	M9		(Japan)	Futen'ō	7	-	8	-	0
8	-	7	-	0		**(Japan)**	**Iwakiyama**	M10		(Georgia (country))	Tochinoshin	6	-	9	-	0
9	-	6	-	0		**(Mongolia)**	**Asasekiryū**	M11		(Russia)	**Aran**	10	-	5	-	0
7	-	8	-	0		(Japan)	Kakizoe	M12		(Mongolia)	Shōtenrō	7	-	8	-	0
10	-	5	-	0		**(Japan)**	**Chiyohakuhō**	M13		(Japan)	**Yamamotoyama**	8	-	7	-	0
9	-	6	-	0		**(Mongolia)**	**Tamawashi**	M14		(Japan)	**Shimotori**	8	-	7	-	0
4	-	11	-	0		(Japan)	Tosanoumi	M15		(Japan)	Kimurayama	7	-	8	-	0
5	-	10	-	0		(Japan)	Toyozakura	M16	ø							

ø - Indicates a pull-out or absent rank
**winning record in bold**
**Yusho Winner**

=== Natsu basho ===
Ryogoku Kokugikan, Tokyo, 10 – 24 May

2009 Natsu basho results - Makuuchi Division
W		L		A	East		Rank	West			W		L		A
14	-	1	-	0	(Mongolia)	**Hakuhō**	Y		(Mongolia)	**Asashōryū**	12	-	3	-	0
9	-	6	-	0	(Bulgaria)	**Kotoōshū**	O		(Mongolia)	**Harumafuji***	14	-	1	-	0
8	-	7	-	0	(Japan)	**Kaiō**	O		(Japan)	**Kotomitsuki**	8	-	7	-	0
8	-	7	-	0	(Japan)	**Chiyotaikai**	O	ø							
4	-	11	-	0	(Estonia)	Baruto	S		(Japan)	Gōeidō	6	-	9	-	0
9	-	6	-	0	(Mongolia)	**Kakuryū**	K		(Japan)	Tochiōzan	6	-	9	-	0
1	-	14	-	0	(Japan)	Hōmashō	M1		(Japan)	Aminishiki	5	-	10	-	0
4	-	11	-	0	(Japan)	Takekaze	M2		(Mongolia)	**Kyokutenhō**	8	-	7	-	0
5	-	10	-	0	(Japan)	Tamanoshima	M3		(Japan)	Toyonoshima	5	-	10	-	0
13	-	2	-	0	(Japan)	**Kisenosato**	M4		(Russia)	**Aran**	8	-	7	-	0
5	-	10	-	0	(Japan)	Tochinonada	M5		(Japan)	Yoshikaze	4	-	11	-	0
10	-	5	-	0	(Japan)	**Kotoshōgiku**	M6	ø	(Japan)	Chiyohakuhō	2	-	3	-	10
5	-	10	-	0	**(Mongolia)**	Asasekiryū	M7	ø	(Japan)	Wakanosato	0	-	0	-	15
9	-	6	-	0	(Japan)	**Iwakiyama**	M8		(Mongolia)	Tamawashi	6	-	9	-	0
7	-	8	-	0	(Mongolia)	Tokitenkū	M9		(Japan)	Yamamotoyama	7	-	8	-	0
6	-	9	-	0	**(Japan)**	Futen'ō	M10		(Japan)	Shimotori	6	-	9	-	0
9	-	6	-	0	(Japan)	**Miyabiyama**	M11		(Japan)	**Toyohibiki**	11	-	4	-	0
9	-	6	-	0	(Japan)	**Takamisakari**	M12		(Japan)	Dejima	7	-	8	-	0
4	-	11	-	0	**(Japan)**	Hokutōriki	M13		(Georgia (country))	**Tochinoshin**	9	-	6	-	0
8	-	7	-	0	(Georgia (country))	**Kokkai**	M14		(Japan)	**Kakizoe**	8	-	7	-	0
8	-	7	-	0	**(Mongolia)**	**Shōtenrō**	M15		(Japan)	**Bushūyama**	9	-	6	-	0
5	-	10	-	0	(Japan)	Kimurayama	M16	ø							

ø - Indicates a pull-out or absent rank
**winning record in bold**
**Yusho Winner**
***Won Playoff**

=== Nagoya basho ===
Aichi Prefectural Gymnasium, Nagoya, 12 – 26 July

2009 Nagoya basho results - Makuuchi Division
W		L		A	East			Rank	West			W		L		A
14	-	1	-	0		(Mongolia)	**Hakuhō**	Y		(Mongolia)	**Asashōryū**	10	-	5	-	0
9	-	6	-	0		(Mongolia)	**Harumafuji**	O		(Bulgaria)	**Kotoōshū**	13	-	2	-	0
8	-	7	-	0		(Japan)	**Kaiō**	O		(Japan)	**Kotomitsuki**	12	-	3	-	0
8	-	7	-	0		(Japan)	**Chiyotaikai**	O	ø							
5	-	10	-	0		(Mongolia)	Kakuryū	S		(Japan)	**Kisenosato**	9	-	6	-	0
6	-	9	-	0		(Mongolia)	Kyokutenhō	K		(Japan)	**Kotoshōgiku**	8	-	7	-	0
4	-	11	-	0		(Russia)	Aran	M1		(Japan)	Gōeidō	5	-	10	-	0
2	-	13	-	0		(Japan)	Tochiōzan	M2		(Japan)	Toyohibiki	3	-	12	-	0
5	-	10	-	0		(Japan)	Iwakiyama	M3		(Estonia)	**Baruto**	11	-	4	-	0
8	-	7	-	0		(Japan)	**Miyabiyama**	M4		(Japan)	Takamisakari	6	-	9	-	0
11	-	4	-	0		(Japan)	**Aminishiki**	M5		(Georgia (country))	**Tochinoshin**	9	-	6	-	0
5	-	10	-	0		(Japan)	Bushūyama	M6		(Japan)	**Tamanoshima**	9	-	6	-	0
8	-	7	-	0		(Japan)	**Toyonoshima**	M7		(Mongolia)	Mōkonami	6	-	9	-	0
5	-	10	-	0		(Georgia (country))	Kokkai	M8		(Japan)	Kakizoe	6	-	9	-	0
8	-	7	-	0		(Japan)	**Takekaze**	M9		(Japan)	Tochinonada	6	-	9	-	0
11	-	4	-	0		**(Mongolia)**	**Shōtenrō**	M10		(Mongolia)	**Tokitenkū**	9	-	6	-	0
4	-	7	-	4	ø	(Japan)	Yamamotoyama	M11		(Mongolia)	Tamawashi	5	-	10	-	0
9	-	6	-	0		**(Mongolia)**	**Asasekiryū**	M12		(Japan)	Yoshikaze	6	-	9	-	0
6	-	9	-	0		**(Japan)**	Futen'ō	M13	ø	(Japan)	Dejima	2	-	13	-	0
9	-	6	-	0		**(Japan)**	**Shimotori**	M14		(Japan)	**Tosayutaka**	8	-	7	-	0
10	-	5	-	0		(Japan)	**Hōmashō**	M15		(South Korea)	**Kasugaō**	8	-	7	-	0
4	-	11	-	0		(Japan)	Wakakōyū	M16	ø							

ø - Indicates a pull-out or absent rank
**winning record in bold**
**Yusho Winner**

=== Aki basho ===
Ryogoku Kokugikan, Tokyo, 13 – 27 September

2009 Aki basho results - Makuuchi Division
W		L		A	East			Rank	West			W		L		A
14	-	1	-	0		(Mongolia)	**Hakuhō**	Y		(Mongolia)	**Asashōryū***	14	-	1	-	0
9	-	6	-	0		(Bulgaria)	**Kotoōshū**	O		(Japan)	**Kotomitsuki**	9	-	6	-	0
9	-	6	-	0		(Mongolia)	**Harumafuji**	O		(Japan)	**Kaiō**	8	-	7	-	0
2	-	9	-	4	ø	(Japan)	Chiyotaikai	O	ø							
7	-	8	-	0		(Japan)	Kisenosato	S		(Japan)	Kotoshōgiku	6	-	9	-	0
12	-	3	-	0		(Estonia)	**Baruto**	K		(Japan)	Aminishiki	7	-	8	-	0
4	-	11	-	0		(Georgia (country))	Tochinoshin	M1		(Japan)	Miyabiyama	4	-	11	-	0
2	-	13	-	0		**(Mongolia)**	Shōtenrō	M2		(Mongolia)	Kyokutenhō	5	-	10	-	0
5	-	10	-	0		(Japan)	Tamanoshima	M3		(Mongolia)	**Kakuryū**	11	-	4	-	0
7	-	8	-	0		(Japan)	Toyonoshima	M4		(Mongolia)	**Tokitenkū**	8	-	7	-	0
10	-	5	-	0		(Japan)	Gōeidō	M5		(Japan)	**Takekaze**	9	-	6	-	0
6	-	9	-	0		**(Mongolia)**	Asasekiryū	M6		(Japan)	Hōmashō	7	-	8	-	0
7	-	8	-	0		(Russia)	Aran	M7		(Japan)	Takamisakari	6	-	9	-	0
8	-	7	-	0		(Japan)	**Iwakiyama**	M8		(Japan)	Shimotori	4	-	11	-	0
5	-	10	-	0		(Mongolia)	Mōkonami	M9		(Japan)	Toyohibiki	6	-	9	-	0
6	-	9	-	0		(Japan)	Tosayutaka	M10		(Japan)	**Bushūyama**	10	-	5	-	0
9	-	6	-	0		(Japan)	**Kakizoe**	M11		(South Korea)	Kasugaō	6	-	9	-	0
11	-	4	-	0		(Japan)	**Tochiōzan**	M12		(Japan)	Tochinonada	4	-	11	-	0
6	-	9	-	0		**(Japan)**	Tamaasuka	M13		(Japan)	**Wakanosato**	10	-	5	-	0
8	-	7	-	0		(Georgia (country))	**Kokkai**	M14		(Japan)	**Hokutōriki**	11	-	4	-	0
9	-	6	-	0		(Japan)	**Yoshikaze**	M15		(Japan)	Futen'ō	5	-	10	-	0
7	-	8	-	0		(Japan)	Masatsukasa	M16	ø							

ø - Indicates a pull-out or absent rank
**winning record in bold**
**Yusho Winner**
***Won Playoff**

=== Kyushu basho ===
Fukuoka International Centre, Kyushu, 15 – 29 November

2009 Kyushu basho results - Makuuchi Division
W		L		A	East			Rank	West			W		L		A
11	-	4	-	0		(Mongolia)	**Asashōryū**	Y		(Mongolia)	**Hakuhō**	15	-	0	-	0
10	-	5	-	0		(Bulgaria)	**Kotoōshū**	O		(Japan)	**Kotomitsuki**	8	-	7	-	0
9	-	6	-	0		(Mongolia)	**Harumafuji**	O		(Japan)	**Kaiō**	8	-	7	-	0
2	-	9	-	4	ø	(Japan)	Chiyotaikai	O	ø							
9	-	6	-	0		(Estonia)	Baruto	S		(Mongolia)	Kakuryū	7	-	8	-	0
6	-	9	-	0		(Japan)	**Kisenosato**	K		(Japan)	Gōeidō	7	-	8	-	0
6	-	9	-	0		(Japan)	Takekaze	M1		(Japan)	Aminishiki	5	-	10	-	0
10	-	5	-	0		(Japan)	**Kotoshōgiku**	M2		(Mongolia)	Tokitenkū	5	-	10	-	0
5	-	10	-	0		(Japan)	Tochiōzan	M3		(Japan)	Bushūyama	6	-	9	-	0
8	-	7	-	0		(Japan)	**Hokutōriki**	M4		(Japan)	Iwakiyama	2	-	13	-	0
11	-	4	-	0		(Japan)	**Toyonoshima**	M5		(Japan)	**Kakizoe**	8	-	7	-	0
7	-	8	-	0		(Japan)	Wakanosato	M6		(Mongolia)	**Kyokutenhō**	8	-	7	-	0
4	-	11	-	0		(Japan)	Tamanoshima	M7		(Japan)	Hōmashō	6	-	9	-	0
7	-	8	-	0		(Russia)	Aran	M8		(Georgia (country))	**Tochinoshin**	12	-	3	-	0
10	-	5	-	0		(Japan)	**Yoshikaze**	M9		(Japan)	**Miyabiyama**	12	-	3	-	0
8	-	7	-	0		**(Mongolia)**	**Asasekiryū**	M10		(Georgia (country))	**Kokkai**	8	-	7	-	0
10	-	5	-	0		**(Mongolia)**	**Tamawashi**	M11		(Japan)	**Takamisakari**	8	-	7	-	0
9	-	6	-	0		**(Mongolia)**	**Shōtenrō**	M12		(Japan)	Toyohibiki	5	-	10	-	0
8	-	7	-	0		**(Japan)**	**Tosayutaka**	M13		(Mongolia)	**Mōkonami**	9	-	6	-	0
3	-	12	-	0		(South Korea)	Kasugaō	M14		(Japan)	Kimurayama	4	-	11	-	0
2	-	12	-	1	ø	(Japan)	Yamamotoyama	M15		(Japan)	**Shimotori**	8	-	7	-	0
3	-	5	-	7	ø	(Japan)	Tamaasuka	M16	ø							

ø - Indicates a pull-out or absent rank
**winning record in bold**
**Yusho Winner**

== News ==
=== January ===
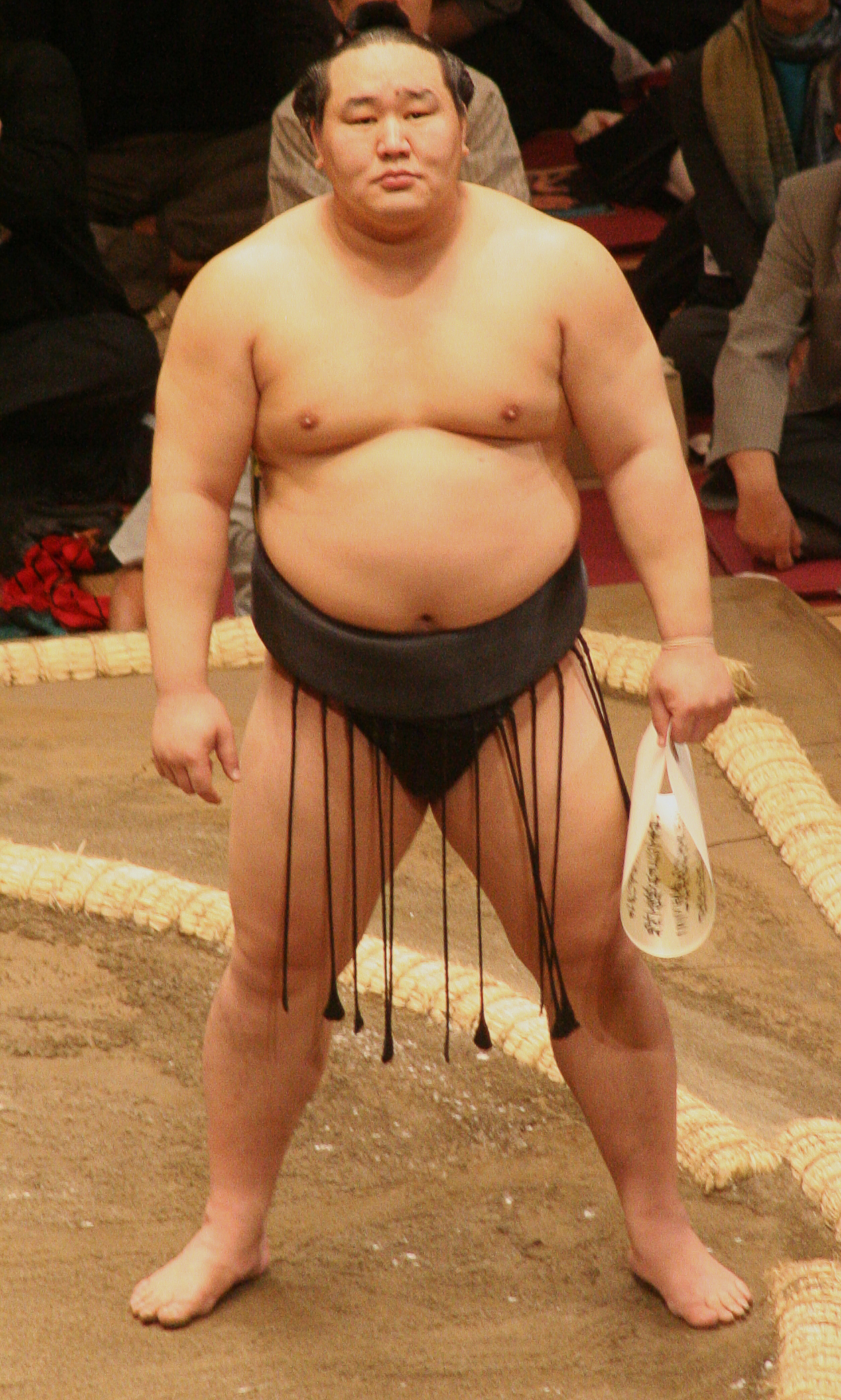
Asashoryu

- 11–25: At the Hatsu-basho, yokozuna Asashoryu comes back from three tournaments out injured to defeat his fellow yokozuna Hakuho in a playoff on the final day to claim his 23rd tournament championship with a 14–1 record, putting him in sole possession of fourth place on the all-time list. His only defeat in the tournament is to Hakuho in their regular match. Hakuho is denied his fourth straight championship and has to settle for the runner-up position. New ozeki Harumafuji barely makes his kachi-koshi with eight wins. Goeido wins ten bouts and receives the Ginosho or Technique Prize. Homasho, who has fallen to maegashira 16 in the rankings, scores an impressive 11–4 and is awarded the Fighting Spirit Prize. Shotenro wins his second straight juryo division championship and promotion to the top makuuchi division. Former maegashira Katayama announces his retirement, and leaves the sumo world.
- 29: Japan Sumo Association chairman Musashigawa criticises Asashoryu for raising his arms above his head whilst still on the dohyo in the aftermath of his playoff win.
- 30: Juryo and former maegashira wrestler Wakakirin is arrested for cannabis possession at a CD store in Tokyo's Roppongi district that had been monitored by police for some time. He is the fourth wrestler after Wakanoho, Roho and Hakurozan, to be caught up in a drug scandal, but the first Japanese. At the drug tests in September 2008 that led to the dismissals of Roho and Hakurozan, Wakakirin's sample was borderline before eventually being declared negative.
- 31: The retirement ceremonies of Tochisakae and Tochinohana take place at the Kokugikan.

=== February ===
- 1: At a meeting of the elders of the Japan Sumo Association, Wakakirin is dismissed from sumo. His stablemaster Oguruma, who had already submitted Wakakirin's retirement papers, is given a pay cut for three months and demoted.
- 8: Hakuho wins the one-day Japan Ozumo Tournament held at the Kokugikan in Tokyo. Although unofficial, the tournament is sponsored by Fuji Television and the Sankei newspaper and offers a large amount of prize money (3 million yen for the victor). Asashoryu, the winner of the tournament for the last three years, is defeated in the semi-finals by Kotoōshū.
- 12: Junichi Yamamoto, the former head of the Tokitsukaze stable, goes on trial at the District Court in Nagoya for his involvement in the death in June 2007 of one of his junior wrestlers, Takashi Saito. He denies ordering three of his wrestlers to beat Saito.

=== March ===
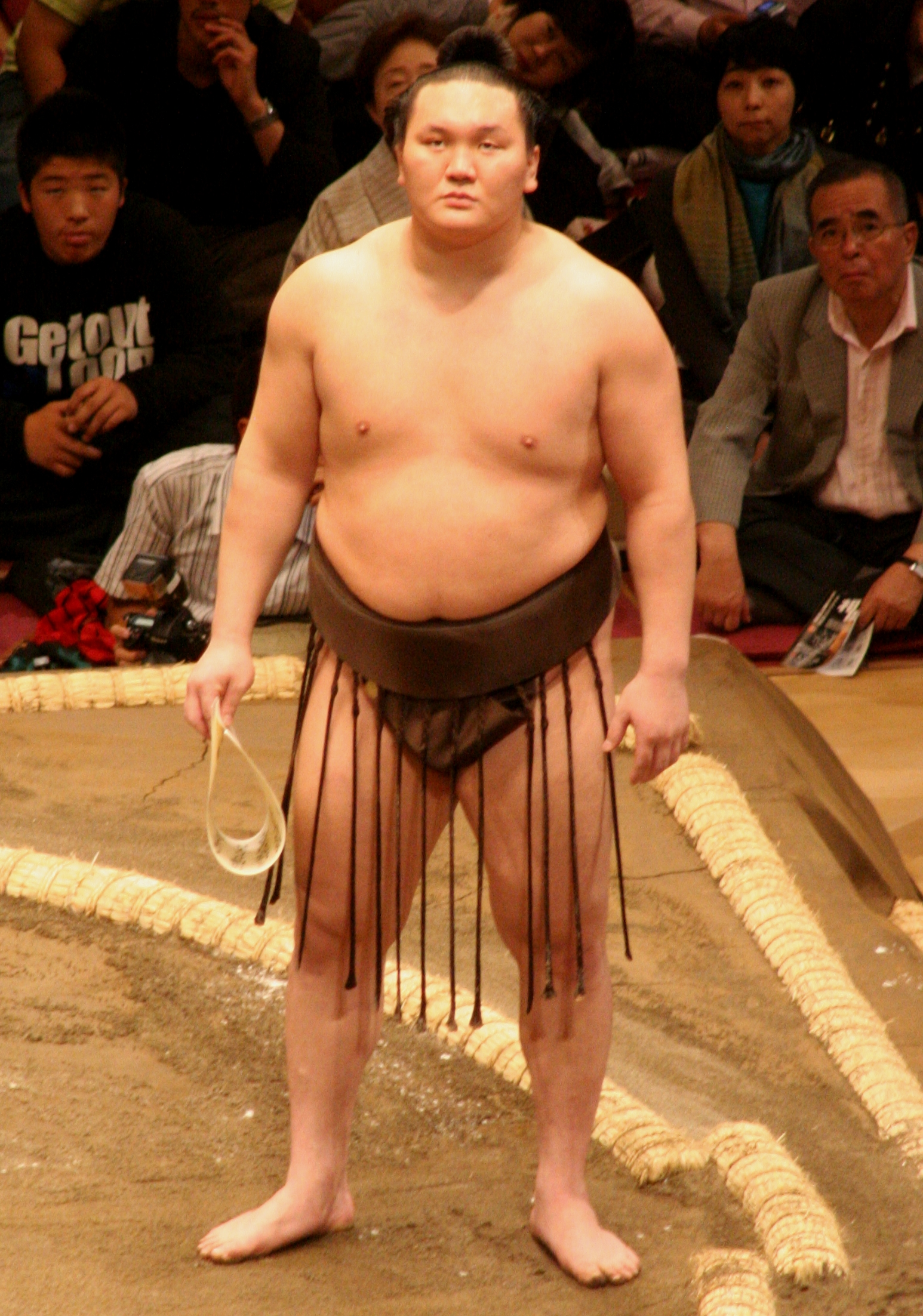
Hakuho

- 2: The banzuke for the upcoming tournament in Osaka is released. Due to his playoff victory, Asashoryu is listed as the East Yokozuna, with Hakuho moved to the West side. Kisenosato makes his debut at sekiwake, and Shotenro is ranked at maegashira 12. Hakkaku stable's Okinoumi, previously known as Fukuoka, makes his debut in the juryo division halfway up the ranks at no.7 after a 7–0 yusho at makushita 1 the previous tourney.
- 5: The Tokyo District Court awards Kitanoumi and the Sumo Association 15.4 million yen (154,000 USD) in damages after ruling against Kodansha, the publishers of Shukan Gendai, who alleged that he threw a bout for the championship in 1975.
- 17: Roho and Hakurozan's lawsuit against the Sumo Association claiming unfair dismissal is rejected.
- 26: A second ruling by the court awards Asashoryu and 29 other wrestlers representing the Association 42.9 million yen for another article in the Shukan Gendai alleging that Asashoryu had thrown bouts in November 2006.
- 29: At the Haru basho in Osaka, Hakuho wins his tenth championship with an unbeaten 15–0 score. Asashoryu finishes four wins behind on 11–4. Homasho also wins eleven and is rewarded with his second successive Fighting Spirit Prize. Kakuryu gets the Technique Award. Ozeki Chiyotaikai finishes on 2–13, the worst score ever recorded by an ozeki fighting the full 15 days. Toyohibiki wins his second juryo championship with a 12–3 score and earns promotion back to the top division. Former maegashira Otsukasa, who at 38 years is the oldest active sekitori, announces his retirement. He will stay in the sumo world as Wakafuji Oyakata.

=== April ===
- 5: The Spring tour begins with a ceremonial tournament in the Ise Shrine, Mie Prefecture.
- 10: A ceremonial tournament is held at the Yasukuni Shrine in Chiyoda, Tokyo.
- 11: The tour visits Fujisawa, Kanagawa Prefecture.
- 13: The former Wakakirin appears at the Yokohama District Court and pleads guilty to cannabis possession.
- 18: The regional tour goes to Nagano, Nagano Prefecture.
- 19: The tour concludes at Tochigi, Tochigi Prefecture.
- 22: Wakakirin is sentenced to ten months in prison, but suspended for three years.
- 22: The Sumo Association carries out random drug tests on 104 wrestlers and coaches from the Musashigawa, Tokitsukaze, Ōshima, Ōnomatsu and Takasago stables at the Kokugikan. The tests (for recreational drugs only) were conducted by the WADA-certified Mitsubishi Chemical Medience Corp. All test negative.
- 27: The banzuke for the May tournament is released, showing Goeido at sekiwake and Kakuryu and Tochiozan at komusubi for the first time. There are no wrestlers making their makuuchi or juryo debuts for the first time since July 2003.
- 29: The Yokozuna Deliberation Council joint practice session, attended by the sekitori ranked wrestlers, is held in public for the first time, with around 5000 spectators in the Kokugikan. Asashoryu and Hakuho participate but do not fight each other. Instead, Hakuho fights eleven matches against the ozeki, losing twice to Kotoōshū, while Asashoryu goes undefeated in eight bouts against Kakuryu and other maegashira.

=== May ===
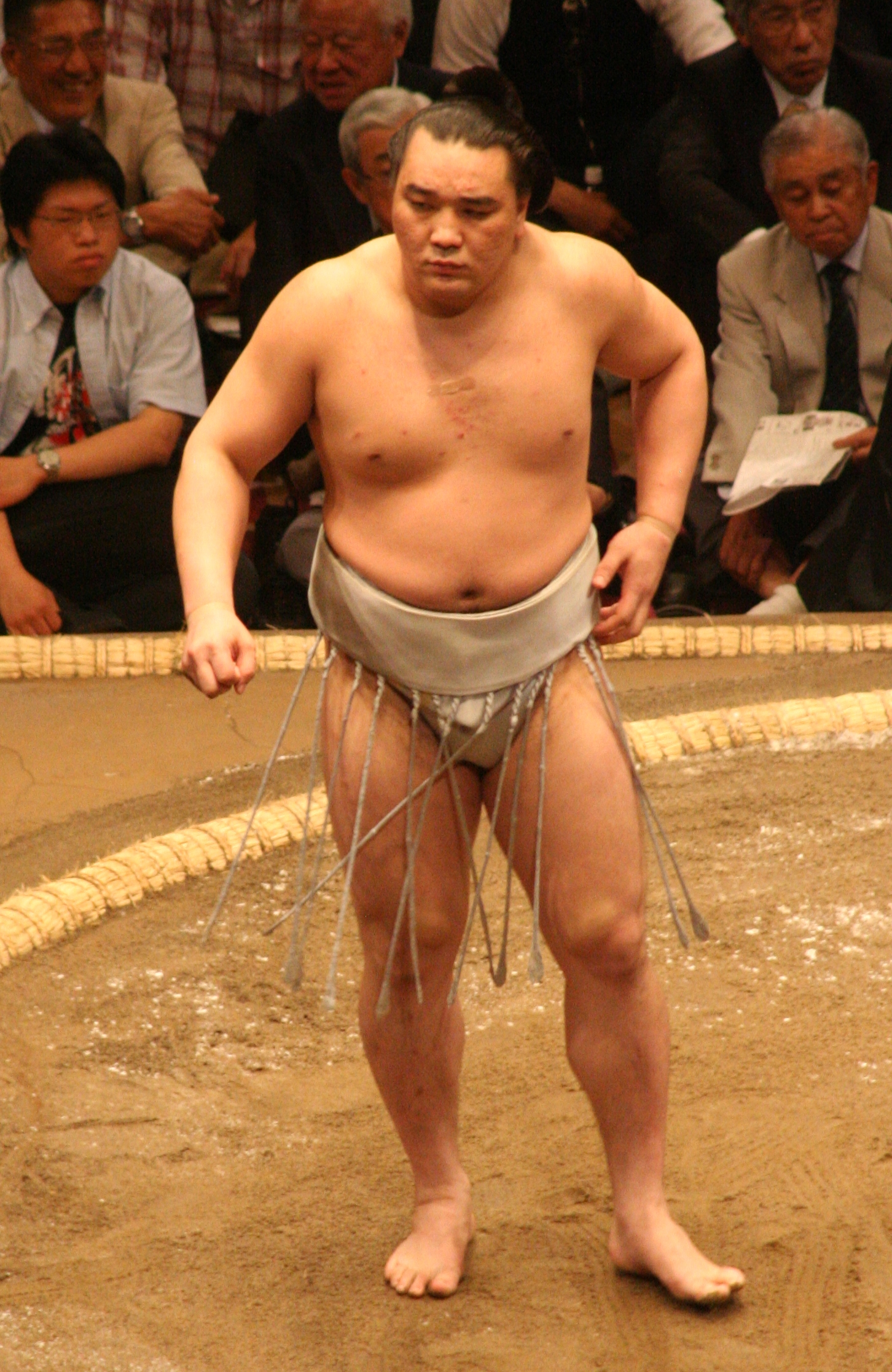
Harumafuji

- 8: A group of Mongolian rikishi, including both yokozuna, play golf together in Chiba Prefecture two days before the start of the Natsu basho, attracting criticism from elders within the Sumo Association.
- 10–24: At the Natsu basho in Tokyo, Hakuho's 33 bout winning streak in regulation matches is brought to an end by Kotoōshū on Day 14. Hakuho and Harumafuji enter the final day tied on 13–1, Harumafuji's only loss thus far being to Hakuho. Harumafuji defeats Kotoōshū while Hakuho beats Asashoryu. The subsequent playoff is won by Harumafuji who becomes the eighth foreigner to win a top division championship. Third place goes to Kisenosato, who rebounds from losing his sekiwake rank in the previous tournament by compiling a superb 13–2 score and is awarded the Fighting Spirit Prize. The Technique award goes to Kakuryu, who holds his rank in his komusubi debut with a 9–6 record. Kadoban ozeki Chiyotaikai, who has been struggling with diabetes and has dropped to 144 kg in weight, wins his last three matches to stave off demotion with an 8–7 mark. The juryo division championship goes to Tamaasuka with a 12–3 record. He finishes one win ahead of Mokonami who, at Juryo 1, is guaranteed promotion to makuuchi for the first time. The makushita championship is won by Mongolian Tokusegawa with a perfect 7–0 record. Former maegashira Ushiomaru retires.
- 29: Junichi Yamamoto is sentenced to six years in prison, with the judge saying his "immeasurable power" as head of the Tokitsukaze stable led to abuse which "grossly disrespected the victim's human dignity." Yamamoto appeals against the ruling.
- 30: Tamakasuga's retirement ceremony or danpatsu-shiki takes place at the Kokugikan.

=== June ===
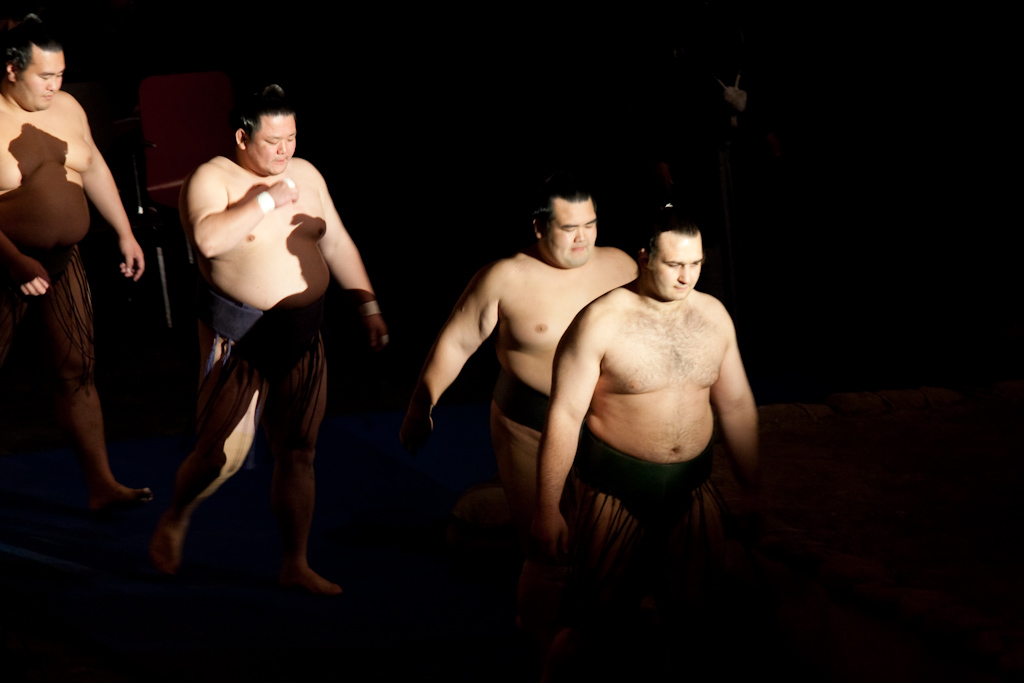
Sadogatake stable wrestlers appear at the Heineken Music Hall, Amsterdam in June

- 5–6: The Sadogatake stable travel to Amsterdam for a two-day exhibition tournament at the Heineken Music Hall, to celebrate 400 years of trade relationships between the Netherlands and Japan.
- 8: 103 wrestlers and other members of the Kokonoe, Miyagino, Dewanoumi, Hanaregoma and Kataonami stables are given doping tests for recreational drugs.
- 10: Testing is carried out on 111 personnel from the Sadogatake, Oguruma, Isegahama, Nishikido and Irumagawa stables.
- 16: The head of the Azumazeki stable, former sekiwake Takamiyama, reaches the mandatory retirement age of 65 and retires. He is replaced by Ushiomaru.
- 19: 110 people from the Azumazeki, Asahiyama, Arashio, Hanakago, Kasugayama, Shikoroyama and Tagonoura stables are drug tested.
- 29: The banzuke for the Nayoga tournament is released. Kakuryu makes his debut at sekiwake. Three wrestlers make their makuuchi debuts: Tatsunami stable's Mōkonami, Tosayutaka of the Tokitsukaze stable and Wakakoyu of the Onomatsu stable. Kasugao returns to the top division. Kitazakura becomes, at 37, the second oldest man since World War II to return to the jūryō division.

=== July ===
- 20: Hidenoyama Oyakata, the former sekiwake Hasegawa, turns 65 and retires.
- 26: At the Nagoya basho, Hakuho defeats Asashoryu on the final day for the fourth time in a row to claim his eleventh yusho with a 14–1 record. Kotoōshū is runner-up on 13–2, one win ahead of stablemate and Nagoya native Kotomitsuki on 12–3. Asashoryu is well out of the running on 10–5, and Harumafuji finishes with a disappointing 9–6. Aminishiki gets his fourth Technique Award after a fine 11–4 score. Shotenro also wins eleven and receives the Fighting Spirit prize in his third makuuchi tournament. The juryo championship is won by veteran Wakanosato for the fourth time. Former ozeki Dejima announces his retirement after suffering nine losses in eleven days. He will stay in sumo as Onaruto Oyakata.

=== August ===
- 5: Sendagawa Oyakata, the former sekiwake Akinoshima, swaps toshiyori names with former ozeki Maenoyama, who is close to retirement age, and becomes head coach of the Takadagawa stable.
- The summer tour takes place at the following locations:

7: Sukagawa, Fukushima Prefecture
8: Soma, Fukushima Prefecture
9: Sapporo, Hokkaido Prefecture
10: Asahikawa, Hokkaido Prefecture
12: Hirosaki, Aomori Prefecture
13: Akita, Akita Prefecture
15: Hachimantai, Iwate Prefecture. Some wrestlers come down with the H1N1 flu, and masks are distributed to spectators while the children's sumo event is cancelled.
22: Honjo, Saitama Prefecture
23: Yamanakako, Yamanashi Prefecture

- 24: Asashoryu is criticised for refusing to board a bus transporting wrestlers to training on the summer tour for fear of catching the H1N1 flu strain.
- 26: Drug tests are carried out on 104 personnel of the Minato, Sakaigawa, Naruto, Tatsunami, Magaki and Tamanoi stables.
- 31: The banzuke for the September tournament is issued. Kotoshogiku, Baruto and Aminishiki return to the sanyaku ranks. Tamaasuka returns to the top division for the first time in 23 tournaments. Sotairyu, from Tokitsukaze stable, Kise stable's Tokushinho and Oguruma stable's Mongolian Hoshikaze make their juryo debuts.

=== September ===
- 3: The head of the Tamanoi stable, the former sekiwake Tochiazuma Tomoyori, turns 65 and retires. His son, the former ozeki Tochiazuma Daisuke, takes over.
- 7: 96 personnel from the Takanohana, Michinoku, Kasugano, Mihogaseki, Takashima, and Kagamiyama stables are drug tested.
- 27: At the Aki basho, Asashoryu's run of 14 consecutive victories is ended by Hakuho, who was one win behind having surprisingly lost to Shotenro earlier in the tournament. Asashoryu wins the playoff to claim his 24th championship, bringing him level with Kitanoumi in third place on the all-time list. It is Hakuho's third successive playoff defeat, and despite scoring 14–1 or better in five consecutive tournaments (an unprecedented feat), he has only two yusho to show for it. Baruto, who has defeated all five ozeki this tournament, finishes on 12–3 and receives his fourth Fighting Spirit prize. The Technique Award goes to Kakuryu who scores 11–4. Bushuyama (10–5) would have received a share of the Fighting Spirit prize had he not been defeated by Aran in his final bout. Ozeki Kaio secures his kachi-koshi in his record-equalling 97th top division tournament, having earlier surpassed Oshio's 964 career wins to move into second place all-time. His fellow ozeki Chiyotaikai had already withdrawn on Day 11 having lost eight matches. The juryo championship is won by Tamawashi with an 11–4 score, who secures an immediate return to the top division. Georgian Gagamaru wins the makushita championship.
- 27: Asashoryu and his stablemaster apologise after the yokozuna once again raises his arms in victory (the so-called "guts pose") while still on the dohyo after defeating Hakuho.

=== October ===
- 2: Harumafuji wins the 68th All Japan Rikishi 1 Day tournament held at the Kokugikan. He defeats Takamisakari in the semifinals and Iwakiyama in the final, and receives 500,000 yen in prize money. Hakuho is eliminated in the first round by Tokitenku, and Asashoryu in the second by Bushuyama.
- 7: 110 personnel from the Hakkaku, Chiganoura, Takadagawa, Kiriyama and Matsugane stables are drug tested.
- 15: Drug tests are carried out on 104 people from the Otake, Kise, Isenoumi, Izutsu, Minezaki, Onoe and Oitekaze stables.
- 17: The ninth and final batch of drug tests comprises 97 members of the Kitanoumi, Nishonoseki, Shibatayama, Nakamura, Shikihide and Tomozuna stables.
- The autumn regional tour visits the following locations:

18: Yokohama, Kanagawa Prefecture
23: Himeji, Hyogo Prefecture
24–25: Uji, Kyoto Prefecture
26: Takahashi, Okayama Prefecture
29: Sukumo, Kōchi Prefecture
30–31: Hiroshima

=== November ===
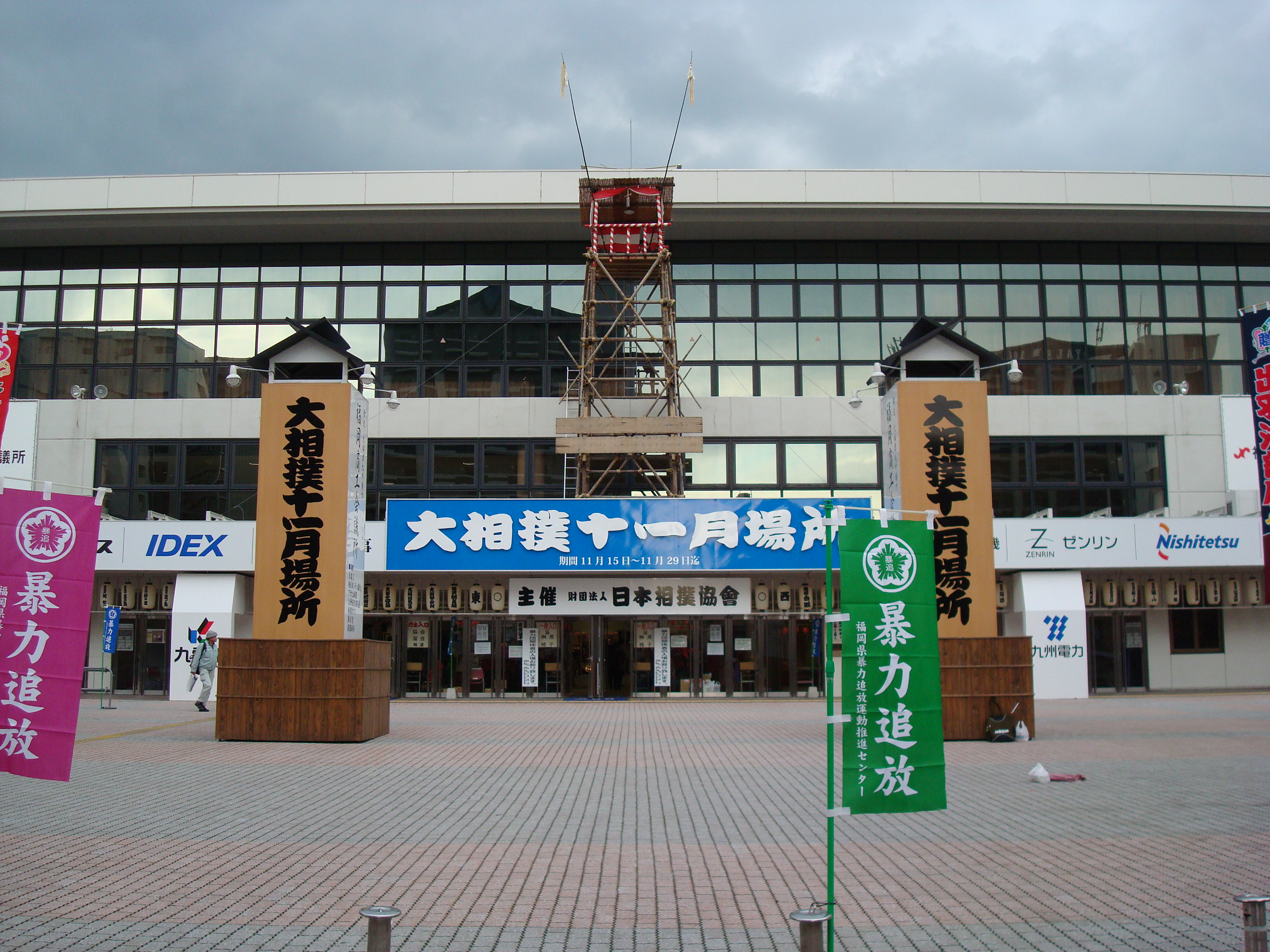
The Fukuoka International Center in November 2009

- 1: The tour concludes at Shunan, Yamaguchi Prefecture.
- 2: The banzuke for the Kyushu tournament is released. Asashoryu returns to the prestigious East Yokozuna position following his playoff win, and Kaio is listed in the makuuchi division for a record 98th time. Chiyotaikai is kadoban for a record 14th time. For the first time since 2003, there are no rikishi making their sanyaku or makuuchi debuts for the second tournament in a row.
- 9:The Tokyo District Court awards Kitanoumi and the Sumo Association 3.85 million yen in damages over an article published in the Shukan Gendai in June 2007, alleging that the ex-chairman had ordered Hakuho's stablemaster Miyagino to mediate in the fixing of a bout between Hakuho and Asashoryu on the final day of the July 2006 tournament.
- 22:The Sumo association announces that all those involved in the latest rounds of drug tests are clean. This means that all those tested since the process began in April have come back negative.
- 29: At the Kyushu basho Hakuho wins his third championship of the year, with a perfect 15–0 record. He also breaks Asashoryu's record set in 2005 of most wins in a calendar year, by establishing a new mark of 86 wins out of 90 regulation bouts. Runners up on 12–3 are two maegashira, Tochinoshin and Miyabiyama, who share the Fighting Spirit prize. Toyonoshima wins eleven and receives the Technique Award. Chiyotaikai is demoted from ozeki after a record 65 consecutive tournaments after suffering his eighth defeat against Asashoryu on Day 10. Asashoryu himself gets to 11–0 before losing his last four bouts to Harumafuji, Kotomitsuki, Kotoōshū and (for the sixth time in a row) Hakuho. The juryo championship is won by former maegashira Kitataiki who wins a three-way playoff after a 10–5 score.

=== December ===
- The winter regional tour visits the following locations:
  - 6–7: Kumamoto, Kumamoto Prefecture
  - 9: Nogata, Fukuoka Prefecture
  - 12: Kurume, Fukuoka Prefecture
  - 13: Yamaga, Kumamoto Prefecture
  - 15–16: Urasoe, Okinawa Prefecture
- The Tokyo High Court upholds the 26 March ruling against Kodansha, but reduces the damages to 39.6 million yen from 42.9 million, with Asashoryu's original amount being reduced to 7.7 million from 11 million. The judge calls the articles "sloppy journalism."
- 21: The banzuke for the forthcoming Hatsu basho in January 2010 is released. For the first time in 66 tournaments, Chiyotaikai is listed as a sekiwake. Two wrestlers are making their juryo debuts – a Chinese citizen from Inner Mongolia, Sokokurai, and former college champion Myogiryu.

== Deaths ==
- 1 March: Former maegashira Onobori, aged 83.
- 7 June: Former maegashira Daikiko, the first sekitori from Musashigawa stable, aged 41, of a cerebral haemorrhage.

== See also ==
- Glossary of sumo terms
- List of active sumo wrestlers
- List of past sumo wrestlers
- List of years in sumo
- List of yokozuna
