= Masaharu Nakagawa =

Masaharu Nakagawa may refer to:

- Masaharu Nakagawa (House of Representatives), member of the Japanese House of Representatives and Minister of Education, Culture, Sports, Science and Technology in the cabinet of prime minister Yoshihiko Noda
- Masaharu Nakagawa (House of Councillors), member of the Japanese House of Councillors

== See also ==
- Nakagawa (surname)
