= Tokifudō Kō =

Japanese sumo wrestler (born 2003)

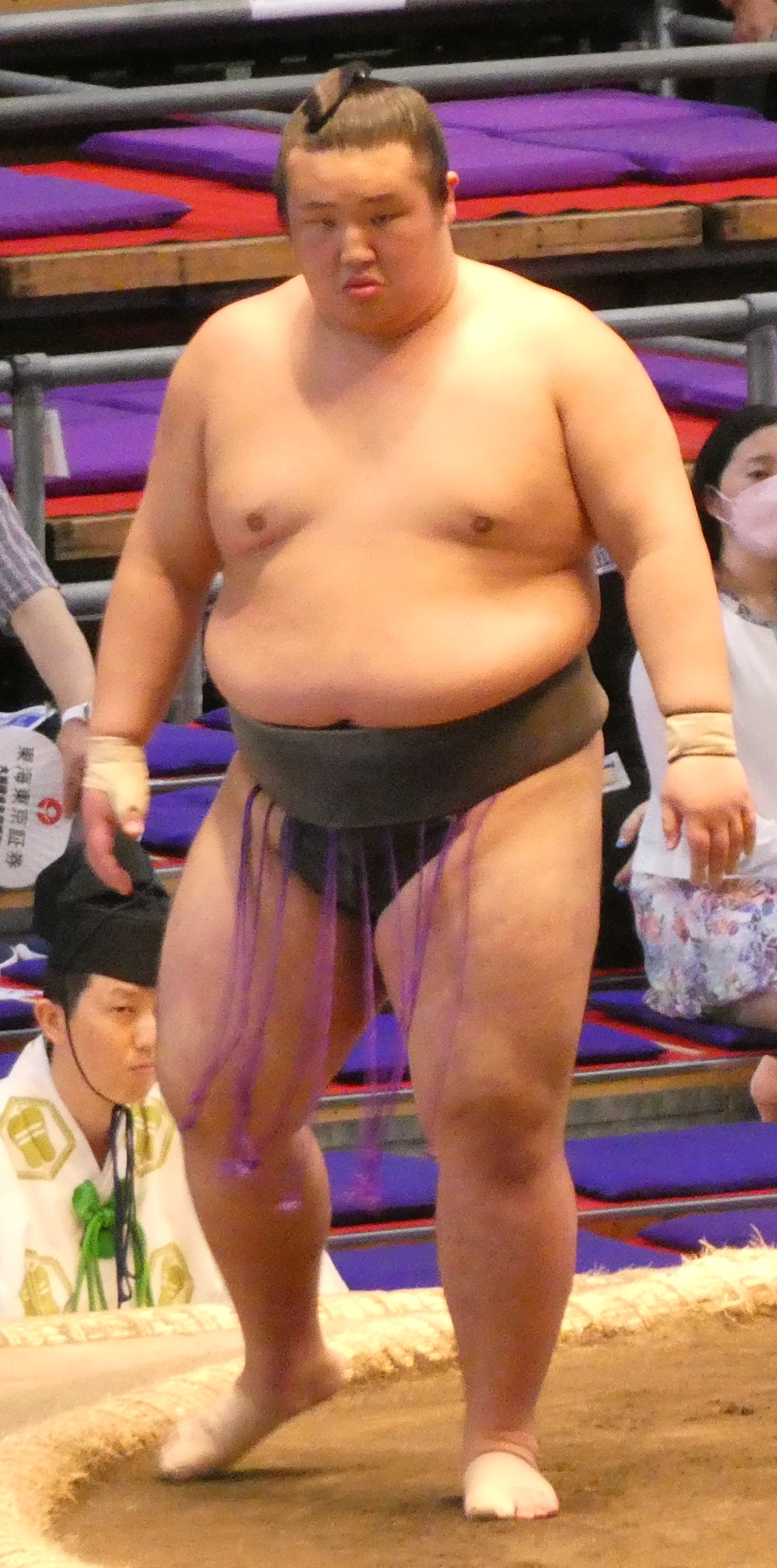

Personal information
- Native name: 時不動 虹
- Born: Kō Yoshii; August 1, 2003 (age 23) Yaizu, Shizuoka Prefecture, Japan
- Height: 1.79 m (5 ft 10 1/2 in)
- Weight: 173 kg (381 lb; 27.2 st)

Sport
- Sport: Sumo
- Rank: see below
- Heya: Nakagawa→Tokitsukaze
- Debut: March 2019
- Highest rank: Jūryō 13 (September 2026)
- Championships: 1 (Makushita)
- Updated on August 31, 2026

Tokifudō Kō (Japanese 時不動 虹) (birth name Kō Yoshii (吉井 虹)), born August 1, 2003, is an active sumo wrestler from Yaizu City, Shizuoka Prefecture, belonging to the Tokitsukaze stable. He turned pro directly after graduating junior high school and has spent most of his pro sumo career in the Makushita division. His highest rank was Juryo 13. He won the Makushita yusho championship in July 2022.

== History ==
Tokifudo has been practicing judo since he was 5 years old, but after winning a local sumo tournament, he started attending the local Yaizu Sumo Club. In his 5th year of elementary school, he reached the top 16 in the National Children's Sumo Tournament, and in junior high, he won the title of Junior High School Yokozuna. After graduating from junior school, he joined the Nakagawa stable of professional sumo and made his debut in the March 2019 tournament.

== Career ==
In the May 2019 tournament, his first time in the Jonokuchi division, Tokifudo achieved a winning record of 5 wins and 2 losses. In the following July tournament, after being promoted to the Jonidan division, he also advanced in just one tournament with a record of 6 wins and 1 loss. After being promoted to the Sandanme division, he achieved winning records for four consecutive tournaments, and in May 2020 he was promoted to the Makushita division at the age of 16 years, 8 months, and 26 days. This was the third youngest promotion in history for a sumo wrestler who made his debut after 1972, when entry into sumo before graduating from junior high school was prohibited.

In July 2020, just before the July tournament, Tokifudo’s stable, the Nakagawa stable, was closed due to a scandal caused by his stablemaster, so he transferred to Tokitsukaze stable. In his first tournament in the Makushita division after transferring stables, he secured a winning record on the 13th day, becoming the first 16-year-old to achieve a winning record in the Makushita division since Takanohana (the 65th Yokozuna).

In the lead up to the September tournament of the same year, Tokifudo injured the ligament in his right thumb but competed anyway, achieving a winning record. However, due to the effects of surgery he underwent after the tournament, he missed the following November tournament, and was demoted to Sandanme. He scored 6 wins and 1 loss, returning to the Makushita division in just one tournament.

In the July 2022 tournament, where he competed as East Makushita 38, Tokifudo won all 7 matches, winning the Makushita championship, his first championship in any division. In the September tournament, he rose to his highest rank of East Makushita 3, where a winning record would put him in contention for promotion to Sekitori, but he failed to achieve promotion.

In the January 2023 tournament, with a record of 2 wins and 3 losses, Tokifudo faced Otsuji in his sixth bout, their first match since the 2018 All-Japan Junior High School Individual Championships final. He grabbed his opponent's right arm with both hands and ultimately won with an arm twist. In the May 2024 tournament, where he entered the ring at the rank of West Makushita 7, he achieved his first winning record while ranked within the top 15 of the Makushita division.

Beginning in the May 2026 tournament, he changed his ring name to "Tokifudō" by combining "Toki" from the name of his stable and "Fudō" from the heya's motto of "unwavering resolve". In July of the same year, he achieved a record of 4 wins and 3 losses, and was promoted to Juryo for the following September tournament.

== Career record ==
Tokifudō Kō
| Year | January Hatsu basho, Tokyo | March Haru basho, Osaka | May Natsu basho, Tokyo | July Nagoya basho, Nagoya | September Aki basho, Tokyo | November Kyūshū basho, Fukuoka |
|---|---|---|---|---|---|---|
| 2019 | x | (Maezumō) | East Jonokuchi #14; 5–2 | West Jonidan #66; 6–1 | East Sandanme #96; 5–2 | East Sandanme #61; 5–2 |
| 2020 | East Sandanme #33; 4–3 | East Sandanme #19; 5–2 | West Makushita #54; Tournament Cancelled; State of Emergency; 0–0–0 | West Makushita #54; 4–3 | West Makushita #44; 4–3 | West Makushita #33; 4–3 |
| 2021 | East Makushita #26; 4–3 | East Makushita #21; 2–5 | West Makushita #37; 2–5 | West Makushita #60; 4–3 | West Makushita #51; 4–3 | West Makushita #40; Sat out due to injury 0–0–7 |
| 2022 | East Sandanme #21; 6–1 | West Makushita #42; 3–4 | West Makushita #47; 4–3 | East Makushita #38; 7–0; Champion | East Makushita #3; 2–5 | East Makushita #10; 3–4 |
| 2023 | West Makushita #15; 3–4 | East Makushita #19; 5–2 | East Makushita #12; 2–5 | East Makushita #31; 4–3 | East Makushita #25; 4–3 | East Makushita #19; 4–3 |
| 2024 | West Makushita #15; 3–4 | West Makushita #22; 6–1 | West Makushita #7; 5–2 | West Makushita #4; 2–5 | East Makushita #15; 4–3 | East Makushita #10; 3–4 |
| 2025 | West Makushita #18; 1–6 | West Makushita #41; 4–3 | West Makushita #33; 5–2 | East Makushita #18; 5–2 | West Makushita #8; 4–3 | West Makushita #6; 4–3 |
| 2026 | East Makushita #5; 3–4 | East Makushita #8; 4–3 | East Makushita #5; 4–3 | West Makushita #2; 4–3 | West Jūryō #13; 7–8 | West Jūryō #13; 9–6 |
Record given as wins–losses–absences Top division champion Top division runner-up Retired Non-participation Jūryō Lower divisions Sanshō key: F=Fighting spirit; O=Outstanding performance; T=Technique Also shown: ★=Kinboshi; P=Playoff(s); Divisions: Makuuchi — Jūryō — Makushita — Sandanme — Jonidan — Jonokuchi Makuuchi ranks: Yokozuna — Ōzeki — Sekiwake — Komusubi — Maegashira

== See also ==
- Glossary of sumo terms
- List of active sumo wrestlers
