= Kasugayama stable =

Defunct sumo stable

Coordinates: 35.5371°N 139.7400°E

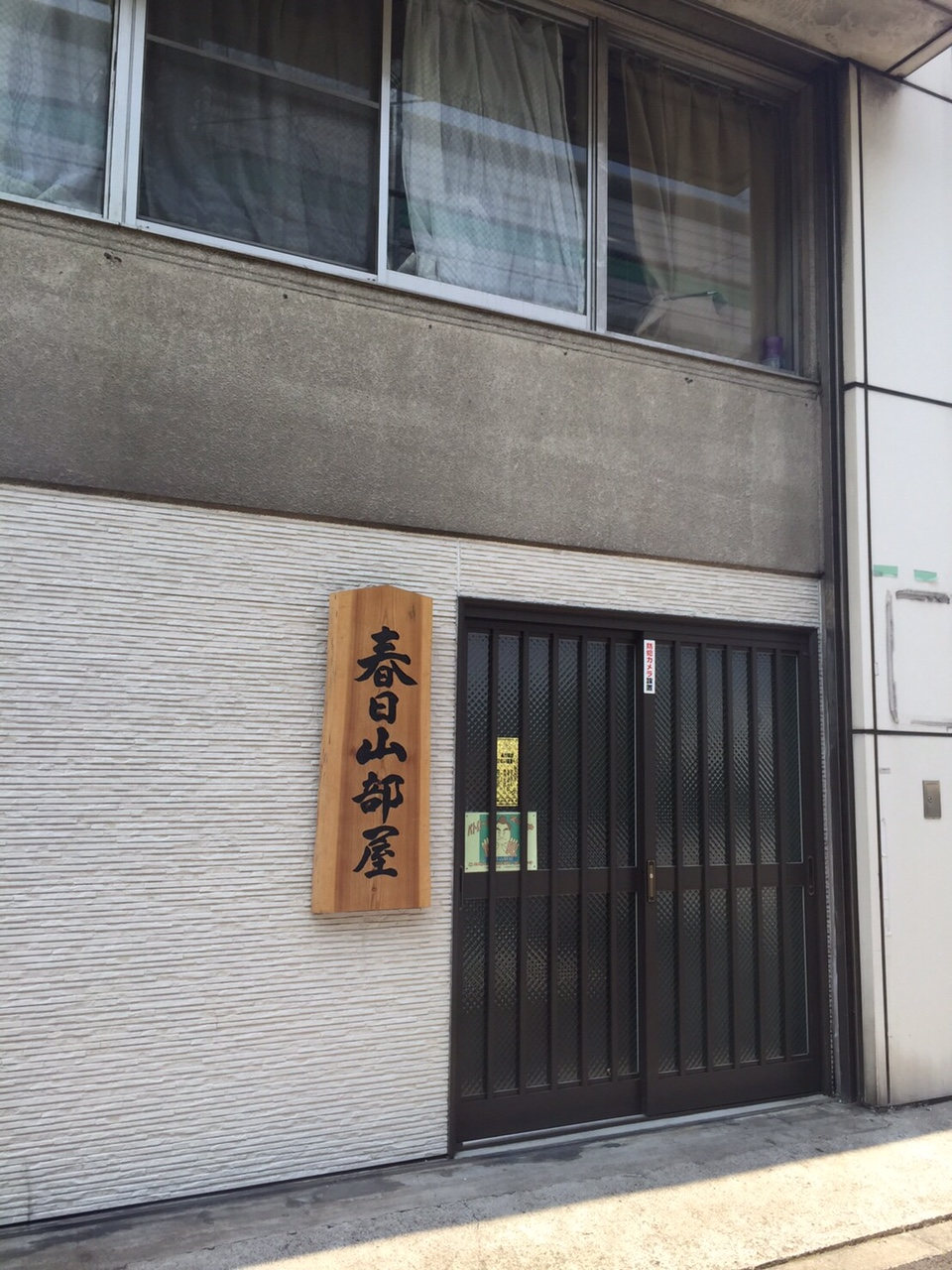
The new premises, May 2016

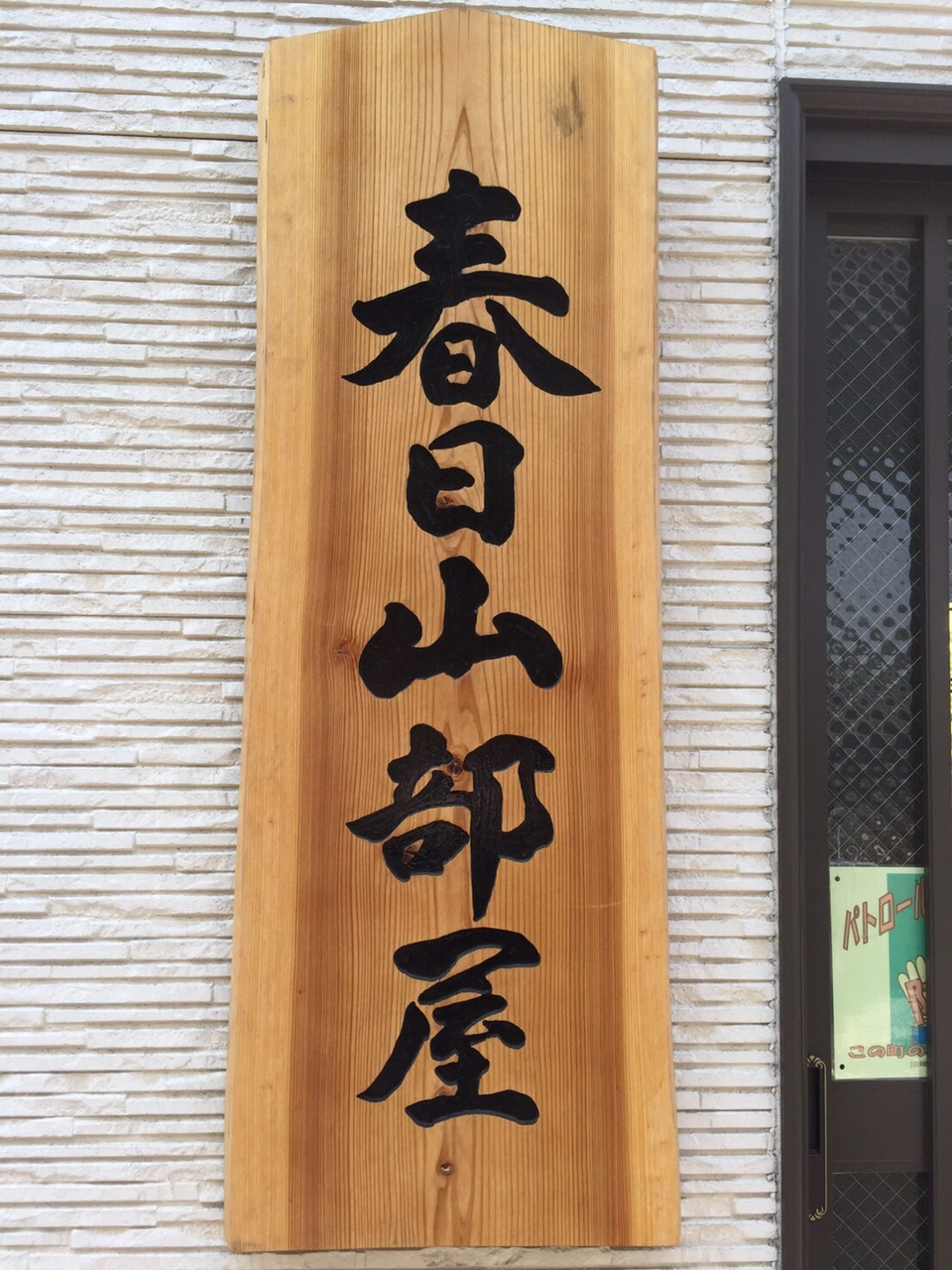

Kasugayama stable (春日山部屋, Kasugayama-beya) (1925–2016) was a sumo stable of the Isegahama group.

In its modern form it dates from 1954 when it was re-established by former ōzeki Nayoroiwa who led it until his death in 1971. It went out of existence in 1990 when the stablemaster, maegashira Ōnobori, reached the mandatory retirement age of sixty-five, and was absorbed by Ajigawa stable, but it was revived by Kasugafuji after his retirement as an active wrestler in 1996. As of January 2016 it had 23 wrestlers. Its only wrestler to reach the top division was the Korean born Kasugaō who retired in 2011.

In 2012 Kasugafuji stood down as head following his election to the Sumo Association's board of directors, handing over control to the former Hamanishiki of the affiliated Oitekaze stable, and remained at Kasugayama stable under the name elder name Ikazuchi. However he resigned from the Sumo Association in September of that year.

In 2013 the current and former heads of the stable sued each other, with the former Kasugafuji who still owned the deeds to the premises claiming unpaid rent and demanding eviction, while Hamanishiki claimed the Kasugayama myoseki certificate had not been handed over as promised. Two trials proceeded on the two separate issues. A settlement was reached on the rent issue in 2015 with Hamanishiki agreeing to move the stable to another location with the same ward of Kawasaki. In August 2016 the court ordered that Hamanishiki pay Kasugafuji 171.6 million yen for the certificate. Hamanishiki appealed this decision to the Tokyo High Court.

In October 2016 the Sumo Association ordered Kasugayama to resign as stablemaster of Kasugayama stable, and that it be absorbed into Oitekaze stable, because Kasugayama's lack of a myoseki certificate meant that he was not qualified to be a stablemaster. They also criticized him for not training or guiding his wrestlers at all during the September tournament, despite being told to after being removed as a judge in August. The closure went ahead despite the stable's koenkai, or supporter's group, sending a petition to the Sumo Association demanding the decision be reversed, and eleven of the stable's wrestlers refusing to move to Oitekaze and instead submitting their retirement papers in protest.

In January 2017 Hamanishiki resigned from the Sumo Association. In the same month it was announced that the stable would be revived under the name Nakagawa stable and run by Nakagawa (maegashira Asahisato) who had been looking after the remaining Kasugayama stable wrestlers within Oitekaze stable.

== Ring name conventions ==
Some wrestlers at this stable took ring names or shikona that include the characters 春日 (read: kasuga, which are the first two characters in the stable name, and which is also in deference to Kasugayama who reestablished the stable.

== Owners ==
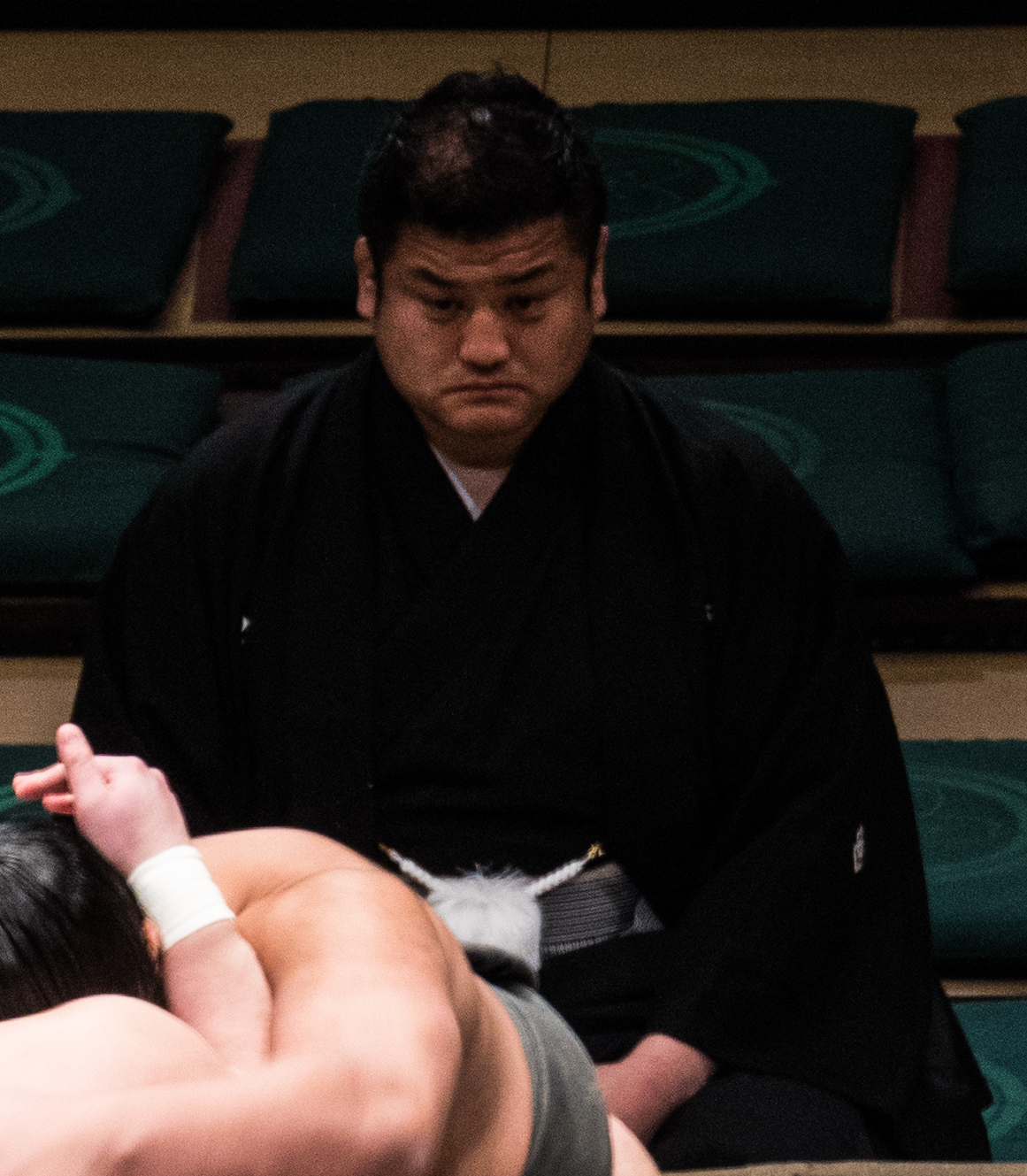
Hamanishiki

- 2012–2016: 21st Kasugayama Takamasa (toshiyori, maegashira 11, Hamanishiki)
- 1997–2012: 20th Kasugayama Yoshiaki (maegashira 1, Kasugafuji)
- 1991–1996: defunct
- 1971–1990: 16th Kasugayama Takahiro (maegashira 1, Ōnobori) (Note: Rented owners' bond; Ōnobori succeeded Kasuganobeya after returning the bond of toshiyori, or toshiyori myōseki (in Japanese) as the 12th Urakaze (in Japanese) (March 1965-February 1971).)
- 1954–1971: 15th Kasugayama Shizuo (ōzeki, Nayori'iwa)
- 1925–1954: 14th Kasugayama Masahiro (sekiwake, Fujinokawa)

== Coaches ==
- Takashima Daizō (iin, sekiwake Kōbōyama)

== Notable former members ==
- Ōnobori, during 14th and 15th owners (maegashira 1st)
- Byakuhōyama 白法山旺三 (Byakuhōyama Ōzō) (in Japanese), during 15th and 16th owners (sekitori, or Jūryō 7th)
- Tenkōyama 天凰山豊 (Tenkōyama Yutaka) (in Japanese), during 16th owner (Jūryō 13th)
- Kasugafuji, during 16th owner (maegashira 1st)
- Kasugaō, during 20th owner (maegashira 3rd)

== Assistant ==
- Byakuhōyama (sewanin, makushita, real name Fumio Izawa)

== Referee ==
- Shikimori Yodayū (makuuchi gyōji, real name Hiroshi Kikuchi)

== Usher ==
- Kōhei (sandanme yobidashi, real name Kōhei Ōyama)

== Hairdressers ==
- Tokojin (first class tokoyama)
- Tokoharu (fourth class tokoyama)

== See also ==
- List of sumo stables
- List of sumo elders
- List of active sumo wrestlers
- List of past sumo wrestlers
- List of years in sumo
- Glossary of sumo terms
