= Asahisato Kenji =

Japanese sumo wrestler

Personal information
- Native name: 旭里 憲治
- Born: Kenji Masuda; 9 November 1965 (age 60) Ikeda, Osaka, Japan
- Height: 1.86 m (6 ft 1 in)
- Weight: 125 kg (276 lb)

Sport
- Sport: Sumo
- Retired: January 1998
- Heya: Ōshima -> Nakagawa
- Record: 553-543-3
- Debut: March 1981
- Highest rank: Maegashira 14 (March 1990)
- Elder name: Nakagawa
- Championships: 1 (Makushita); 1 (Jonidan)
- Updated on Sep. 2012

Asahisato Kenji (born 9 November 1965 as Kenji Masuda) is a former sumo wrestler from Ikeda, Osaka, Japan. His sumo career spanned 17 years where he competed in 102 tournaments from 1981 until 1998. His highest rank was maegashira 14. Upon his retirement he became an elder of the Japan Sumo Association. He took charge of Nakagawa stable in January 2017 and ran it until July 2020. After he was found to have mistreated wrestlers in the stable, he was demoted two rungs in the Sumo Association's hierarchy.

== Career ==
He played baseball in elementary school and was a member of the judo club from his second year of junior high school. He joined Oshima stable upon his graduation from junior high, making his professional debut in March 1981. Struggling for a while, he would win the fifth-division championship in September 1982, despite losing the initial bout of a three-way playoff. He began as Asahisato but from 1983 to 1987 was known as Kyokutenyu before reverting to his original shikona. He became the first new sekitori of the Heisei period when he was promoted to the juryo division in January 1989. He reached the top makuuchi division in March 1990. In his debut tournament in makuuchi he had seven wins and seven losses coming into the final day but lost to Oginohana who was also on 7–7 and got demoted back to juryo. He reached the top division three more times, but in each case had make-koshi, or a losing record and he was not able to climb higher than the rank of maegashira 14 which he had first made in his debut top division tournament. He fell back to the makushita division for three tournaments from November 1994 to March 1995 but returned to the paid ranks after winning the makushita division championship with a perfect 7–0 record. He was demoted to makushita again for three tournaments in 1997 but again got promoted back. Overall, he fought 1095 career matches across 102 tournaments, with 553 wins, 543 losses and just three absences due to injury. He spent a total of 53 tournaments as a sekitori, 49 in juryo and four in makuuchi.

== Retirement from sumo ==
He retired in January 1998 and became an elder in the Japan Sumo Association under the name Kumagatani, although this kabu was borrowed from the former maegashira Yoshinomine who had retired from the Sumo Association two years before upon reaching 65 years of age. In 2004 he switched to the Nakagawa kabu after the takeover of Miyagino stable by the former Kanechika meant the Kumegatani kabu was needed by the former Chikubayama. Asahisato transferred to Oitekaze stable where he continued to work as a coach. In January 2017 he branched out from Oitekaze stable to become head coach of the Nakagawa stable, which is composed of wrestlers previously from the closed Kasugayama stable which had merged with Oitekaze when its previous head coach, former maegashira Hamanishiki, was forced to step down.

In July 2020 Nakagawa stable was closed down by the Sumo Association after three wrestlers complained of verbal and physical abuse. Nakagawa was allowed to stay as an elder but was demoted two rungs in the Sumo Association's hierarchy to plain toshiyori status. He was transferred to Tokitsukaze stable with his wrestlers being dispersed among several different stables. Nakagawa apologized to the other stablemasters present at the disciplinary meeting, saying "I didn’t know that my disciples took my words and deeds as (abuse)." He escaped outright dismissal as the wrestlers were not injured and were not seeking further punishment.

== Fighting style ==
Asahisato was a yotsu-sumo wrestler who preferring grappling techniques to pushing or thrusting. When grabbing the mawashi or belt he used a migi-yotsu (left hand outside, right hand inside) position. He regularly used his left hand outside grip to win by uwatenage or overarm throw.

== Career record ==
Asahisato Kenji
Year	January Hatsu basho, Tokyo	March Haru basho, Osaka	May Natsu basho, Tokyo	July Nagoya basho, Nagoya	September Aki basho, Tokyo	November Kyūshū basho, Fukuoka
1981	x	(Maezumo)	West Jonokuchi #35; 4–3	East Jonidan #134; 5–2	West Jonidan #88; 2–5	East Jonidan #110; 4–3
1982	East Jonidan #88; 3–4	West Jonidan #109; 6–1	East Jonidan #39; 4–3	East Jonidan #23; 2–5	West Jonidan #51; 7–0–PPP; Champion	East Sandanme #52; 2–5
1983	West Sandanme #75; 2–5	East Jonidan #13; 3–4	East Jonidan #33; 4–3	West Jonidan #20; 6–1	East Sandanme #53; 4–3	West Sandanme #39; 5–2
1984	East Sandanme #11; 2–5	East Sandanme #37; 2–5	West Sandanme #5; 5–2	West Makushita #39; 2–5	East Sandanme #8; 5–2	West Makushita #41; 3–4
1985	East Makushita #55; 5–2	East Makushita #34; 2–5	West Makushita #58; 5–2	East Makushita #37; 5–2	East Makushita #21; 4–3	West Makushita #16; 3–4
1986	West Makushita #25; 2–5	East Makushita #48; 5–2	East Makushita #30; 2–5	West Makushita #60; 4–3	East Makushita #46; 4–3	East Makushita #38; 4–3
1987	East Makushita #31; 1–6	East Sandanme #2; 4–3	West Makushita #50; 3–4	West Sandanme #2; 4–3	West Makushita #46; 5–2	East Makushita #28; 5–2
1988	East Makushita #14; 4–3	West Makushita #7; 2–5	West Makushita #21; 5–2	West Makushita #12; 4–3	West Makushita #7; 4–3	East Makushita #3; 5–2
1989	West Jūryō #13; 9–6	West Jūryō #9; 8–7	East Jūryō #6; 6–9	East Jūryō #11; 9–6	West Jūryō #7; 9–6	East Jūryō #4; 9–6
1990	East Jūryō #1; 8–7	West Maegashira #14; 7–8	East Jūryō #1; 9–6	East Maegashira #14; 3–12	West Jūryō #8; 9–6	West Jūryō #2; 5–10
1991	East Jūryō #7; 9–6	West Jūryō #2; 8–7	West Jūryō #1; 6–9	West Jūryō #5; 8–7	West Jūryō #3; 5–7–3	East Jūryō #8; 6–9
1992	East Jūryō #12; 9–6	West Jūryō #7; 8–7	West Jūryō #5; 8–7	East Jūryō #3; 8–7	East Maegashira #16; 6–9	West Jūryō #2; 5–10
1993	West Jūryō #7; 8–7	West Jūryō #3; 7–8	East Jūryō #5; 8–7	East Jūryō #4; 8–7	East Jūryō #3; 8–7	West Jūryō #2; 8–7
1994	East Jūryō #2; 9–6	East Jūryō #1; 8–7	East Maegashira #16; 5–10	West Jūryō #4; 4–11	East Jūryō #12; 2–13	West Makushita #9; 2–5
1995	East Makushita #25; 5–2	West Makushita #14; 7–0; Champion	East Jūryō #13; 9–6	East Jūryō #9; 8–7	East Jūryō #8; 6–9	East Jūryō #11; 9–6
1996	West Jūryō #6; 8–7	West Jūryō #5; 6–9	West Jūryō #8; 7–8	West Jūryō #11; 9–6	West Jūryō #5; 7–8	West Jūryō #7; 1–14
1997	West Makushita #10; 4–3	West Makushita #6; 4–3	West Makushita #3; 5–2	West Jūryō #12; 10–5	East Jūryō #5; 4–11	East Jūryō #10; 9–6
1998	West Jūryō #4; Retired; 5–10	x	x	x	x	x
Record given as wins–losses–absences Top division champion Top division runner-up Retired Lower divisions Non-participation Sanshō key: F=Fighting spirit; O=Outstanding performance; T=Technique Also shown: ★=Kinboshi; P=Playoff(s); Divisions: Makuuchi — Jūryō — Makushita — Sandanme — Jonidan — Jonokuchi Makuuchi ranks: Yokozuna — Ōzeki — Sekiwake — Komusubi — Maegashira

== See also ==
- Glossary of sumo terms
- List of past sumo wrestlers
- List of sumo elders
