= Kasugaō Katsumasa =

South Korean sumo (born 1977)

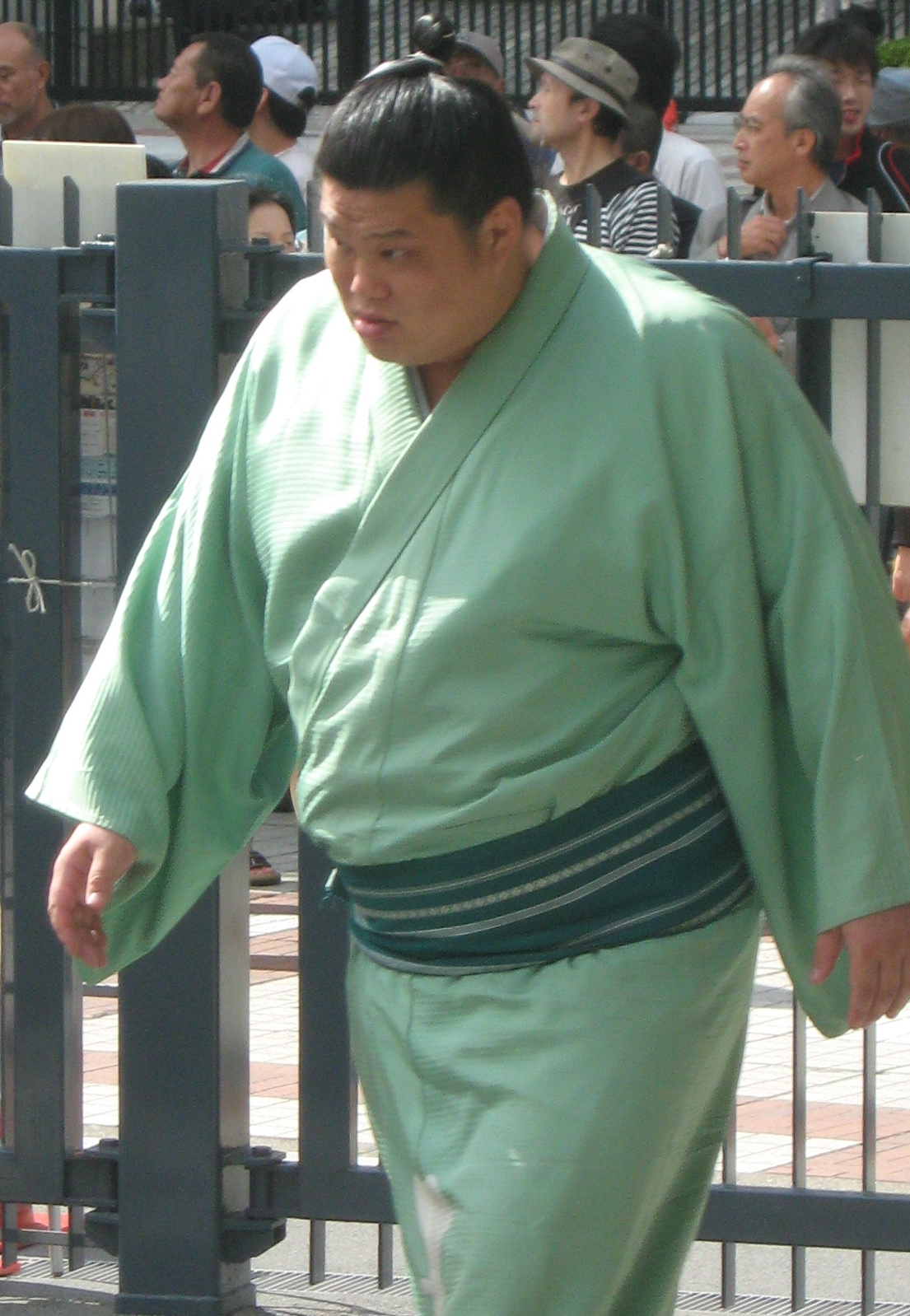
- Katsumasa in 2008

Personal information
- Native name: 春日王 克昌
- Born: Kim Seong Taek; July 1, 1977 (age 49) Incheon, South Korea
- Height: 1.83 m (6 ft 0 in)
- Weight: 154 kg (340 lb; 24.3 st)

Sport
- Sport: Sumo
- Retired: April, 2011
- Heya: Kasugayama
- Record: 464-452-11
- Debut: November, 1998
- Highest rank: Maegashira 3 (March, 2007)
- Championships: 2 (Jūryō); 1 (Makushita)
- Special Prizes: Fighting Spirit (1)
- Updated on Jan 2011

- Kasugaō Katsumasa
- Hangul: 김성택
- Hanja: 金成澤
- RR: Gim Seongtaek
- MR: Kim Sŏngt'aek

Kasugaō Katsumasa (春日王 克昌, born 1 July 1977, as Kim Seong Taek) is a former sumo wrestler from Incheon, South Korea. He was the first sumo wrestler to reach the top makuuchi division officially representing South Korea. (Several other top wrestlers in the past have hid a Korean or half-Korean background). He joined sumo in 1998, making the top division for the first time in 2003. His highest rank was maegashira 3. In September 2009, he acquired Japanese citizenship. In April 2011 he was ordered to retire by the Japan Sumo Association after an investigation found him guilty of match-fixing.

== Early life and sumo background ==
His father died when he was just three years old and his mother brought the family up alone, working days and nights as a cleaner. He went to Bupyeong High School, as did South Korean footballer Kim Nam-Il, and they remain very close friends. After winning a national Ssireum competition in 1998, he was invited by the stablemaster of the recently opened Kasugayama stable to come to Japan. He saw the opportunity to support his family back in Korea, and took a leave of absence from his university.

== Career ==
He made his professional debut in November 1998. For his first couple of tournaments he fought under the shikona of Kimu, but this was soon changed to Kasugaō, the name adapted from both his stable and his stablemaster's old fighting name of Kasugafuji.

Kasugaō reached the jūryō division in July 2002 and the top makuuchi division just three tournaments later in January 2003, after winning the second division championship in November 2002 by defeating Asasekiryū on the last day. On the same day Asashōryū won the makuuchi division title, making it the first time that two foreign born wrestlers had won the top two divisions in the same tournament. Kasugaō sent all his prize money of two million yen home to his mother.

In his top division debut Kasugaō scored an impressive ten wins and was awarded the Fighting Spirit Prize. He progressed to maegashira 6 but then a series of poor results sent him back down to the jūryō division. In 2004 the Japan Sumo Association organized a tour of Seoul, and even though he had fallen to jūryō Kasugaō was still highly sought after by the Korean sumo fans.

After moving between the top two divisions a couple of times he won promotion back to makuuchi in September 2005 and reached his highest rank of maegashira 3 in March 2007. He was forced to withdraw from the May 2008 tournament with only three wins, after suffering a knee injury on the 8th day, which resulted in demotion back to the jūryō division. He also missed out on an exhibition tour of Los Angeles in June. He scored nine wins in the July 2008 tournament, returning him to the top division for September, but he could only turn in a disastrous 2-13 there, and was demoted to jūryō once again. After four tournaments away, he returned to makuuchi for the July 2009 tournament and came through with a winning record. He applied for Japanese citizenship in June 2009 and became a citizen three months later in September. A poor 3-12 score in November 2009 saw him demoted to jūryō again for the January 2010 tournament, but a 9-6 score was enough for an immediate re-promotion to the top division. On this occasion he lasted only one tournament before being demoted again, but he won promotion to makuuchi for the eighth time in September 2010 after another 9-6 in July. In January 2011 he took his second jūryō division championship, more than eight years after his first, with a 12-3 record and a play-off win over Tochinowaka.

== Retirement from sumo ==
After an investigation by the Sumo Association into allegations of bout-rigging prompted by the discovery of text-messages on a mobile phone belonging to former maegashira Kasuganishiki, Kasugaō was one of 23 wrestlers and coaches found guilty of involvement. He was ordered to retire, and submitted his letter of resignation on April 4, 2011. His danpatsu-shiki, or official retirement ceremony was held on May 28, 2011, with guests such as Hiroki Matsukata, Yoo Ji-tae and Choi Hong-man attending.

== Fighting style ==
Like many wrestlers, Kasugaō was fond of yotsu-sumo or grappling techniques, his most common winning move being yori-kiri or force out. His favourite grip on the mawashi was migi-yotsu, with his left hand outside and right hand inside his opponent's arms. However, he was also adept at throws, his next two most often used techniques being kote-nage, the armlock throw, and uwate-nage, the outer-arm throw.

== Career record ==
Kasugaō Katsumasa
Year	January Hatsu basho, Tokyo	March Haru basho, Osaka	May Natsu basho, Tokyo	July Nagoya basho, Nagoya	September Aki basho, Tokyo	November Kyūshū basho, Fukuoka
1998	x	x	x	x	x	(Maezumo)
1999	East Jonokuchi #41; 6–1	West Jonidan #89; 7–0–P	East Sandanme #80; 6–1	West Sandanme #27; 4–3	West Sandanme #13; 3–4	East Sandanme #28; 6–1
2000	East Makushita #51; 3–4	East Sandanme #5; 5–2	East Makushita #47; 3–4	East Sandanme #3; 5–2	East Makushita #43; 5–2	West Makushita #23; 4–3
2001	East Makushita #19; 4–3	East Makushita #13; 1–6	West Makushita #31; 5–2	East Makushita #18; 5–2	East Makushita #11; 4–3	West Makushita #8; 2–5
2002	West Makushita #19; 7–0; Champion	West Makushita #1; 3–4	West Makushita #4; 6–1	East Jūryō #12; 8–7	East Jūryō #9; 10–5	East Jūryō #6; 11–4; Champion
2003	West Maegashira #13; 10–5; F	East Maegashira #7; 8–7	East Maegashira #6; 4–11	West Maegashira #12; 4–11	West Jūryō #3; 4–9–2	West Jūryō #7; 9–6
2004	West Jūryō #2; 5–10	West Jūryō #6; 10–5	East Jūryō #2; 10–5	East Maegashira #13; 4–8–3	West Jūryō #1; 9–6	East Maegashira #15; 8–7
2005	East Maegashira #14; 9–6	East Maegashira #11; 1–14	East Jūryō #5; 7–8	West Jūryō #5; 10–5	East Maegashira #16; 7–8	East Maegashira #16; 8–7
2006	East Maegashira #12; 9–6	West Maegashira #7; 7–8	East Maegashira #8; 6–9	West Maegashira #11; 5–10	West Maegashira #15; 8–7	West Maegashira #7; 8–7
2007	East Maegashira #7; 8–7	West Maegashira #3; 5–10	West Maegashira #6; 5–10	East Maegashira #10; 7–8	West Maegashira #10; 10–5	West Maegashira #5; 4–11
2008	West Maegashira #11; 8–7	West Maegashira #9; 8–7	East Maegashira #9; 3–6–6	West Jūryō #2; 9–6	West Maegashira #15; 2–13	East Jūryō #7; 8–7
2009	West Jūryō #5; 8–7	East Jūryō #3; 7–8	East Jūryō #4; 10–5	West Maegashira #15; 8–7	West Maegashira #11; 6–9	East Maegashira #14; 3–12
2010	West Jūryō #4; 9–6	East Maegashira #16; 5–10	East Jūryō #3; 6–9	West Jūryō #5; 9–6	East Maegashira #13; 6–9	West Maegashira #15; 5–10
2011	East Jūryō #2; 12–3–P; Champion	Tournament Cancelled; 0–0–0	East Maegashira #10; Retired –	x	x	x
Record given as wins–losses–absences Top division champion Top division runner-up Retired Lower divisions Non-participation Sanshō key: F=Fighting spirit; O=Outstanding performance; T=Technique Also shown: ★=Kinboshi; P=Playoff(s); Divisions: Makuuchi — Jūryō — Makushita — Sandanme — Jonidan — Jonokuchi Makuuchi ranks: Yokozuna — Ōzeki — Sekiwake — Komusubi — Maegashira

== See also ==
- List of sumo tournament second division champions
- Glossary of sumo terms
- List of non-Japanese sumo wrestlers
- List of past sumo wrestlers
