= Nakagawa stable =

Defunct sumo stable

Nakagawa stable (中川部屋 Nakagawa-beya) (2017–2020) was a sumo stable of the Tokitsukaze group.

It was founded on January 26, 2017 with nine wrestlers, all of whom were previously members of Kasugayama stable. That stable closed in October 2017, with its wrestlers living temporarily in Oitekaze stable. One of Oitekaze's coaches, Nakagawa (maegashira Asahisato), agreed to become the head coach of the newly formed stable. He effectively replaced Kasugayama (maegashira Hamanishiki), who was forced to resign from the Japan Sumo Association on January 16, 2017, because of a legal dispute with the previous Kasugayama (maegashira Kasugafuji) which meant he was unable to obtain the necessary toshiyori-kabu certificate to remain a stablemaster. As of January 2020 the stable had nine wrestlers.

In July 2020 reports emerged that the Sumo Association's compliance committee was investigating complaints by wrestlers at the stable of power harassment leveled against Nakagawa-oyakata. On 13 July 2020 it was decided that the stable would close down, Nakagawa would be demoted two ranks in the Sumo Association's hierarchy, and to be moved to Tokitsukaze stable. The remaining wrestlers and personnel will be distributed to a further seven stables.

== Owner ==
- 2017–2020: 15th Nakagawa (iin, maegashira, Asahisato)

== Notable wrestlers ==
- Tanegashima, then ranked in makushita

== Referee ==
- Shikimori Yonokichi (makuuchi gyōji, real name Hiroshi Kikuchi)

== Usher ==
- Kōhei (makushita yobidashi, real name Oyama Kōhei)

== Hairdressers ==
- Tokojin (1st class Tokoyama)
- Tokoharu (3rd class tokoyama)

== Location and access ==
- 2-5-3 Otakawara, Kawasaki-ku, Kawasaki, Kanagawa Prefecture
- 3 minutes on foot from Sangyōdōro Station, Keikyū Daishi Line

== See also ==
- List of sumo stables
- List of sumo elders
- List of active sumo wrestlers
- List of past sumo wrestlers
- List of years in sumo
- Glossary of sumo terms
