= Hamanishiki Tatsurō =

Sumo wrestler

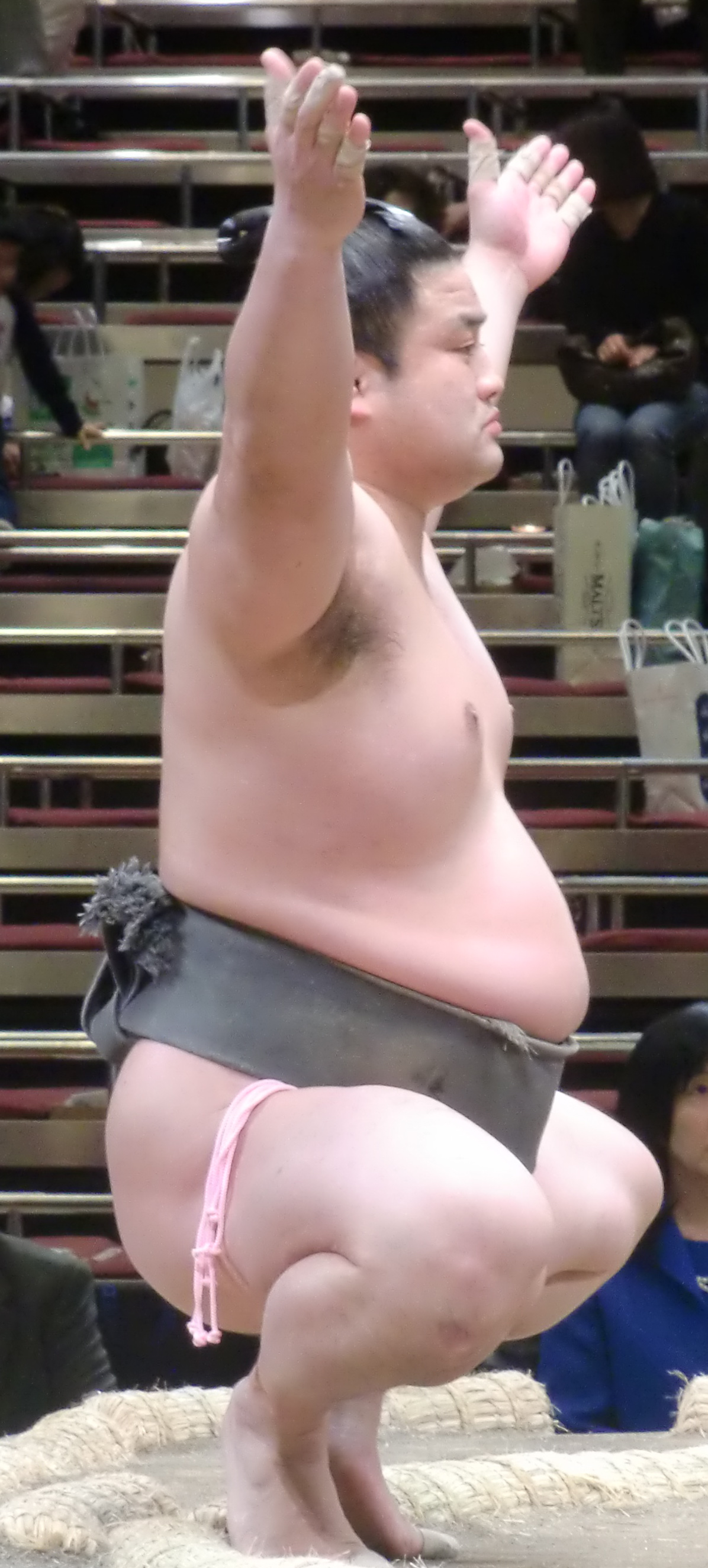

Personal information
- Native name: 濵錦 竜郎
- Born: Tatsurō Takahama; November 23, 1976 (age 49) Kumamoto, Japan
- Height: 1.82 m (5 ft 11 1/2 in)
- Weight: 127.5 kg (281 lb)

Sport
- Sport: Sumo
- Retired: March, 2012
- Heya: Oitekaze
- Record: 360-365-30
- Debut: March 1999
- Highest rank: Maegashira 11 (March, 2002)
- Updated on Feb 2012

Hamanishiki Tatsurō (born November 23, 1976, as Tatsurō Takahama) is a former sumo wrestler from Kumamoto, Japan. A former amateur champion, he made his professional debut in 1999. His highest rank was maegashira 11, which he reached in 2002. He was mostly ranked in the makushita and sandanme divisions from 2005 until his retirement in 2012. He became an elder of the Japan Sumo Association upon his retirement and was the head coach of the Kasugayama stable from 2012 until 2016.

== Career ==
Takahama practised amateur sumo at Nihon University and joined the professional sport in March 1999. He made his debut alongside Kotomitsuki and Takamisakari. He began wrestling under his own name but upon promotion to the second highest jūryō division in July 2000 he adopted the shikona or fighting name of Hamanishiki.

After five tournaments in jūryō he made his debut in the top makuuchi division in May 2001. A disastrous 4–11 meant immediate demotion, but was followed up by a nearly missed second-division championship, losing only in the final bout of an eight-way playoff. In the next tournaments however, he was unable to progress higher than the lower maegashira ranks and fell back to the second division in September 2002 yet again. In November 2004, ranked at the very bottom of jūryō, he produced an abysmal 1–14 record and was demoted to the third makushita division, where he had begun his career. He reverted to his own surname in November 2005 but this did little to change his fortunes. He missed two tournaments through injury in November 2006 and January 2007 and was demoted once more, to the fourth sandanme division.

He managed to return to the makushita division after a good 6–1 performance in January 2008, and he followed up with a 5–2 score in March and 4–3 in May, which took him to makushita 26 for the July 2008 tournament, his highest rank since September 2006, before his injury. He returned to the Hamanishiki name in July 2009.

In May 2011 he earned promotion back to the jūryō division for the first time in over six years after scoring 6–1 at makushita 10. There were a large number of positions available in jūryō due to the forced retirements of several wrestlers after a match-fixing scandal. The 39 tournaments it took him to return to jūryō is the most in sumo history. His stay in jūryō lasted only two tournaments however, as he could score only 5–10 in July and 2–13 in September.

== Retirement from sumo ==
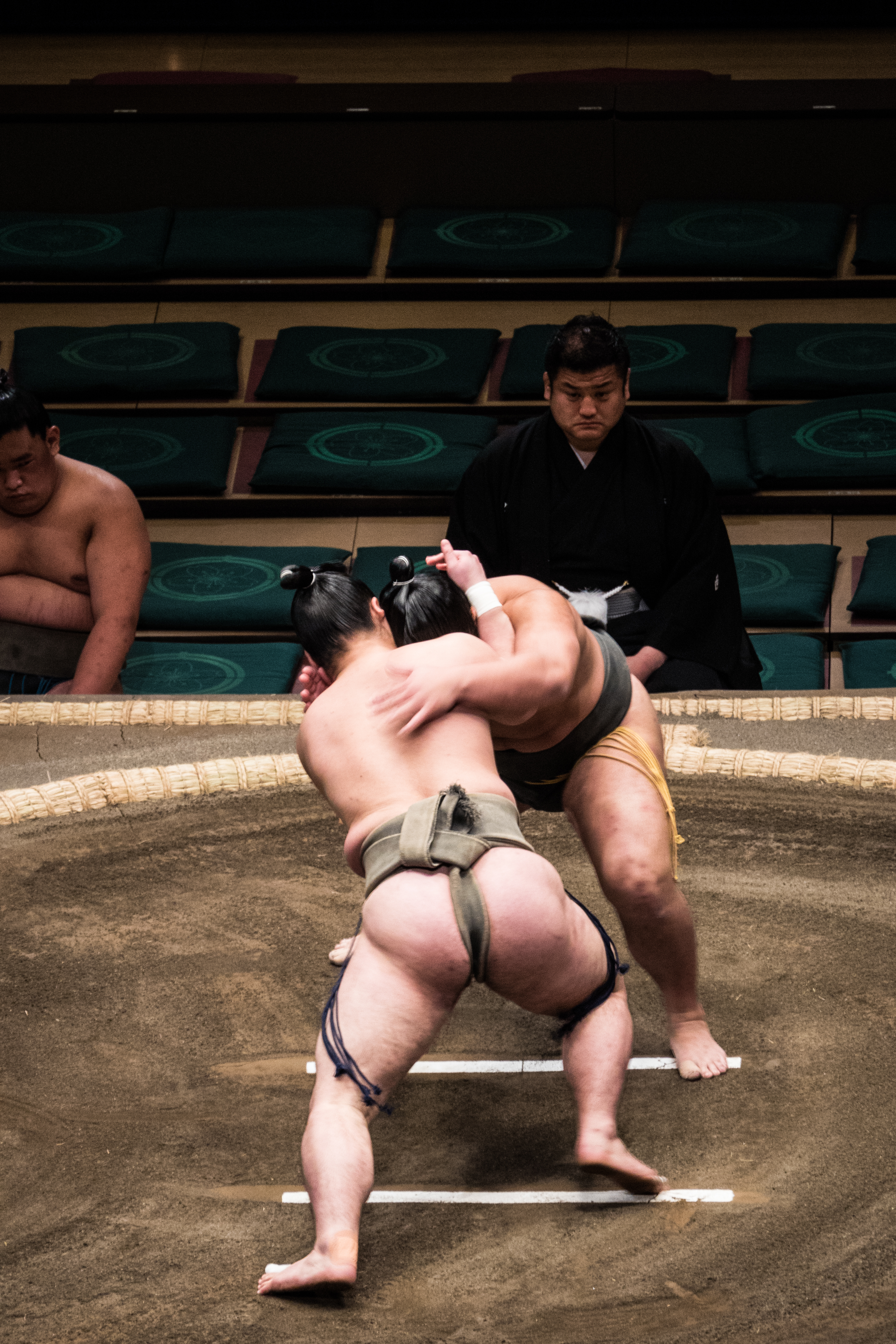
As a ringside judge in May 2016

He retired in February 2012 and took charge of the Kasugayama stable as the previous head, former maegashira Kasugafuji, concentrated on his role as a director of the Sumo Association's board. After a legal dispute with the former Kasugafuji, who subsequently left the Sumo Association and claimed rent had not been paid to him, Hamanishiki moved the stable to a new location in Kawasaki city. Continuing legal disputes with the former head of the stable meant that he had not been given the official certificate granting him ownership of the Kasugayama elder stock, and thus was not qualified to be a stablemaster. In October 2016 the Sumo Association ordered him to resign as stablemaster, and move his wrestlers to Oitekaze stable. Kasugayama did so, but he left the Sumo Association altogether in January 2017, having failed to meet their deadline to come to an agreement with his predecessor. His lawsuit was settled at the Tokyo High Court the following month.

== Fighting style ==
Hamanishiki was a yotsu-sumo wrestler, who preferred grappling techniques to pushing or thrusting. His most common winning kimarite was a straightforward yori-kiri or force out. His favourite grip on his opponent's mawashi was migi-yotsu, a left hand outside, right hand inside position.

== Career record ==
Hamanishiki Tatsurō
Year	January Hatsu basho, Tokyo	March Haru basho, Osaka	May Natsu basho, Tokyo	July Nagoya basho, Nagoya	September Aki basho, Tokyo	November Kyūshū basho, Fukuoka
1999	x	Makushita tsukedashi #60; 4–3	East Makushita #51; 6–1	West Makushita #24; 6–1	East Makushita #8; 3–4	West Makushita #14; 4–3
2000	East Makushita #11; 4–3	East Makushita #8; 4–3	East Makushita #5; 5–2	East Jūryō #13; 10–5	West Jūryō #4; 5–10	East Jūryō #8; 7–8
2001	East Jūryō #10; 10–5	East Jūryō #2; 9–6	West Maegashira #12; 4–11	East Jūryō #3; 9–6–PPP	West Maegashira #14; 8–7	East Maegashira #12; 7–8
2002	West Maegashira #13; 8–7	East Maegashira #11; 7–8	East Maegashira #12; 6–9	Maegashira #14; 4–11	West Jūryō #7; 8–7	East Jūryō #7; 9–6
2003	West Jūryō #5; 5–10	East Jūryō #9; 10–5–P	East Jūryō #4; 6–9	East Jūryō #7; 2–3–10	West Makushita #6; 0–0–7	West Makushita #6; 4–3
2004	East Jūryō #13; 8–7	East Jūryō #10; 7–8	East Jūryō #11; 9–6	West Jūryō #5; 5–10	East Jūryō #11; 6–9	West Jūryō #14; 1–14
2005	West Makushita #12; 4–3	East Makushita #11; 5–2	West Makushita #5; 2–5	East Makushita #15; 3–4	East Makushita #21; 3–4	East Makushita #27; 2–5
2006	West Makushita #41; 5–2	East Makushita #28; 5–2	East Makushita #19; 4–3	West Makushita #14; 3–4	East Makushita #19; 3–4	East Makushita #28; 0–0–7
2007	West Sandanme #8; 0–1–6	West Sandanme #68; 4–3	East Sandanme #52; 4–3	East Sandanme #36; 4–3	West Sandanme #21; 3–4	West Sandanme #38; 4–3
2008	East Sandanme #23; 6–1	East Makushita #45; 5–2	East Makushita #30; 4–3	East Makushita #26; 3–4	East Makushita #34; 5–2	West Makushita #17; 3–4
2009	East Makushita #26; 4–3	East Makushita #19; 3–4	East Makushita #28; 2–5	East Makushita #46; 5–2	East Makushita #34; 4–3	West Makushita #28; 2–5
2010	East Makushita #44; 4–3	East Makushita #38; 5–2	West Makushita #23; 3–4	West Makushita #31; 5–2	West Makushita #15; 3–4	West Makushita #19; 4–3
2011	East Makushita #15; 4–3	Tournament Cancelled; 0–0–0	West Makushita #10; 6–1	East Jūryō #9; 5–10	East Jūryō #14; 2–13	East Makushita #10; 2–5
2012	East Makushita #20; 3–4	West Makushita #26; Retired –	x	x	x	x
Record given as wins–losses–absences Top division champion Top division runner-up Retired Lower divisions Non-participation Sanshō key: F=Fighting spirit; O=Outstanding performance; T=Technique Also shown: ★=Kinboshi; P=Playoff(s); Divisions: Makuuchi — Jūryō — Makushita — Sandanme — Jonidan — Jonokuchi Makuuchi ranks: Yokozuna — Ōzeki — Sekiwake — Komusubi — Maegashira

== See also ==
- Glossary of sumo terms
- List of past sumo wrestlers
