= Ōnobori Mitsuhiro =

Japanese sumo wrestler (1925–2009)

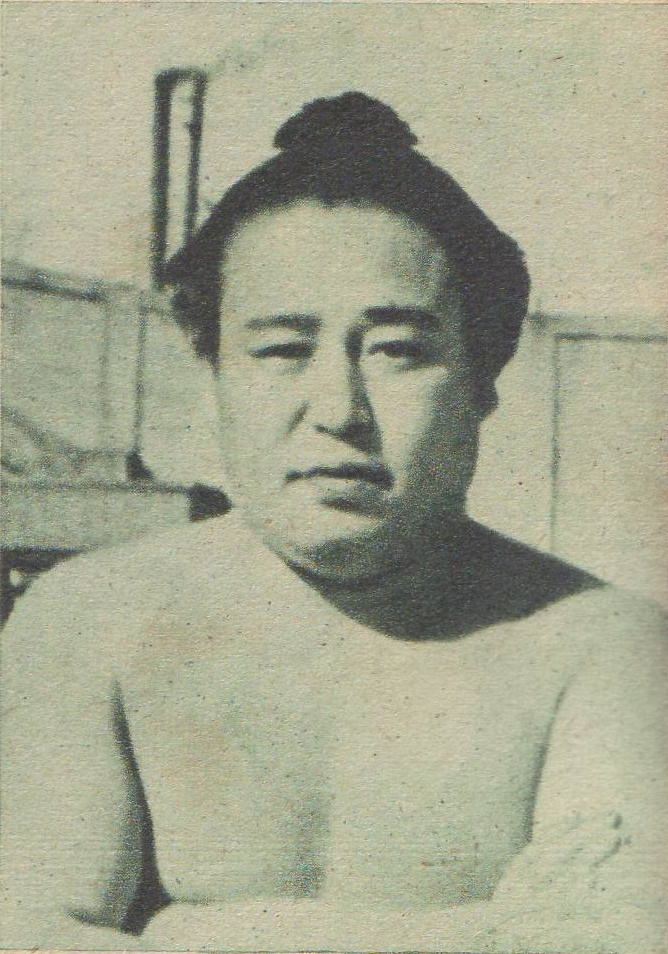

Personal information
- Born: Isamu Ishida; August 1, 1925 Karuizawa, Nagano, Japan
- Died: March 1, 2009 (aged 83)
- Height: 185 cm (6 ft 1 in)
- Weight: 116 kg (256 lb; 18 st 4 lb)

Sport
- Sport: Sumo
- Retired: January 1957
- Heya: Kasugayama
- Record: 235-233-20
- Debut: January 1941
- Highest rank: Maegashira 1 (March 1955)
- Championships: 1 (Jūryō); 1 (Makushita)
- Special Prizes: 1 (Fighting Spirit)
- Gold Stars: 1 Tochinishiki

Ōnobori Mitsuhiro (born Isamu Ishida, August 1, 1925 – March 1, 2009) was a sumo wrestler and coach from Karuizawa, Nagano, Japan. He made his professional debut in January 1941, reaching a highest rank of maegashira 1. He retired in 1957. From 1971 to 1990 he was the head coach of Kasugayama stable.

== Career ==
He joined Kasugayama stable in 1941, recruited by the 14th Kasugayama Oyakata, ex-sekiwake Fujinokawa. However the stable shut down in 1947 and he was transferred to Tatsunami stable. In 1955 the stable was revived by ex-ozeki Nayoroiwa and he once again became a member of Kasugayama stable. He reached the top makuuchi division in 1951 and in just his second tournament in the division he had his greatest success, finishing runner-up to Chiyonoyama in May 1951 with a 12–3 record and winning the Fighting Spirit prize. In January 1955 he defeated yokozuna Tochinishiki to earn his only kinboshi, or gold star. Although he scored ten wins against five losses from maegashira 5 in this tournament, there was no sanyaku position open for him and he was ranked at maegashira 1 on the banzuke in the following tournament in March 1955. He scored only two wins against thirteen losses, and this was to be his highest rank. After 21 top division tournaments he was demoted to the juryo division after the May 1956 tournament. He did not compete on the dohyo again, officially retiring in January 1957.

== Retirement from sumo ==
Onobori remained in sumo as an elder of the Japan Sumo Association, working as a coach at his old stable under a variety of elder names. In January 1971 he became head coach of Kasugayama stable following the death of ex-Nayoroiwa. He raised Kasugafuji, who also reached the rank of maegashira 1. Onobori was a director of the Sumo Association for four years from 1982, and an auditor from 1986. One of his nieces married Asahifuji in 1988. He reached the mandatory retirement age of 65 in 1990, and Kasugayama stable was wound up and absorbed into Ajigawa stable (although it was later revived by Kasugafuji upon his own retirement). Onobori died in Tokyo in March 2009 at the age of 83, from pneumonia.

== Pre-modern career record ==
- The New Year tournament began and the Spring tournament returned to Osaka in 1953.

Ōnobori Mitsuhiro
-	Spring Haru basho, Tokyo	Summer Natsu basho, Tokyo	Autumn Aki basho, Tokyo
1941	(Maezumo)	(Maezumo)	Not held
1942	West Jonokuchi #28; 5–3	East Jonidan #41; 4–4	Not held
1943	East Jonidan #22; 3–5	West Jonidan #25; 5–3	Not held
1944	West Sandanme #47; 4–4	East Sandanme #35; 2–3	West Sandanme #45; 3–2
1945	Not held	West Sandanme #13; 0–0–5	West Sandanme #14; 3–2
1946	Not held	Not held	East Makushita #25; 3–4
1947	Not held	West Makushita #32; 5–0	West Makushita #3; 2–4
1948	Not held	West Makushita #8; 2–2–2	West Makushita #10; 5–1; Champion
1949	East Jūryō #14; 7–6	West Jūryō #7; 11–4; Champion	East Jūryō #1; 7–8
1950	West Jūryō #2; 6–9	East Jūryō #4; 8–7	West Jūryō #3; 12–3
1951	East Maegashira #16; 8–7	East Maegashira #14; 12–3; F	West Maegashira #2; 7–8
1952	West Maegashira #3; 6–9	West Maegashira #5; 6–9	East Maegashira #8; Sat out due to injury 0–0–15
Record given as wins–losses–absences Top division champion Top division runner-up Retired Lower divisions Non-participation Sanshō key: F=Fighting spirit; O=Outstanding performance; T=Technique Also shown: ★=Kinboshi; P=Playoff(s); Divisions: Makuuchi — Jūryō — Makushita — Sandanme — Jonidan — Jonokuchi Makuuchi ranks: Yokozuna — Ōzeki — Sekiwake — Komusubi — Maegashira

-	New Year Hatsu basho, Tokyo	Spring Haru basho, Osaka	Summer Natsu basho, Tokyo	Autumn Aki basho, Tokyo
1953	East Maegashira #18; 10–5	East Maegashira #12; 6–9	West Maegashira #16; 8–7	East Maegashira #14; 10–5
1954	West Maegashira #6; 6–9	East Maegashira #10; 8–7	West Maegashira #7; 7–8	East Maegashira #8; 9–6
1955	West Maegashira #5; 10–5 ★	West Maegashira #1; 2–13	West Maegashira #8; 9–6	East Maegashira #4; 4–11
1956	East Maegashira #9; 5–10	West Maegashira #13; 4–11	West Maegashira #19; 1–11–3	West Jūryō #9; Sat out due to injury 0–0–0
1957	West Jūryō #22; Retired; 0–0–0	x	x	x
Record given as wins–losses–absences Top division champion Top division runner-up Retired Lower divisions Non-participation Sanshō key: F=Fighting spirit; O=Outstanding performance; T=Technique Also shown: ★=Kinboshi; P=Playoff(s); Divisions: Makuuchi — Jūryō — Makushita — Sandanme — Jonidan — Jonokuchi Makuuchi ranks: Yokozuna — Ōzeki — Sekiwake — Komusubi — Maegashira

== See also ==
- List of past sumo wrestlers
- List of sumo second division tournament champions
