= Nayoroiwa Shizuo =

Japanese sumo wrestler (1914–1971)

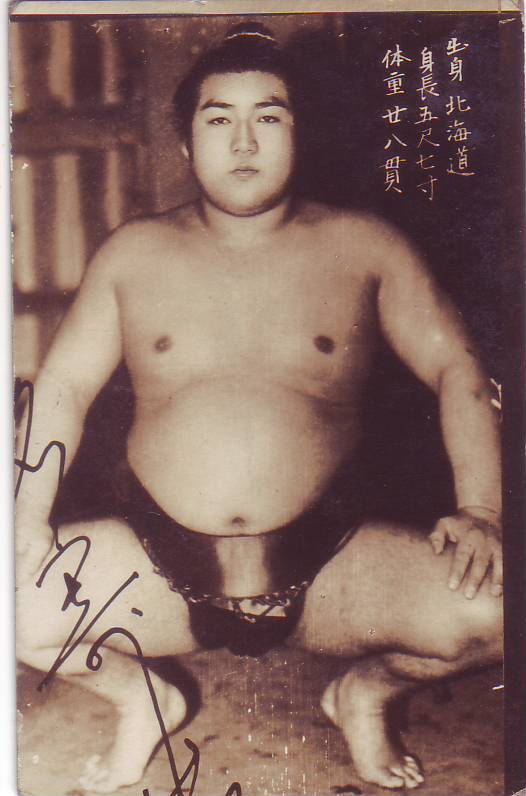

Personal information
- Native name: 名寄岩 静男
- Born: Shizuo Iwakabe; September 27, 1914 Nayoro, Hokkaidō, Japan
- Died: January 26, 1971 (aged 56)
- Height: 1.73 m (5 ft 8 in)
- Weight: 128 kg (282 lb)

Sport
- Sport: Sumo
- Retired: October, 1954
- Heya: Tatsunami
- Record: 337-297-33
- Debut: May, 1932
- Highest rank: Ōzeki (January, 1943)
- Elder name: Kasugayama
- Championships: 1 (Makushita); 1 (Sandanme)
- Special Prizes: Fighting Spirit (2)
- Gold Stars: 2 Musashiyama; Chiyonoyama
- Updated on June 2020

Nayoroiwa Shizuo (名寄岩静男, September 27, 1914 – January 26, 1971) was a Japanese sumo wrestler from Nayoro, Hokkaidō, Japan.

== Career ==
He joined Tatsunami stable and made his professional debut in May 1932. Along with his stablemates Futabayama and Haguroyama, he supported Tatsunami stable. In January 1937, he was promoted to the top makuuchi division. In January 1938, he defeated yokozuna Musashiyama, gaining his first kinboshi or gold star. He was promoted to ōzeki in January 1943, but was demoted to sekiwake in May 1944. He was promoted to ōzeki again in November 1946, but he lost all eleven bouts in the November 1947 tournament. He was demoted again in the May 1948 tournament. Of his six tournaments at ozeki rank he only achieved a kachi-koshi or winning record in two of them, and his overall record as an ozeki was 26 wins against 31 losses, with 22 absences.

In the May 1950 tournament, he won his first Fighting Spirit Award. In the September 1952 tournament, he defeated yokozuna Chiyonoyama, gaining a kinboshi and winning his second Fighting Spirit Award. In January 1953 he returned to sekiwake, and he remains the oldest man in the post-war era to be promoted to a san'yaku rank. During the Autumn 1954 tournament which held from September 19 to October 3, he reached his fortieth birthday, and after the tournament he retired from an active wrestler after 22 years in sumo.

After his retirement, he re-established the Kasugayama stable, which he ran until his death in 1971. Among his rikishi was the former maegashira Onobori.

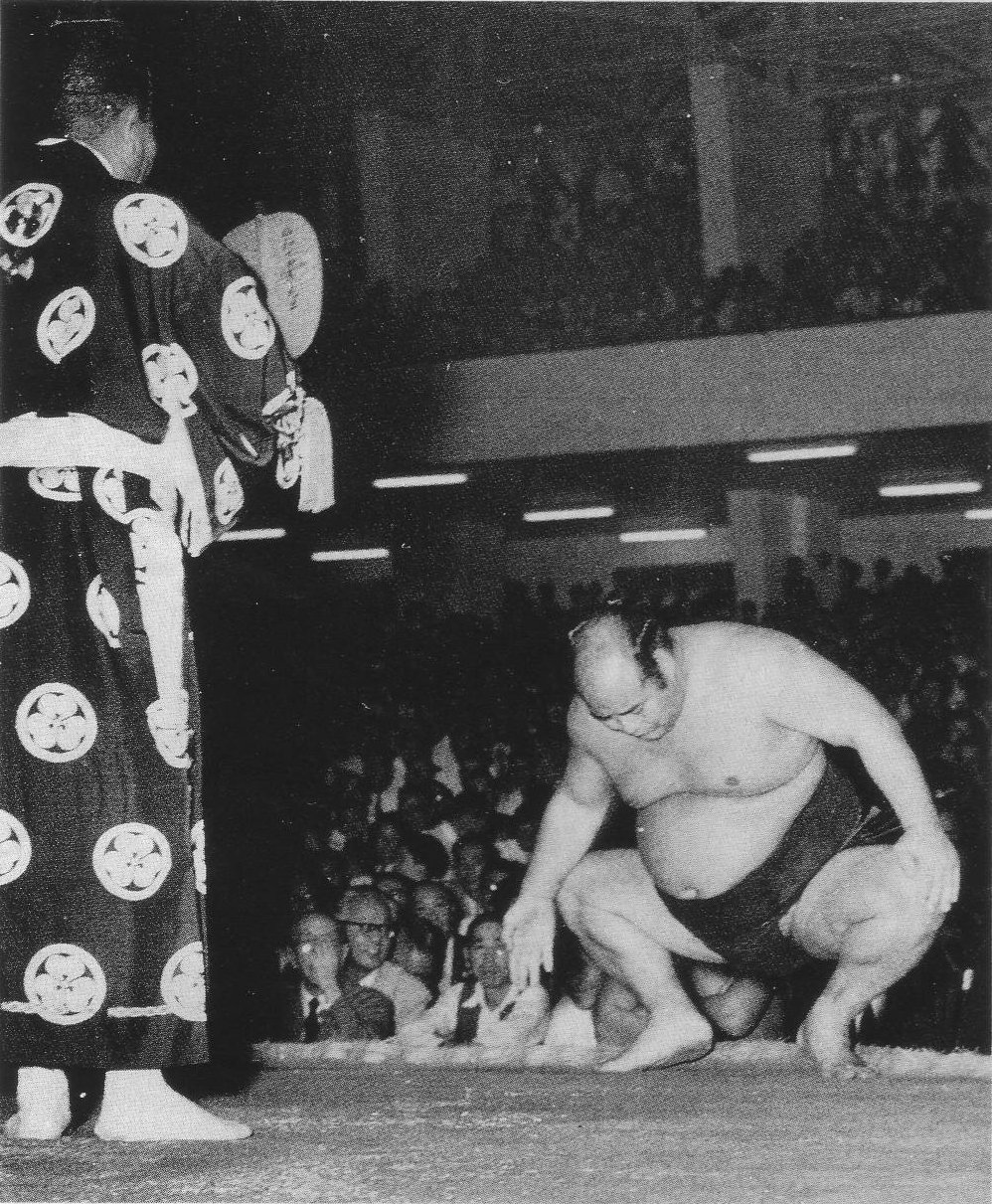
Nayoroiwa pictured during his final tournament in autumn 1954, after winning a bout.

== Career record ==
- Through most of the 1930s and 1940s only two tournaments were held a year, and in 1946 only one was held. The New year tournament began and the Spring tournament returned to Osaka in 1953.

Nayoroiwa Shizuo
| - | Spring Haru basho, Tokyo | Summer Natsu basho, Tokyo | Autumn Aki basho, Tokyo |
|---|---|---|---|
| 1933 | East Jonokuchi #14; 5–1 | West Jonidan #16; 3–3 | Not held |
| 1934 | West Jonidan #12; 2–4 | West Jonidan #18; 5–1 | Not held |
| 1935 | West Sandanme #17; 6–0; Champion | West Makushita #13; 6–5 | Not held |
| 1936 | East Makushita #7; 9–2; Champion | East Jūryō #6; 9–2 | Not held |
| 1937 | West Maegashira #14; 6–5 | East Maegashira #10; 8–5 | Not held |
| 1938 | West Maegashira #2; 8–5 ★ | West Sekiwake #1; 9–4 | Not held |
| 1939 | East Sekiwake #1; 7–6 | West Sekiwake #1; 10–5 | Not held |
| 1940 | East Sekiwake #1; 9–6 | East Sekiwake #1; 7–8 | Not held |
| 1941 | West Komusubi #1; 11–4 | West Sekiwake #2; 10–5 | Not held |
| 1942 | East Sekiwake #2; 10–5 | East Sekiwake #2; 11–4 | Not held |
| 1943 | West Ōzeki #2; 9–6 | East Ōzeki #2; 7–8 | Not held |
| 1944 | West Ōzeki #2; 1–2–12 | East Sekiwake #2; 7–3 | East Sekiwake #1; 7–3 |
| 1945 | Not held | West Sekiwake #1; 3–4 | West Sekiwake #1; 6–4 |
| 1946 | Not held | Not held | West Ōzeki #2; 9–4 |
| 1947 | Not held | East Ōzeki #2; 0–0–10 | East Ōzeki #2; 0–11 |
| 1948 | Not held | East Sekiwake #2; 0–0–11 | East Maegashira #5; 4–7 |
| 1949 | West Maegashira #8; 5–8 | East Maegashira #10; 5–10 | East Maegashira #13; 8–7 |
| 1950 | West Maegashira #9; 3–12 | West Maegashira #14; 9–6; F | West Maegashira #9; 11–4 |
| 1951 | West Maegashira #2; 7–8 | East Maegashira #4; 6–9 | East Maegashira #5; 8–7 |
| 1952 | East Maegashira #2; 7–8 | West Maegashira #3; 7–8 | West Maegashira #3; 9–6; F★ |
Record given as wins–losses–absences Top division champion Top division runner-up Retired Lower divisions Non-participation Sanshō key: F=Fighting spirit; O=Outstanding performance; T=Technique Also shown: ★=Kinboshi; P=Playoff(s); Divisions: Makuuchi — Jūryō — Makushita — Sandanme — Jonidan — Jonokuchi Makuuchi ranks: Yokozuna — Ōzeki — Sekiwake — Komusubi — Maegashira

| - | New Year Hatsu basho, Tokyo | Spring Haru basho, Osaka | Summer Natsu basho, Tokyo | Autumn Aki basho, Tokyo |
|---|---|---|---|---|
| 1953 | West Sekiwake #1; 10–5 | West Sekiwake #1; 4–11 | West Maegashira #3; 7–8 | West Maegashira #3; 4–11 |
| 1954 | East Maegashira #7; 3–12 | West Maegashira #14; 9–6 | West Maegashira #8; 7–8 | East Maegashira #9; Retired; 4–11 |
Record given as wins–losses–absences Top division champion Top division runner-up Retired Lower divisions Non-participation Sanshō key: F=Fighting spirit; O=Outstanding performance; T=Technique Also shown: ★=Kinboshi; P=Playoff(s); Divisions: Makuuchi — Jūryō — Makushita — Sandanme — Jonidan — Jonokuchi Makuuchi ranks: Yokozuna — Ōzeki — Sekiwake — Komusubi — Maegashira

== See also ==
- Glossary of sumo terms
- List of past sumo wrestlers
- List of ōzeki
