= Kasugafuji Akihiro =

Japanese sumo wrestler (1966–2017)

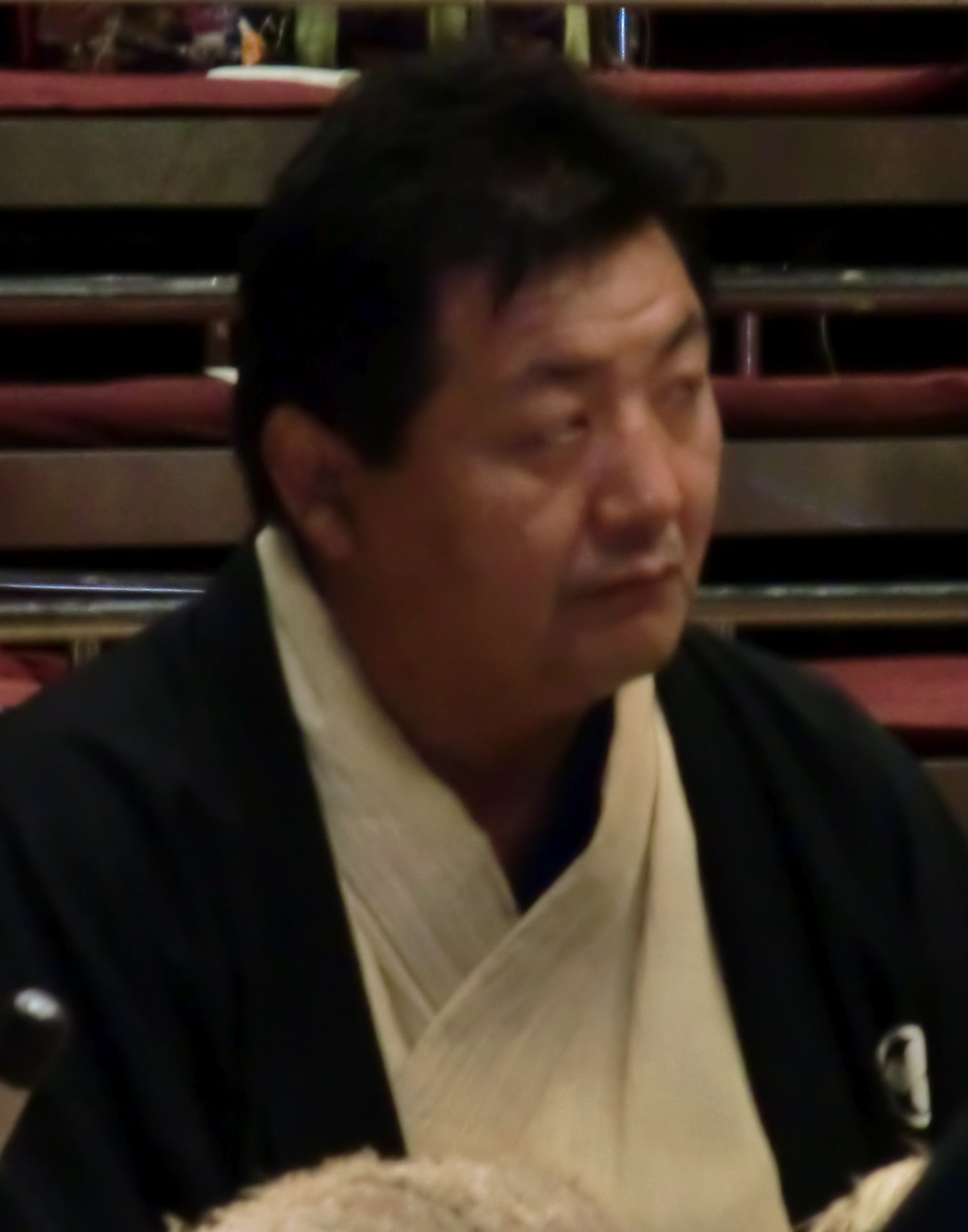

Personal information
- Native name: 春日富士 晃大
- Born: Shoki Iwanaga; February 20, 1966 Oshika, Miyagi, Japan
- Died: March 9, 2017 (aged 51)
- Height: 1.77 m (5 ft 9 1/2 in)
- Weight: 139 kg (306 lb)

Sport
- Sport: Sumo
- Retired: September, 1996
- Heya: Kasugayama → Ajigawa
- Record: 518-542-5
- Debut: March, 1981
- Highest rank: Maegashira 1 (January, 1990)
- Elder name: Kasugayama
- Special Prizes: Fighting Spirit (1)
- Updated on June 2020

Kasugafuji Akihiro (February 20, 1966 – March 9, 2017), born as Shoki Iwanaga, was a Japanese sumo wrestler and coach from Oshika, Miyagi. He was an active wrestler in professional sumo from 1981 until 1996, reaching a highest rank of maegashira 1. After his retirement he re-established the Kasugayama stable in 1997 and trained his own wrestlers. He left the Japan Sumo Association in 2012 after an expenses scandal, and was involved with a legal dispute in 2013 with his successor as head of Kasugayama stable which was not resolved until shortly before his death in 2017.

== Career ==
He made his professional debut in March 1981, joining Kasugayama stable. He rose slowly through the ranks, having to overcome the disadvantage of being much shorter than most of his competitors at just 1.77 m (5 ft 9 1/2 in). He became a sekitori upon promotion to the second highest juryo division in January 1988. He reached the top makuuchi division in March 1989, reaching his highest rank of maegashira 1 in January 1990. In the same year his stable closed when his stable-master, former maegashira Ōnobori, retired and he moved to Ajigawa stable. He had another change of coach in 1993 when the stablemaster of Ajigawa, ex-sekiwake Mutsuarashi, retired due to ill-health. Unusually, Kasugafuji had previously fought his new stablemaster, ex-yokozuna Asahifuji, in tournament competition. He earned a special prize for Fighting Spirit in July 1990. He fought in the top division for a total of 42 tournaments, making his final appearance in May 1996.

== Retirement from sumo ==
He retired in September 1996, after more than 15 years in sumo and 1060 consecutive matches. He became an elder of the Japan Sumo Association under the name of Kasugayama Oyakata. He re-established the Kasugayama stable in 1997 and coached the Korean-born wrestler Kasugao to the top division in 2003. Kasugao was one of a number of wrestlers force to retire in 2011 because of a match-fixing scandal, and as a result his stable lost its only sekitori. In February 2012 he was elected to the Sumo Association's board of directors, and as a result stood down from the day-to-day running of the stable. He passed control over to the former Hamanishiki and switched elder names with him, becoming Ikazuchi Oyakata.

He was forced to resign from the Sumo Association in September 2012 in a scandal involving a bogus expense claim to cover up an affair with a female employee of the Association.

In October 2013 he sued Kasugayama Oyakata (former maegashira Hamanishiki) for not paying the rent of Kasugayama stable. Kasugayama counter-sued over ex-Kasugafuji's failure to hand over control of the elder stock (toshiyori-kabu). The case went to trial in July 2014. Kasugafuji's legal team claimed that in 35 years as a coach (from his retirement as an active wrestler at age 30 to his mandatory retirement as a coach at age 65) he would have earned 430 million yen from the Sumo Association. The two sides settled the stable rent issue in June 2015, with the current Kasugayama agreeing to move to new premises, but Kasugafuji continued to refuse to hand over the kabu certificate and the ongoing legal dispute led to Hamanishiki being forced to dissolve Kasugayama stable in October 2016 and resign from the Sumo Association altogether in January 2017. The remaining issues were settled in February 2017.

== Fighting style ==
Kasugafuji favoured pushing and thrusting (oshi-sumo) techniques and his most common winning kimarite was oshi-dashi. Although not his preferred style he was also competent on the opponent's mawashi using grappling (yotsu-sumo) techniques.

== Death ==
According to Sumo Association officials, he died on March 9, 2017. The cause of death was not disclosed at the request of his family, although it was reported to be heart failure.

== Career record ==
Kasugafuji Akihiro
Year	January Hatsu basho, Tokyo	March Haru basho, Osaka	May Natsu basho, Tokyo	July Nagoya basho, Nagoya	September Aki basho, Tokyo	November Kyūshū basho, Fukuoka
1981	x	(Maezumo)	East Jonokuchi #12; 5–2	East Jonidan #91; 3–4	West Jonidan #107; 4–3	West Jonidan #85; 6–1
1982	East Jonidan #17; 2–5	East Jonidan #42; 4–3	West Jonidan #31; 1–6	East Jonidan #59; 2–5	East Jonidan #89; 7–0–P	East Sandanme #69; 1–6
1983	East Jonidan #6; 4–3	West Sandanme #85; 4–3	West Sandanme #65; 5–2	East Sandanme #31; 4–3	West Sandanme #15; 4–3	West Sandanme #5; 4–3
1984	West Makushita #51; 2–5	West Sandanme #16; 4–3	East Sandanme #3; 1–6	West Sandanme #31; 4–3	East Sandanme #18; 5–2	West Makushita #48; 3–4
1985	West Sandanme #1; 2–5	East Sandanme #26; 4–3	East Sandanme #12; 5–2	East Makushita #44; 4–3	West Makushita #34; 4–3	East Makushita #25; 2–5
1986	West Makushita #48; 5–2	East Makushita #30; 4–3	East Makushita #20; 5–2	West Makushita #12; 3–4	West Makushita #17; 5–2	East Makushita #10; 3–4
1987	West Makushita #16; 4–3	East Makushita #12; 4–3	West Makushita #8; 3–4	West Makushita #13; 4–3	West Makushita #8; 6–1	West Makushita #1; 5–2
1988	East Jūryō #11; 8–7	East Jūryō #7; 5–10	East Jūryō #12; 8–7	East Jūryō #11; 7–8	East Jūryō #12; 9–6	East Jūryō #7; 10–5
1989	East Jūryō #1; 9–6	West Maegashira #10; 8–7	East Maegashira #4; 4–11	West Maegashira #11; 7–8	East Maegashira #12; 9–6	East Maegashira #6; 8–7
1990	East Maegashira #1; 3–12	West Maegashira #11; 9–6	West Maegashira #3; 4–11	West Maegashira #12; 10–5; F	West Maegashira #4; 6–9	East Maegashira #8; 8–7
1991	East Maegashira #5; 5–10	West Maegashira #12; 8–7	West Maegashira #11; 9–6	West Maegashira #4; 5–10	East Maegashira #11; 9–6	East Maegashira #6; 6–9
1992	West Maegashira #10; 8–7	West Maegashira #5; 4–11	West Maegashira #11; 4–11	West Jūryō #3; 8–7	West Jūryō #1; 9–6	West Maegashira #13; 9–6
1993	East Maegashira #11; 6–9	East Maegashira #15; 9–6	West Maegashira #8; 5–10	West Maegashira #14; 9–6	West Maegashira #6; 7–8	West Maegashira #9; 6–9
1994	West Maegashira #13; 9–6	East Maegashira #7; 7–8	East Maegashira #9; 8–7	East Maegashira #3; 5–10	West Maegashira #6; 6–9	East Maegashira #12; 8–7
1995	East Maegashira #9; 7–8	West Maegashira #11; 7–8	West Maegashira #14; 8–7	West Maegashira #11; 7–8	West Maegashira #13; 8–7	West Maegashira #12; 8–7
1996	West Maegashira #10; 6–9	East Maegashira #14; 8–7	West Maegashira #10; 2–13	West Jūryō #6; 5–10	West Jūryō #11; Retired; 0–0–5	x
Record given as wins–losses–absences Top division champion Top division runner-up Retired Lower divisions Non-participation Sanshō key: F=Fighting spirit; O=Outstanding performance; T=Technique Also shown: ★=Kinboshi; P=Playoff(s); Divisions: Makuuchi — Jūryō — Makushita — Sandanme — Jonidan — Jonokuchi Makuuchi ranks: Yokozuna — Ōzeki — Sekiwake — Komusubi — Maegashira

== See also ==
- Glossary of sumo terms
- List of past sumo wrestlers
