= Ōnoshō Fumiya =

Japanese sumo wrestler

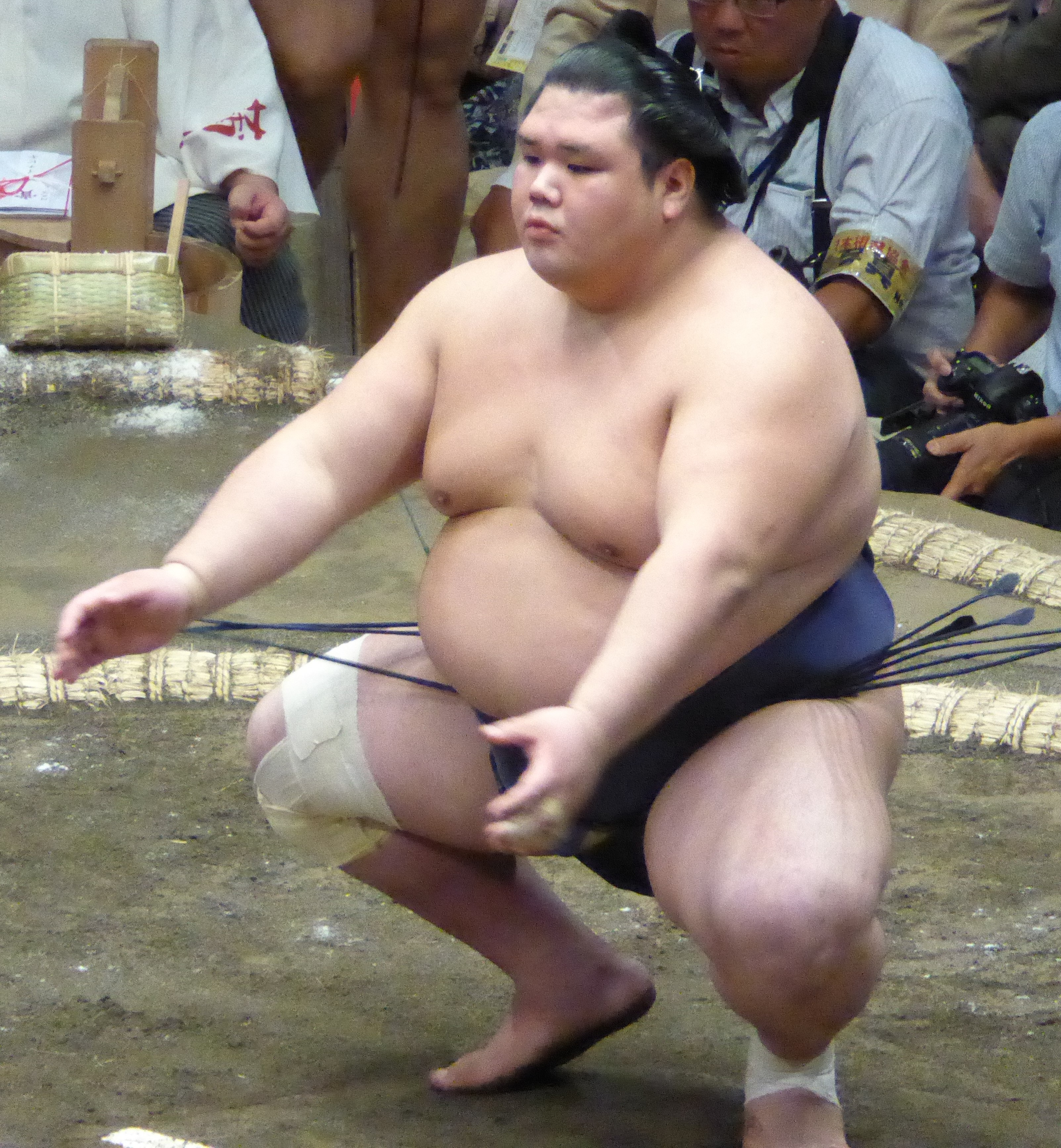
- Ōnoshō in 2018

Personal information
- Native name: 阿武咲 奎也
- Born: Fumiya Utetsu; July 4, 1996 (age 30) Nakadomari, Aomori Prefecture, Japan
- Height: 1.76 m (5 ft 9 1/2 in)
- Weight: 165 kg (364 lb; 26.0 st)

Sport
- Sport: Sumo
- Retired: 18 December 2024
- Heya: Ōnomatsu
- Record: 473-422-59
- Debut: January 2013
- Highest rank: Komusubi (November 2017)
- Championships: 1 (Jūryō)
- Special Prizes: Fighting Spirit (3); Outstanding Performance (1)
- Gold Stars: 2 (Harumafuji, Hakuhō)
- Updated on 18 December 2024

Ōnoshō Fumiya (Japanese: 阿武咲 奎也; born July 4, 1996, as Fumiya Utetsu (打越 奎也, Utetsu Fumiya)) is a Japanese retired professional sumo wrestler from Nakadomari, Aomori Prefecture. He debuted in professional sumo in January 2013 for Ōnomatsu stable and made his top division debut in May 2017. He won one championship in the second-highest jūryō division and four special prizes in his career, as well as two gold stars for defeating a yokozuna while ranked as a maegashira. His highest rank was komusubi.

== Background ==
Fumiya Utetsu was born in Nakadomari, a small town on the northern tip of Honshu. Growing up, he enjoyed skiing and snowboarding. He became interested in sumo wrestling at the age of five after encouragement from his grandfather, and began to train at his local gym. When at Nakasato Elementary School, he was trained by Takarafuji, as both are from the same hometown, Takarafuji being in his second year at Goshogawara Commercial High School when Ōnoshō was in his first year of elementary school. When in elementary school, he also met Takakeishō and later confessed that he "hated him" but that they have since formed a friendship and a friendly rivalry. When in Nakasato Junior High School, he participated in the very first Hakuhō Cup in 2010, and his Aomori team won the team competition of that year. After that, he enrolled at Sanbongi Agricultural High School alongside Nishikifuji, and there he notably won the individual competition at the 2012 Gifu National Athletic Sumo Championships. While still an amateur, he and his team would visit the Kindai University sumo club, where Ōnoshō was thus trained by his senior Tokushōryū, among others. In November 2012, he decided to drop out and turned pro, sharing the same newcomer promotion as Ishiura and Abi. He joined Ōnomatsu stable and adopted the shikona, or ring name, Ōnoshō, in reference to his stable and including the kanji for "to bloom" (咲) reflecting the hopes of his master (former sekiwake Masurao).

== Career ==
=== Early career ===
Ōnoshō made his professional debut at the age of sixteen in the Osaka tournament in March 2013. He quickly moved through the lower divisions and reached the third highest makushita division in November of the same year. Seven consecutive winning records (kachi-koshi) saw him promoted to the second division (jūryō) for the January 2015 tournament. This promotion makes Ōnoshō the 10th youngest juryō promoted since the Shōwa era. This promotion also makes Ōnoshō the 128th sekitori of Aomori Prefecture and the first since Homarefuji in 2012. Yokozuna Hakuhō also commented when referring to Ōnoshō that he was one of the most promising young talents in sumo at the time. Competing against more experienced opponents he however made relatively little impact in his first jūryō run but looked to be maintaining his place in the division before sustaining an injury in November 2015. A 5–10 record in March 2016 saw him relegated for the first time in his wrestling career. He rebounded by winning all seven of his bouts in makushita in May and was promoted back up to the second division despite losing in a play-off for the championship to Oyanagi. Over the next six tournaments, Ōnoshō worked his way up the ranks of jūryō and a 9–6 result in March 2017 clinched his promotion to sumo's top division (makuuchi) for the first time.

=== Makuuchi career ===
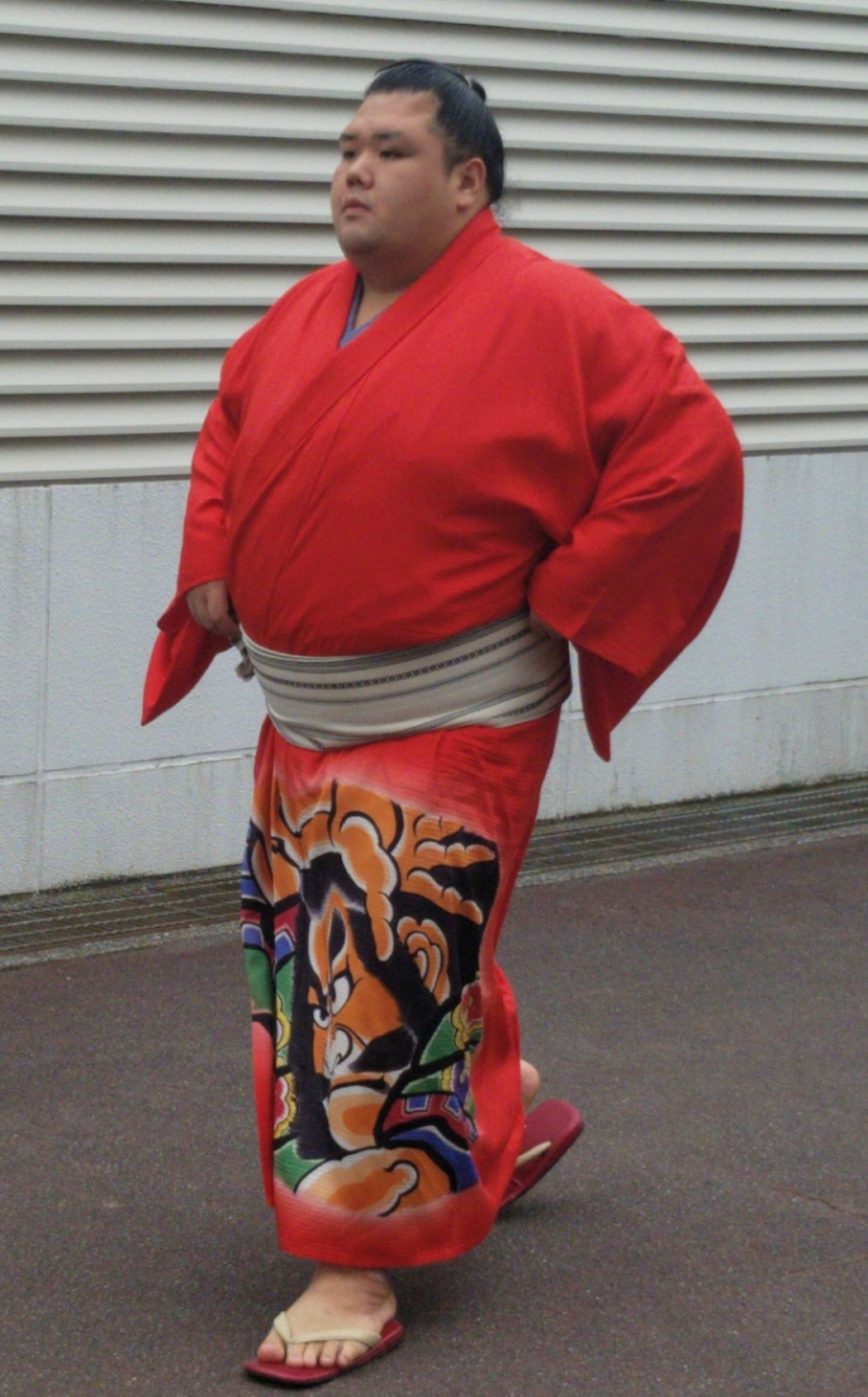
Ōnoshō in September 2019

In his first tournament in the top division Ōnoshō was assigned the rank of maegashira 14. He recovered from an opening day defeat to Daishōmaru to record a 10–5 result, with his defeated opponents including other promising young wrestlers such as Hokutofuji, Ishiura and Kagayaki, as well as more experienced foes such as Kaisei and Myōgiryū. His efforts saw him being rewarded with the special prize for Fighting Spirit as well as promotion to maegashira 6 for the next tournament. In the following July tournament he was one of only two wrestlers to defeat the eventual runner-up Aoiyama, and he finished with another 10–5 record. In September 2017 at the rank of maegashira 3 he earned a kinboshi by defeating the eventual yūshō winner Harumafuji on his way to a second Fighting Spirit prize and a third 10–5 record. He thereby became the first rikishi since the 38th yokozuna Terukuni (and thus the first wrestler in the era of the six tournament system) to achieve double-digit records in each of his first three makuuchi tournaments. He was promoted to the san'yaku ranks at komusubi for the November 2017 tournament, becoming only the second wrestler ever from his stable after Wakakōyū in 2012 to achieve this feat. After losing six of his first seven bouts in November, he recovered in the second week of the tournament and secured his majority of wins on the final day. He withdrew from the January 2018 tournament on Day 10 with a posterior cruciate ligament injury to the right knee. The injury kept him out of the following tournament in March and saw him relegated to jūryō. In May, however, he returned to action and secured his promotion back to the top division as he won the jūryō title by defeating Tsurugishō and ending the tournament with a 12–3 record. In November of the same year, Ōnoshō ended the tournament with an 11–4 record and won his third Fighting Spirit prize after defeating Yutakayama, who was also competing for the prize and would have won it had he won the match. This performance saw him being promoted to east maegashira 6 for the next tournament in which he got an 8–7 score. He had an unremarkable 2019, not being able to mount a serious challenge for promotion back to san'yaku. In March 2020, he earned his second kinboshi by defeating Hakuhō for the first time. He finished the tournament with a 9–6 record and the Outstanding Performance prize.

Ōnoshō withdrew from the May 2022 tournament after fracturing his left rib in his Day 5 loss to Takakeishō. In the January 2023 tournament he led the field outright on Day 12 with ten wins and two losses. However he had a disappointing end to the tournament, losing his last three matches and missing out on the Fighting Spirit Prize on Day 15 after being disqualified for a hair-pull on Hōshōryū. In the March 2023 basho, Ōnoshō withdrew on Day 9 following injuries to both of his knees two days earlier. During the rest of the year Ōnoshō achieved modest results, however, recording a poor score of 3–12 at the November tournament. This score logically relegated him to the lowest ranks of the makuuchi division.

In the first half of the January 2024 tournament, Ōnoshō recorded a good performance, keeping himself among the leading wrestlers for the title race. Ōnoshō, however, suffered two consecutive defeats at the hands of Ōzeki Kirishima and Yokozuna Terunofuji on Days 10 and 11 respectively, effectively removing him from the title race.

=== Demotion and retirement ===
Ōnoshō withdrew from the July 2024 tournament after suffering three defeats in the first three days, with his medical certificate reporting right ankle arthritis and ligament damage in his right knee requiring about three weeks of treatment. It was later revealed in August that he had undergone ankle surgery. His absence from the July tournament saw him drop to the jūryō division for the first time in six years.

Ōnoshō suffered poor performances in the last two tournaments of 2024 due to continued right ankle and right knee issues, and had faced certain demotion to the makushita division. On 18 December 2024, the Sumo Association announced Ōnoshō's retirement from professional competition. At a press conference the following day, Ōnoshō said that he would not remain with the Sumo Association and instead join a company that specializes in beauty products using horse ointment. He became emotional when asked about his rivalry with the recently retired Minatogawa (former ōzeki Takakeishō), with whom he had been competing since elementary school days, saying that he was unable to express his thanks to him until retiring.

Ōnoshō's retirement ceremony was held at the Ryōgoku Kokugikan on 1 June 2025, with some 400 individuals taking turns snipping the chonmage before the final cut was made by stablemaster Ōnomatsu (former maegashira Daidō).

== Fighting style ==
Ōnoshō had a preference for oshi techniques (pushing and thrusting) rather than grasping his opponent's mawashi or belt. His most common kimarite or winning move was oshidashi (frontal push-out), responsible for 41 percent of his career victories. His style was regarded as aggressive, with him looking to move forward and finish the match as quickly as possible. However, since his 2018 injury layoff, he had sought to add more variety to his technique.

== Personal life ==
Ōnoshō is known for his love of music, and is also very fond of karaoke. He is married with three children.

== Career record ==
Ōnoshō Fumiya
Year	January Hatsu basho, Tokyo	March Haru basho, Osaka	May Natsu basho, Tokyo	July Nagoya basho, Nagoya	September Aki basho, Tokyo	November Kyūshū basho, Fukuoka
2013	(Maezumo)	East Jonokuchi #7; 6–1	East Jonidan #17; 6–1	West Sandanme #55; 6–1	West Sandanme #3; 4–3	West Makushita #54; 5–2
2014	East Makushita #34; 4–3	East Makushita #28; 5–2	East Makushita #16; 5–2	East Makushita #10; 4–3	East Makushita #8; 5–2	East Makushita #3; 5–2
2015	East Jūryō #11; 8–7	East Jūryō #9; 7–8	East Jūryō #10; 8–7	East Jūryō #8; 7–8	East Jūryō #9; 9–6	West Jūryō #6; 4–10–1
2016	East Jūryō #14; 8–7	West Jūryō #12; 5–10	West Makushita #3; 7–0–P	East Jūryō #12; 7–8	East Jūryō #12; 11–4	East Jūryō #4; 7–8
2017	West Jūryō #5; 9–6	West Jūryō #2; 9–6	East Maegashira #14; 10–5; F	West Maegashira #6; 10–5	East Maegashira #3; 10–5; F★	West Komusubi #1; 8–7
2018	West Komusubi #1; 4–6–5	West Maegashira #5; Sat out due to injury 0–0–15	West Jūryō #1; 12–3; Champion	West Maegashira #11; 10–5	West Maegashira #6; 4–11	East Maegashira #13; 11–4; F
2019	West Maegashira #6; 8–7	West Maegashira #5; 5–10	West Maegashira #10; 8–7	East Maegashira #8; 6–9	East Maegashira #11; 9–6	East Maegashira #6; 7–8
2020	West Maegashira #7; 9–6	West Maegashira #5; 9–6; O★	West Maegashira #2; Tournament Cancelled; State of Emergency; 0–0–0	West Maegashira #2; 2–13	West Maegashira #9; 10–5	East Maegashira #2; 7–8
2021	West Maegashira #3; 9–6	West Maegashira #1; 4–11	West Maegashira #5; 7–8	East Maegashira #6; 7–8	West Maegashira #6; 10–5	East Maegashira #2; 5–10
2022	East Maegashira #5; 10–5	East Maegashira #3; 6–9	East Maegashira #5; 2–4–9	East Maegashira #15; 10–5	West Maegashira #7; 5–10	East Maegashira #11; 9–6
2023	East Maegashira #8; 10–5	East Maegashira #4; 4–5–6	East Maegashira #9; 8–7	West Maegashira #5; 6–9	East Maegashira #6; 9–6	East Maegashira #5; 3–12
2024	West Maegashira #14; 10–5	East Maegashira #8; 9–6	East Maegashira #5; 7–8	East Maegashira #5; 0–4–11	West Jūryō #1; 1–4–10	East Jūryō #10; 2–11–2
2025	East Makushita #3; Retired –	x	x	x	x	x
Record given as wins–losses–absences Top division champion Top division runner-up Retired Lower divisions Non-participation Sanshō key: F=Fighting spirit; O=Outstanding performance; T=Technique Also shown: ★=Kinboshi; P=Playoff(s); Divisions: Makuuchi — Jūryō — Makushita — Sandanme — Jonidan — Jonokuchi Makuuchi ranks: Yokozuna — Ōzeki — Sekiwake — Komusubi — Maegashira

== See also ==
- Glossary of sumo terms
- List of past sumo wrestlers
- List of komusubi
- List of sumo tournament second division champions
