= 2017 in sumo =

The following were the events in professional sumo during 2017.

== Tournaments ==
=== Hatsu basho ===
Ryōgoku Kokugikan, Tokyo, 8 January – 22 January

2017 Hatsu basho results - Makuuchi Division
W		L		A	East			Rank	West			W		L		A
5	-	6	-	4	ø	(Mongolia)	Kakuryū	Y	ø	(Mongolia)	Harumafuji	4	-	3	-	8
11	-	4	-	0		(Mongolia)	**Hakuhō**	Y								
14	-	1	-	0		(Japan)	**Kisenosato**	O	ø	(Japan)	**Gōeidō**	8	-	5	-	2
4	-	11	-	0		(Mongolia)	Terunofuji	O		(Japan)	Kotoshōgiku	5	-	10	-	0
9	-	6	-	0		(Mongolia)	**Tamawashi**	S		(Japan)	Shōdai	7	-	8	-	0
11	-	4	-	0		(Japan)	**Takayasu**	K	ø	(Georgia (country))	Tochinoshin	0	-	6	-	9
6	-	9	-	0		(Japan)	Takarafuji	M1		(Japan)	**Mitakeumi**	11	-	4	-	0
7	-	8	-	0		(Japan)	Shōhōzan	M2		(Mongolia)	Arawashi	6	-	9	-	0
4	-	11	-	0		(Japan)	Okinoumi	M3		(Japan)	**Ikioi**	8	-	7	-	0
3	-	12	-	0		(Japan)	Tochiōzan	M4		(Japan)	Endō	7	-	8	-	0
10	-	5	-	0		(Japan)	**Takekaze**	M5		(Japan)	**Yoshikaze**	8	-	7	-	0
7	-	8	-	0		(Mongolia)	Chiyoshōma	M6		(Japan)	Kotoyūki	6	-	9	-	0
4	-	11	-	0		(Japan)	Myōgiryū	M7		(Bulgaria)	**Aoiyama**	8	-	7	-	0
9	-	6	-	0		(Japan)	**Hokutofuji**	M8		(Japan)	**Chiyonokuni**	9	-	6	-	0
8	-	7	-	0		(Brazil)	**Kaisei**	M9		(Japan)	Ishiura	6	-	9	-	0
11	-	4	-	0		(Mongolia)	**Takanoiwa**	M10		(China)	**Sōkokurai**	12	-	3	-	0
8	-	7	-	0		(Japan)	**Kagayaki**	M11		(Japan)	Nishikigi	5	-	10	-	0
7	-	8	-	0		(Japan)	Takakeishō	M12		(Japan)	Daishōmaru	7	-	8	-	0
5	-	10	-	0		(Georgia (country))	Gagamaru	M13		(Mongolia)	**Ichinojō**	11	-	4	-	0
6	-	9	-	0		(Japan)	Chiyoōtori	M14		(Japan)	Chiyotairyū	6	-	9	-	0
7	-	8	-	0		(Japan)	Chiyoo	M15		(Japan)	**Sadanoumi**	8	-	7	-	0
4	-	11	-	0		(Egypt)	Ōsunaarashi	M16								

ø - Indicates a pull-out or absent rank
**winning record in bold**
**Yusho Winner**

=== Haru basho ===
Osaka Prefectural Gymnasium, Osaka, 12 March – 26 March

2017 Haru basho results - Makuuchi Division
W		L		A	East			Rank	West			W		L		A
2	-	3	-	10	ø	(Mongolia)	Hakuhō	Y		(Mongolia)	**Kakuryū**	10	-	5	-	0
10	-	5	-	0		(Mongolia)	**Harumafuji**	Y		(Japan)	**Kisenosato**	13	-	2	-	0
1	-	5	-	9	ø	(Japan)	Gōeidō	O		(Mongolia)	**Terunofuji**	13	-	2	-	0
8	-	7	-	0		(Mongolia)	**Tamawashi**	S		(Japan)	**Takayasu**	12	-	3	-	0
9	-	6	-	0		(Japan)	**Kotoshōgiku**	S	ø			0	-	0	-	0
9	-	6	-	0		(Japan)	**Mitakeumi**	K		(Japan)	Shōdai	4	-	11	-	0
5	-	10	-	0		(Japan)	Takekaze	M1		(Japan)	Ikioi	5	-	10	-	0
4	-	11	-	0		(China)	Sōkokurai	M2		(Mongolia)	Takanoiwa	6	-	9	-	0
5	-	10	-	0		(Japan)	Shōhōzan	M3		(Japan)	Takarafuji	7	-	8	-	0
8	-	7	-	0		(Japan)	**Yoshikaze**	M4	ø	(Mongolia)	Arawashi	3	-	10	-	2
8	-	7	-	0		(Japan)	**Endō**	M5		(Japan)	Hokutofuji	7	-	8	-	0
9	-	6	-	0		(Japan)	**Chiyonokuni**	M6		(Bulgaria)	**Aoiyama**	8	-	7	-	0
6	-	9	-	0		(Mongolia)	Ichinojō	M7		(Mongolia)	**Chiyoshōma**	9	-	6	-	0
3	-	7	-	5	ø	(Brazil)	Kaisei	M8		(Japan)	**Okinoumi**	10	-	5	-	0
7	-	8	-	0		(Japan)	Kagayaki	M9		(Japan)	Kotoyūki	5	-	10	-	0
7	-	8	-	0		(Georgia (country))	Tochinoshin	M10		(Japan)	**Tochiōzan**	10	-	5	-	0
11	-	4	-	0		(Japan)	**Daieishō**	M11		(Japan)	Ishiura	7	-	8	-	0
4	-	11	-	0		(Japan)	Sadanoumi	M12		(Japan)	**Ura**	8	-	7	-	0
11	-	4	-	0		(Japan)	**Takakeishō**	M13		(Japan)	Daishōmaru	7	-	8	-	0
6	-	9	-	0		(Japan)	Myōgiryū	M14		(Mongolia)	Kyokushūhō	5	-	10	-	0
3	-	8	-	4	ø	(Japan)	Chiyoo	M15		(Japan)	**Tokushōryū**	8	-	7	-	0
5	-	10	-	0		(Japan)	Nishikigi	M16	ø			0	-	0	-	0

ø - Indicates a pull-out or absent rank
**winning record in bold**
**Yusho Winner**

=== Natsu basho ===
Ryōgoku Kokugikan, Tokyo, 14 May – 28 May

2017 Natsu basho results - Makuuchi Division
W		L		A	East			Rank	West			W		L		A
6	-	5	-	4	ø	(Japan)	Kisenosato	Y	ø	(Mongolia)	Kakuryū	1	-	4	-	10
11	-	4	-	0		(Mongolia)	**Harumafuji**	Y		(Mongolia)	**Hakuhō**	15	-	0	-	0
12	-	3	-	0		(Mongolia)	**Terunofuji**	O		(Japan)	**Gōeidō**	9	-	6	-	0
10	-	5	-	0		(Mongolia)	**Tamawashi**	S		(Japan)	**Takayasu**	11	-	4	-	0
7	-	8	-	0		(Japan)	Kotoshōgiku	S	ø			0	-	0	-	0
8	-	7	-	0		(Japan)	**Mitakeumi**	K		(Japan)	**Yoshikaze**	8	-	7	-	0
2	-	13	-	0		(Japan)	Chiyonokuni	M1		(Japan)	Endō	6	-	9	-	0
3	-	12	-	0		(Japan)	**Okinoumi**	M2		(Mongolia)	Chiyoshōma	5	-	10	-	0
4	-	11	-	0		(Japan)	Daieishō	M3		(Bulgaria)	Aoiyama	4	-	11	-	0
6	-	9	-	0		(Japan)	Tochiōzan	M4		(Japan)	Takarafuji	3	-	12	-	0
5	-	7	-	3	ø	(Mongolia)	Takanoiwa	M5		(Japan)	**Shōdai**	10	-	5	-	0
4	-	11	-	0		(Japan)	Takekaze	M6		(Japan)	**Ikioi**	9	-	6	-	0
10	-	5	-	0		(Japan)	**Hokutofuji**	M7		(Japan)	**Takakeishō**	11	-	4	-	0
6	-	9	-	0		(Japan)	Shōhōzan	M8		(China)	Sōkokurai	5	-	10	-	0
8	-	7	-	0		(Mongolia)	**Ichinojō**	M9		(Japan)	**Kagayaki**	9	-	6	-	0
12	-	3	-	0		(Georgia (country))	**Tochinoshin**	M10		(Japan)	**Ura**	11	-	4	-	0
7	-	8	-	0		(Mongolia)	Arawashi	M11		(Japan)	**Ishiura**	8	-	7	-	0
8	-	7	-	0		(Japan)	**Tokushōryū**	M12		(Japan)	Kotoyūki	6	-	9	-	0
4	-	11	-	0		(Japan)	Toyohibiki	M13		(Japan)	**Daishōmaru**	8	-	7	-	0
10	-	5	-	0		(Japan)	**Ōnoshō**	M14		(Japan)	**Chiyotairyū**	9	-	6	-	0
4	-	11	-	0		(Japan)	Myōgiryū	M15		(Brazil)	Kaisei	7	-	8	-	0
4	-	11	-	0		(Japan)	Yutakayama	M16	ø			0	-	0	-	0

ø - Indicates a pull-out or absent rank
**winning record in bold**
**Yusho Winner**

=== Nagoya basho ===
Aichi Prefectural Gymnasium, Nagoya, 9 July – 23 July

2017 Nagoya basho results - Makuuchi Division
W		L		A	East			Rank	West			W		L		A
14	-	1	-	0		(Mongolia)	**Hakuhō**	Y		(Mongolia)	**Harumafuji**	11	-	4	-	0
2	-	4	-	9	ø	(Japan)	Kisenosato	Y	ø	(Mongolia)	Kakuryū	2	-	2	-	11
1	-	5	-	9	ø	(Mongolia)	**Terunofuji**	O		(Japan)	Gōeidō	7	-	8	-	0
9	-	6	-	0		(Japan)	**Takayasu**	O	ø				-		-	
7	-	8	-	0		(Mongolia)	Tamawashi	S		(Japan)	**Mitakeumi**	9	-	6	-	0
9	-	6	-	0		(Japan)	**Yoshikaze**	K		(Japan)	Kotoshōgiku	7	-	8	-	0
5	-	10	-	0		(Japan)	Shōdai	M1		(Japan)	Takakeishō	5	-	10	-	0
9	-	6	-	0		(Georgia (country))	**Tochinoshin**	M2		(Japan)	**Hokutofuji**	8	-	7	-	0
4	-	11	-	0		(Japan)	Ikioi	M3	ø	(Japan)	Endō	2	-	3	-	10
7	-	8	-	0		(Japan)	Ura	M4		(Japan)	Kagayaki	5	-	10	-	
5	-	10	-	0		(Mongolia)	Chiyoshōma	M5		(Japan)	**Tochiōzan**	12	-	3	-	0
7	-	8	-	0		(Mongolia)	Ichinojō	M6		(Japan)	**Ōnoshō**	10	-	5	-	0
6	-	9	-	0		(Mongolia)	Takanoiwa	M7		(Japan)	Daieishō	5	-	10	-	0
13	-	2	-	0		(Bulgaria)	**Aoiyama**	M8		(Japan)	Ishiura	7	-	8	-	0
4	-	11	-	0		(Japan)	Tokushōryū	M9		(Japan)	Okinoumi	5	-	10	-	0
10	-	5	-	0		(Japan)	**Chiyotairyū**	M10		(Japan)	**Shōhōzan**	10	-	5	-	0
8	-	7	-	0		(Japan)	**Chiyonokuni**	M11		(Japan)	Daishōmaru	7	-	8	-	0
8	-	7	-	0		(Mongolia)	**Arawashi**	M12		(Japan)	**Takekaze**	8	-	7	-	0
9	-	6	-	0		(Japan)	**Takarafuji**	M13		(China)	Sōkokurai	6	-	9	-	0
8	-	7	-	0		(Japan)	**Sadanoumi**	M14		(Japan)	Kotoyūki	4	-	11	-	0
8	-	7	-	0		(Japan)	**Nishikigi**	M15		(Japan)	**Chiyomaru**	9	-	6	-	0
3	-	12	-	0		(Georgia (country))	Gagamaru	M16	ø			0	-	0	-	0

ø - Indicates a pull-out or absent rank
**winning record in bold**
**Yusho Winner**

=== Aki basho ===
Ryōgoku Kokugikan, Tokyo, 10 September – 24 September

2017 Nagoya basho results - Makuuchi Division
W		L		A	East			Rank	West			W		L		A
0	-	0	-	15	ø	(Mongolia)	Hakuhō	Y		(Mongolia)	**Harumafuji**	11	-	4	-	0
0	-	0	-	15	ø	(Japan)	Kisenosato	Y	ø	(Mongolia)	Kakuryū	0	-	0	-	15
1	-	2	-	12	ø	(Japan)	Takayasu	O		(Japan)	**Gōeidō**	11	-	4	-	0
1	-	5	-	9	ø	(Mongolia)	Terunofuji	O	ø				-		-	
8	-	7	-	0		(Japan)	**Mitakeumi**	S		(Japan)	**Yoshikaze**	8	-	7	-	0
7	-	8	-	0		(Mongolia)	Tamawashi	K		(Japan)	Tochiōzan	6	-	9	-	0
4	-	11	-	0		(Georgia (country))	Tochinoshin	M1		(Japan)	**Kotoshōgiku**	10	-	5	-	0
7	-	8	-	0		(Japan)	Hokutofuji	M2	ø	(Bulgaria)	Aoiyama	3	-	5	-	7
10	-	5	-	0		(Japan)	**Ōnoshō**	M3		(Japan)	**Chiyotairyū**	8	-	7	-	0
8	-	7	-	0		(Japan)	**Shōhōzan**	M4	ø	(Japan)	Ura	1	-	2	-	12
6	-	9	-	0		(Japan)	Shōdai	M5		(Japan)	**Takakeishō**	9	-	6	-	0
8	-	7	-	0		(Mongolia)	**Ichinojō**	M6		(Japan)	Kagayaki	4	-	11	-	0
9	-	6	-	0		(Japan)	**Chiyonokuni**	M7		(Japan)	Ikioi	6	-	9	-	0
8	-	7	-	0		(Mongolia)	**Chiyoshōma**	M8		(Japan)	**Takarafuji**	9	-	6	-	0
8	-	7	-	0		(Mongolia)	**Takanoiwa**	M9		(Mongolia)	**Arawashi**	9	-	6	-	0
3	-	12	-	0		(Japan)	Ishiura	M10		(Japan)	Takekaze	6	-	9	-	0
8	-	7	-	0		(Japan)	**Daieishō**	M11		(Japan)	**Chiyomaru**	9	-	6	-	0
10	-	5	-	0		(Japan)	**Daishōmaru**	M12	ø	(Japan)	Sadanoumi	2	-	8	-	5
6	-	9	-	0		(Japan)	Nishikigi	M13		(Brazil)	**Kaisei**	9	-	6	-	0
10	-	5	-	0		(Japan)	**Endō**	M14		(Japan)	**Okinoumi**	8	-	7	-	0
4	-	11	-	0		(Japan)	Tokushōryū	M15		(Japan)	Yutakayama	4	-	11	-	0
10	-	5	-	0		(Japan)	**Asanoyama**	M16	ø			0	-	0	-	0

ø - Indicates a pull-out or absent rank
**winning record in bold**
**Yusho Winner**

=== Kyushu basho ===
Fukuoka Kokusai Center, Kyushu, 12 November – 26 November

2017 Nagoya basho results - Makuuchi Division
W		L		A	East			Rank	West			W		L		A
0	-	3	-	12	ø	(Mongolia)	Harumafuji	Y		(Mongolia)	**Hakuhō**	14	-	1	-	0
4	-	6	-	5	ø	(Japan)	Kisenosato	Y	ø	(Mongolia)	Kakuryū	0	-	0	-	15
9	-	6	-	0		(Japan)	**Gōeidō**	O	ø	(Japan)	**Takayasu**	8	-	5	-	2
9	-	6	-	0		(Japan)	**Mitakeumi**	S		(Japan)	Yoshikaze	6	-	9	-	0
0	-	5	-	10	ø	(Mongolia)	Terunofuji	S	ø				-		-	
6	-	9	-	0		(Japan)	Kotoshōgiku	K		(Japan)	**Ōnoshō**	8	-	7	-	0
11	-	4	-	0		(Mongolia)	**Tamawashi**	M1		(Japan)	**Takakeishō**	11	-	4	-	0
7	-	8	-	0		(Japan)	Chiyotairyū	M2		(Japan)	Tochiōzan	4	-	11	-	0
3	-	12	-	0		(Japan)	Shōhōzan	M3		(Japan)	**Hokutofuji**	11	-	4	-	0
6	-	9	-	0		(Japan)	Chiyonokuni	M4		(Mongolia)	Ichinojō	10	-	5	-	0
7	-	8	-	0		(Japan)	Takarafuji	M5		(Mongolia)	**Arawashi**	8	-	7	-	0
7	-	8	-	0		(Mongolia)	Chiyoshōma	M6		(Georgia (country))	**Tochinoshin**	9	-	6	-	0
4	-	11	-	0		(Japan)	Daishōmaru	M7		(Japan)	**Shōdai**	9	-	6	-	0
0	-	0	-	15	ø	(Mongolia)	Takanoiwa	M8		(Japan)	Chiyomaru	7	-	8	-	0
9	-	6	-	0		(Japan)	**Endō**	M9		(Japan)	Daieishō	5	-	10	-	0
8	-	7	-	0		(Brazil)	**Kaisei**	M10		(Japan)	**Ikioi**	9	-	6	-	0
3	-	8	-	4	ø	(Bulgaria)	Aoiyama	M11		(Japan)	Asanoyama	5	-	10	-	0
11	-	4	-	0		(Japan)	**Okinoumi**	M12		(Japan)	Kagayaki	7	-	8	-	0
7	-	8	-	0		(Japan)	Takekaze	M13		(Japan)	**Aminishiki**	8	-	7	-	0
8	-	7	-	0		(Japan)	**Kotoyūki**	M14		(Japan)	Daiamami	6	-	9	-	0
7	-	8	-	0		(Japan)	Nishikigi	M15	ø	(Japan)	Myōgiryū	6	-	8	-	1
0	-	0	-	15	ø	(Japan)	Ura	M16	ø			0	-	0	-	0

ø - Indicates a pull-out or absent rank
**winning record in bold**
**Yusho Winner**

== News ==
=== January ===
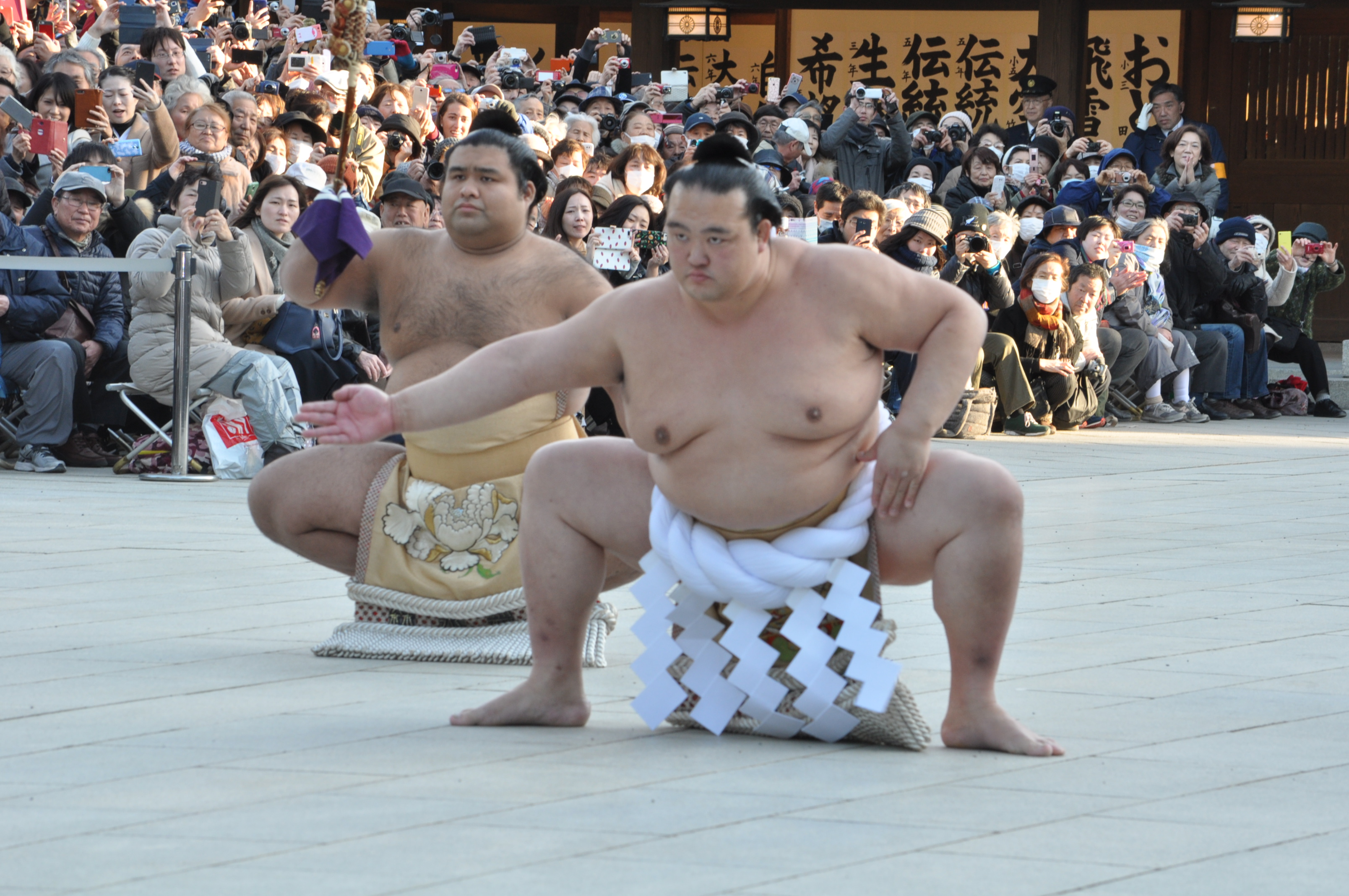
Kisenosato's first public yokozuna duties at the Meiji Shrine on January 27

- 6: The three Mongolian yokozuna Hakuhō, Kakuryū and Harumafuji attend a New Year ceremony at the Meiji Shrine, and perform the dohyo-iri.
- 21: Ōzeki Kisenosato wins his first yūshō or top division championship, after seeing Hakuhō fall to maegashira Takanoiwa. Kisenosato, at 13–1, is two wins ahead of Hakuhō who drops to 11–3, with only one day to go. Kisenosato had been a runner-up on twelve previous occasions.
- 22: On the final day of the Hatsu basho, Kisenosato wraps up his first championship by defeating Hakuhō in the last bout of the day to finish with a 14–1 record. Hakuho, on 11–4, has gone four tournaments without winning a championship for the first time in his ten-year yokozuna career. The runner-up is rank-and-file maegashira Sokokurai on 12–3, who wins his first special prize (for Technique) at the age of 33. He shares the award with Mitakeumi, whose 11–4 record gives him a strong case for promotion back to the sanyaku ranks. The Outstanding Performance Award goes to Takanoiwa (11–4) for his win over Hakuhō. Takayasu wins his fourth Fighting Spirit prize. Ōzeki Terunofuji and Kotoshōgiku both finish with poor 5–10 records. It is Kotoshōgiku's second losing score in a row and he will be demoted to sekiwake for the following tournament. The jūryō division championship is won by Daieishō.
- 22: The process to promote Kisenosato to yokozuna begins as the judges division of the Japan Sumo Association asks chairman Hakkaku Oyakata to hold an extraordinary meeting of its directors, and he agrees.
- 23: Hakkaku asks the Yokozuna Deliberation Council about whether Kisenosato is deserving of promotion to yokozuna. The council decide that he is suitable. Speaking at a press conference, Kisenosato recalls the words of his late stablemaster Takanosato who was also a yokozuna. "He said that 'being a yokozuna is lonely'. I don’t know its meaning yet. But I will make efforts so that I will be able to understand the meaning."
- 25: Kisenosato's yokozuna promotion is confirmed by the Sumo Association's board of directors in a unanimous decision. Kasugano and Takadagawa convey the message to Kisenosato and his stablemaster Tagonoura at a hotel in Tokyo's Chiyoda ward. Kisenosato says "I am honoured to accept the decision. I will do my best not to tarnish the title of yokozuna."
- 27: Kisenosato performs the yokozuna ring-entering ceremony (dohyo-iri) for the first time in public in front of a crowd of 18000 at the Meiji Shrine.
- 31: Magaki Oyakata, former komusubi Tokitenkū, dies of malignant lymphoma at the age of 37. He had retired only last August. His fellow Mongolian Hakuhō pays tribute by saying "I’m in my 30s too, it came too early. He was full of fight when I first faced him, I struggled to see eye to eye. I always had to be careful about his good footwork."

=== February ===
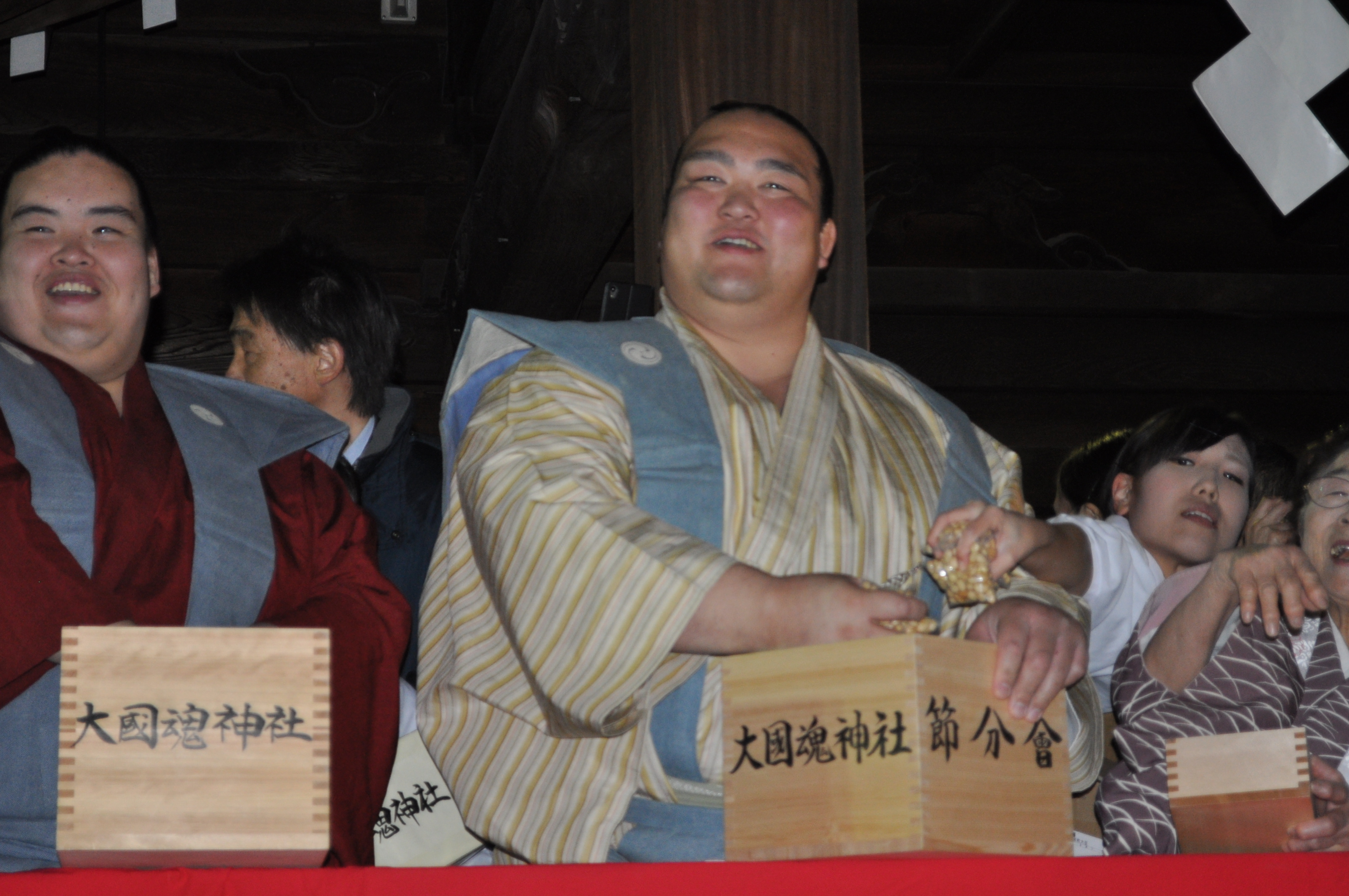
Kisenosato at Setsubun

- 3: Kisenosato and Hakuho throw soy beans at the Narita-san temple in Narita, Chiba Prefecture as part of the annual festival to celebrate Setsubun.
- 5: The 41st Fuji TV Grand Sumo Tournament takes place at the Ryogoku Kokugikan. Yokozuna Kisenosato performs his dohyo-iri in the Kokugikan for the first time. The event is a knock-out format. In the makuuchi competition, the top eight men on the Hatsu tournament banzuke are seeded (except for Harumafuji and Goeido who are injured and do not take part) – Kakuryu (1), Hakuho (2), Kisenosato (3), Terunofuji (4), Kotoshogiku (5), Tamawashi (6), Shodai (7) and Takayasu (8). Kisenosato wins the tournament, defeating Takanoiwa in the final. The juryo tournament is won by Kyokutaisei who defeats Seiro.
- 11:The 50th NHK Charity Sumo Tournament takes place, also at the Kokugikan. This time Harumafuji attends along with the other three yokozuna. Several wrestlers take part in a singing competition with partners or groups: Hakuho with Rimi Natsukawa, Harumafuji with Natsuko Godai, Kakuryu with Midori Oka, Terunofuji with Team Syachihoko, Takayasu with Ai Nishida and Ikioi with Yoshimi Tendo.
- 27: The banzuke for the March tournament is released. Kisenosato is listed on the west side at yokozuna rank, the first Japanese born wrestler since Takanohana in 2003 to be yokozuna on the banzuke. There are three sekiwake following Kotoshogiku's demotion from ozeki. It is the first time since 1949 that there has been a promotion of a yokozuna and a demotion of an ozeki in the same tournament. The only newcomer to the top division is Ura. He is the first former student of Kwansei Gakuin University to reach the top division. Making his juryo debut is Takasago stable's Asanoyama, the first sekitori from Toyama Prefecture since Kotogaume in 1997. His promotion means Takasago stable has a sekitori again after they had none in the previous tournament for the first time in their history.

=== March ===
- 12: The Osaka tournament begins with four yokozuna competing in a honbasho for the first time in 17 years.
- 17: Hakuho withdraws from the tournament because of toe and thigh injuries.
- 24: Having compiled a perfect 12–0 record thus far, Kisenosato loses for the first time as a yokozuna on Day 13, defeated by Harumafuji. He is injured during the match and leaves the arena with his arm in a sling, but does not withdraw from the tournament.
- 26: In a remarkable final day's action, Kisenosato comes from behind to win the tournament by defeating Terunofuji twice – once in their regulation match and again in a playoff. He finishes on 13–2, his only two defeats in the tournament being to his fellow yokozuna Harumafuji and Kakuryu (who both finish with mediocre 10–5 records). He is the first yokozuna to win his debut tournament since Takanohana in January 1995. Terunofuji, seemingly recovered from the knee problems that dogged him throughout 2016, not only saves his ozeki rank but has his first runner-up performance since September 2015. Kisenosato's stablemate Takayasu was the only other wrestler to defeat Terunofuji and finishes with a fine 12–3 record and his third Outstanding Performance Award. Takakeisho receives the Fighting Spirit Prize after winning eleven in only his second top division tournament. Sekiwake Kotoshogiku fails in his bid to return immediately to the ozeki rank, finishing on 9–6, one win short of his minimum target of ten. His sixth defeat on Day 14 saw the crowd boo his opponent, Terunofuji, after Kotoshogiku fell victim to the henka manoeuvre. The juryo division championship is won by veteran Toyohibiki for the third time after a three-way playoff. Down in the jonokuchi division the 46 year-old Hokutoryu announces his retirement after 31 years and 186 tournaments in sumo, leaving Hanakaze (who made his debut alongside Hokutoryu in March 1986) as the last active wrestler from the Shōwa era.

=== April ===
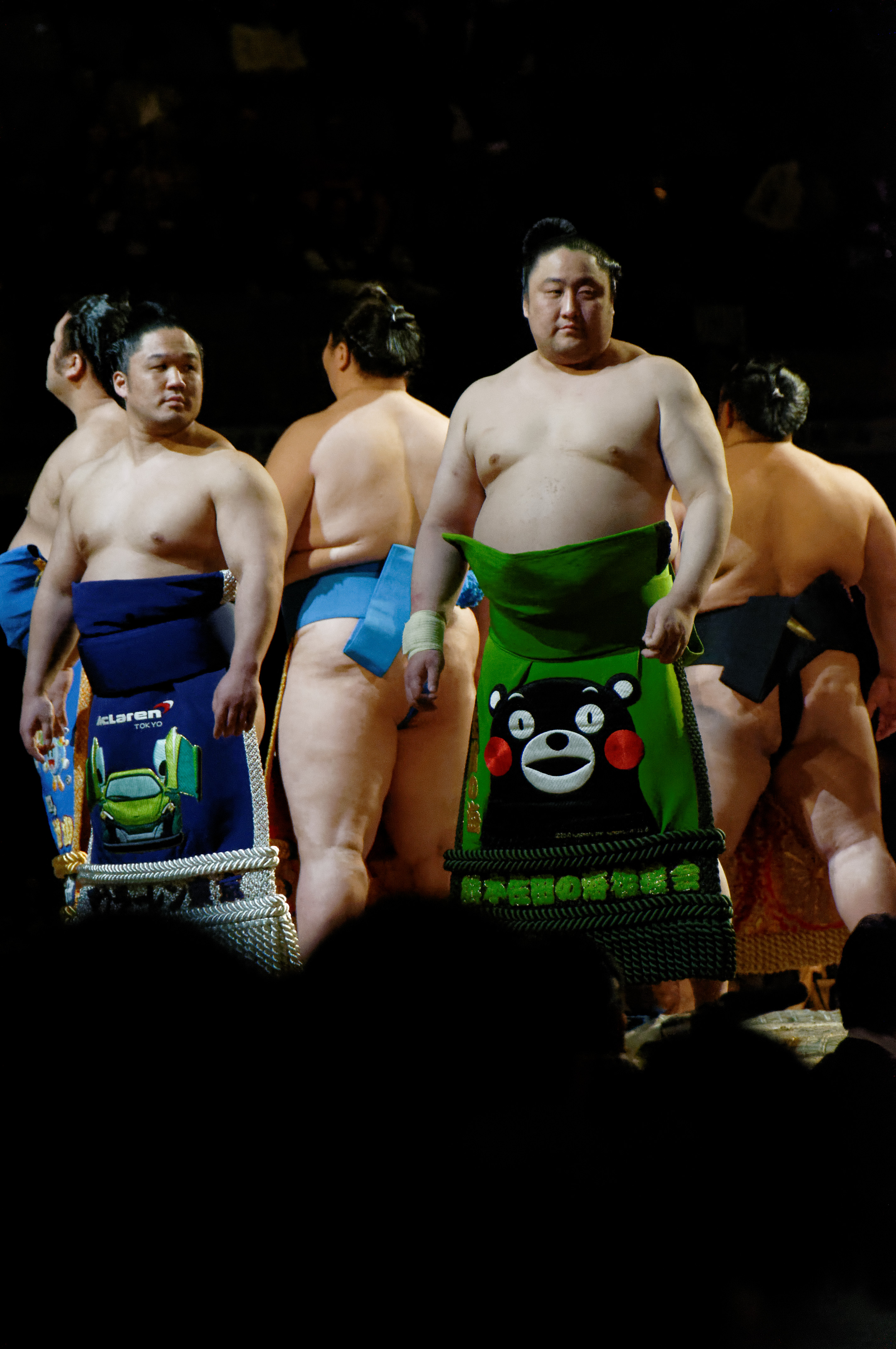
Wrestlers during the April 13 stop in Kawasaki, Kanagawa

- 1: Naruto Oyakata, the former ozeki Kotooshu, branches out from Sadogatake stable and opens his own Naruto stable.
- The spring regional tour visits the following locations:
  - 2: Ise Shrine (Honozumo ceremonial tournament held in the shine's precincts), Mie Prefecture
  - 3: Komaki, Aichi Prefecture
  - 4: Kato, Hyogo Prefecture
  - 5: Takarazuka, Hyogo Prefecture
  - 6: Himeji, Hyogo Prefecture
  - 8: Fujisawa, Kanagawa Prefecture
  - 9: Shizuoka, Shizuoka Prefecture
  - 11: Mishima, Shizuoka Prefecture
  - 12: Yokosuka, Kanagawa Prefecture
  - 13: Kawasaki, Kanagawa Prefecture
  - 14: Matsumoto, Nagano Prefecture
  - 15: Takasaki, Gunma Prefecture
  - 16: Hitachiomiya, Ibaraki Prefecture
  - 17:Yasukuni Shrine (Honozumo ceremonial tournament held in the shrine's precincts), Tokyo
  - 20: Kashiwa, Chiba Prefecture
  - 21: Mito, Ibaraki Prefecture
  - 22: Hachioji, Tokyo Prefecture
  - 23: Machida, Tokyo Prefecture
  - 24: Fukaya, Saitama Prefecture
  - 29: Chokaigi basho, Chiba Prefecture
- 27: Former yokozuna Sadanoyama, who served as the head of the Japan Sumo Association from 1992 to 1998, dies of pneumonia. This leaves Tochinoumi as the oldest living former yokozuna.

=== May ===
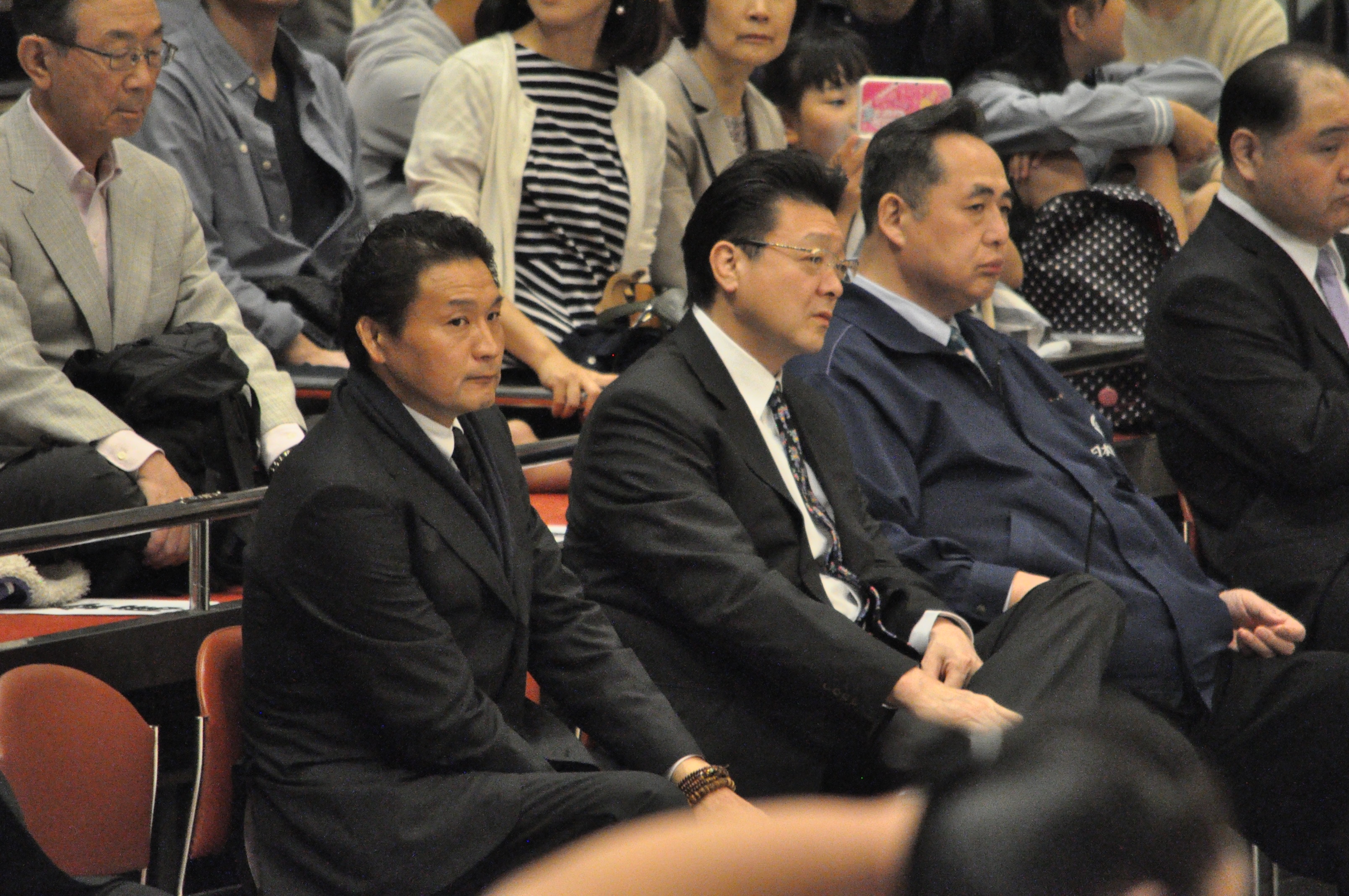
Oyakata Takanohana, Isegahama, Shibatayama and Oguruma watch the yokozuna keiko soken before the May tournament.

- 1: The banzuke for the May tournament is released. Two wrestlers make their top division debut: Ōnoshō from Onomatsu stable, and Yutakayama from Tokitsukaze stable. Onosho is the fifth wrestler to reach makuuchi from Onomatsu stable since it was founded in 1994. Yutakayama debuts in makuuchi a year after his stablemate Shodai. Both are former students of the Tokyo University of Agriculture. Yutakayama also makes history as the first ever sandanme tsukedashi to make his makuuchi debut. Chiyonokuni and Chiyoshoma of the Kokonoe stable reach their highest career ranks, at maegashira 1 and maegashira 2, respectively. Yoshikaze returns to sanyaku after seven tournaments. Hakuhō is ranked at yokozuna for the 59th time on the banzuke, level with Chiyonofuji and behind only Kitanoumi with 63.
- 24: Having failed to recover sufficiently from his upper body injuries sustained in the last tournament, Kisenosato withdraws after four losses in the first ten days. He had previously missed only one bout in his career, the last day of the January 2014 tournament.
- 28: Hakuhō wraps up his 38th yūshō (and first in a year) by defeating Harumafuji to claim his 13th zensho-yūshō or perfect score of 15 wins and no losses. Second place is shared by ōzeki Terunofuji and maegashira Tochinoshin on 12–3. Ōnoshō scores 10–5 in his top division debut and receives the Fighting Spirit Award. The Outstanding Performance Prize goes to komusubi Mitakeumi for defeating two yokozuna. The Technique Prize is shared between Yoshikaze and Takayasu, who with 11 wins in this tournament and a 34–11 record over the last three tournaments is virtually certain to be promoted to ōzeki. The jūryō division championship is won by Nishikigi with a score of 10–5 who defeats Aminishiki, denying the veteran the chance to win his first championship in any division at the age of 38. Another veteran, former maegashira Ōiwato, does claim his first makushita championship at the age of 36. Announcing their retirements are former sekiwake Asasekiryū and former maegashira Sadanofuji, who are staying in sumo as Nishikijima Oyakata and Nakamura Oyakata respectively.
- 31: Takayasu is formally promoted to ōzeki.

=== June ===
- 1: The Sumo Association announce that the Nagoya tournament in the year 2020 will start a week earlier than normal to avoid clashing with that year's Tokyo Summer Olympics which is scheduled to begin on July 24, 2020. The sumo will now conclude on July 19.
- 11: Ex-sekiwake Kyokutenhō takes over as the head coach of Tomozuna stable from former sekiwake Kaiki, as the latter has reached 65 years of age. The former Tomozuna is however re-hired by the Sumo Association as a consultant on reduced pay for five years, and is now known as Ōshima Oyakata.
- 25: The banzuke for the July tournament in Nagoya is released. There are no wrestlers making their top division debuts for the first time since May 2015, but Gagamaru, Chiyomaru, Sadanoumi and Nishikigi return, replacing Kaisei, Myogiryu, Toyohibiki and Yutakayama who are all demoted to juryo. With Takayasu's promotion there are four yokozuna and three ozeki on the banzuke for the first time since March 2000. Mitakeumi makes his debut at sekiwake. The sole new sekitori is Tobizaru (previously known by his family name of Iwasaki), while Abi returns to the juryo division.

=== July ===
- 23: The Nagoya tournament concludes with Hakuhō defeating Harumafuji to win his 39th yusho, his 14–1 record ensuring that he finishes one win ahead of rank-and filer Aoiyama on 13–2. During the basho Hakuhō established a new record of total career wins, surpassing both Chiyonofuji's 1045 and Kaiō's 1047. The record-breaking 1048th win came on Day 13 against new ozeki Takayasu. Aoiyama is runner-up for the first time in his career and wins the Fighting Spirit Award. The Outstanding Performance Prize goes to Mitakeumi, who was the only man to beat Hakuhō. The tournament sees a number of high-profile withdrawals due to injury, including yokozuna Kisenosato and Kakuryū, ozeki Terunofuji and maegashira Endō. The juryo division championship is won by Daiamami.
- 27: Isegahama Oyakata says that Harumafuji may need surgery on a left elbow injury and is likely to miss the Aki basho in September if that occurs. He also indicates that Terunofuji will miss the whole of the summer regional tour or jungyo as he continues to recover from knee surgery in May.
- The summer regional tour visits the following locations:
  - 30: Gifu, Gifu Prefecture
  - 31: Kusatsu, Shiga Prefecture

=== August ===
- The summer regional tour will visit the following locations:
  - 1: Toyota, Aichi Prefecture
  - 2: Toyama, Toyama Prefecture
  - 3: Shibata, Niigata Prefecture
  - 5: Sado, Niigata Prefecture
  - 6: Nagaoka, Niigata Prefecture
  - 7: Honjo, Saitama Prefecture
  - 8: Aoyama Gakuin, Tokyo Prefecture
  - 10: Hitachi, Ibaraki Prefecture
  - 11: Kaminoyama, Yamagata Prefecture
  - 12–13: Sendai, Miyagi Prefecture
  - 15: Aomori, Aomori Prefecture
  - 16: Itayanagi, Aomori Prefecture
  - 18: Eniwa, Hokkaido Prefecture
  - 19: Sapporo, Hokkaido Prefecture
  - 20: Asahikawa, Hokkaido Prefecture
  - 23–24: Odaiba, Tokyo Prefecture
  - 25: Odawara, Kanagawa Prefecture
  - 26: Tokorozawa, Saitama Prefecture
  - 27: KITTE, Tokyo Prefecture
- 10: Former juryo wrestler Dewaotori announces his retirement after 13 years in sumo.
- 22: The Russian sandanme wrestler Ōrora is announced as the heaviest ever rikishi in sumo, his weight recorded as 288 kg (635 lb) in the latest weigh-in conducted by the Sumo Association, surpassing Konishiki's peak weight of 285 kg (628 lb) in 1996.
- 28: The banzuke for the Aki basho is released. Yoshikaze becomes the fifth oldest post-WWII sekiwake at 35 years and 5 months. Asanoyama makes his makuuchi debut. He is the first wrestler from Takasago stable to be promoted to the top division since Asasekiryū in March 2003. He is also the first wrestler from Toyama Prefecture to be ranked in makuuchi since Kotogaume in January 1995. He is the second sandanme tsukedashi to reach the top division following Yutakayama, who returns to makuuchi for this tournament. There are two new sekitori: Yago from Oguruma stable (a former amateur champion at Chuo University) and Daiseidō from Kise stable.

=== September ===
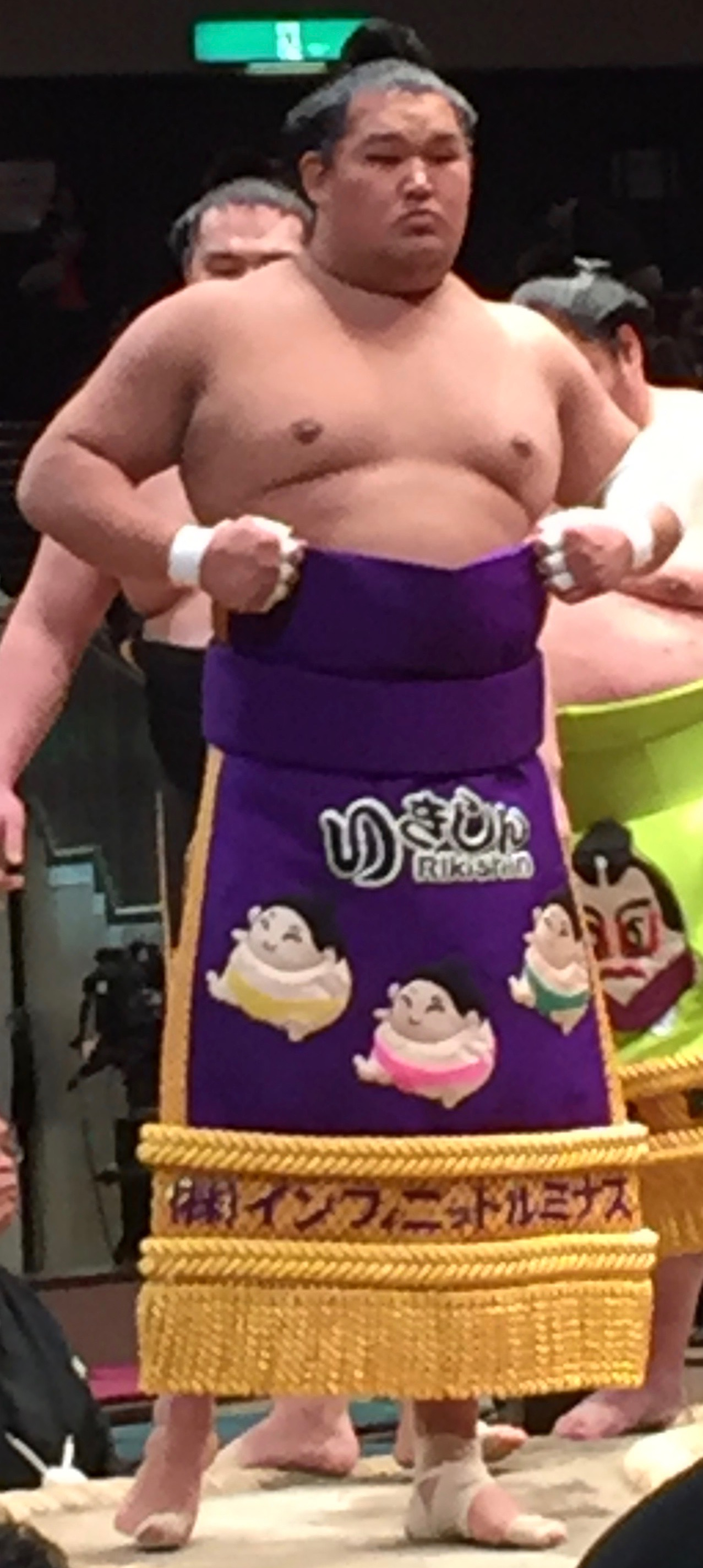
Former juryo Rikishin retired through injury at age 21 in September

- 7: It is announced that both Kisenosato and Kakuryū will skip the Aki basho as neither have fully recovered from their respective injuries. It is the first time since 1999 that two yokozuna have been absent from Day 1 of a tournament.
- 8: Hakuhō also announces that he is withdrawing due to a knee injury, making this the first tournament since the start of the Shōwa era that three yokozuna are out.
- 15: Terunofuji withdraws due to his knee injury, joining fellow ozeki Takayasu who pulled out on Day 3. It is the first time since the Summer tournament of 1918 that three yokozuna and two ozeki have been missing through injury.
- 24:The Aki basho ends with Harumafuji defeating Goeido in a playoff after both finish with 11–4 records. Goeido had been two wins ahead of the rest of the field on Day 11 but lost three of his last four bouts, with Harumafuji defeating him twice on the final day to win his ninth championship. He is only the third wrestler to win a top division championship with a mere 11–4 record following Tochiazuma in 1972 and Musashimaru in 1996. Makuuchi debutant Asanoyama wins the Fighting Spirit Award after a fine 10–5 record. He shares the prize with Onosho who becomes the first man to secure double-digit winning records in his first three top division tournaments in the modern era. The Technique Award goes to Yoshikaze for the fourth time. The Outstanding Performance Award is won by Takakeisho for defeating both Harumafuji and Goeido. The juryo championship is won by Abi with a 10–5 record after a four-way playoff that also involved Kotoyuki (who Abi beat earlier in the day as well), Aminishiki and Homarefuji. The makushita division championship is won by former maegashira Kagamio with a prefect 7–0 record. Two former juryo wrestlers, Wakanoshima and Rikishin announce their retirements. Wakanoshima is a 32 year old veteran with 17 years in sumo but Rikishin is just 21 years old and has failed to recover from recent knee surgery.

=== October ===
- 2: Kisenosato wins the All Japan Rikishi Tournament, a knock-out exhibition at the Kokugikan, for the second year in a row. He defeats Takekaze in the final. The jūryō tournament is held by Seiro.
- 4: The second Ozumo Beyond 2020 Basho, an exhibition aimed at foreign fans ahead of the 2020 Summer Olympics, is held at the Kokugikan. At its conclusion Hakuhō is presented with an award (an artwork of Japanese calligraphy) from the Yokozuna Deliberation Council to mark his achievement of breaking the all-time career wins record with his 1048th victory in July.
- The autumn regional tour will visit the following locations:
  - 5: Yachiyo, Chiba
  - 6: Yokohama, Kanagawa
  - 7: Saitama, Saitama
  - 8: Fuji, Shizuoka
  - 9: Chikusei, Ibaraki
  - 11: Hamamatsu, Shizuoka
  - 12: Ichinomiya, Aichi
  - 13: Nagano, Nagano
  - 14: Kanazawa, Ishikawa
  - 15: Kyoto, Kyoto
  - 17: Takayama, Gifu
  - 18: Tsu, Mie
  - 19: Kashiba, Nara
  - 20: Hirakata, Osaka
  - 21: Kishiwada, Osaka
  - 22: Osaka, Osaka
  - 24: Okayama, Okayama
  - 25: Yabu, Hyogo
  - 26: Tottori, Tottori
  - 27: Matsue, Shimane
  - 28: Hiroshima, Hiroshima
  - 29: Fukuyama, Hiroshima
- 30: The banzuke for the November tournament is released. Harumafuji occupies the top position of Yokozuna 1 East for the first time in six tournaments. His Isegahama stablemate Aminishiki also has a reason to celebrate as he is promoted back to makuuchi after an eight tournament absence. At 39 years old he is the oldest man to be promoted to the top division since the beginning of the Shōwa era in 1926. Terunofuji is demoted to sekiwake, while Onosho makes his debut at komusubi. The only newcomer to the top division is Daiamami, a Nihon University graduate. Making his juryo debut is Takanosho, formerly Masunosho, of Chiganoura stable. He is first wrestler from the stable since Masunoyama in 2010 to become a sekitori.

=== November ===
Harumafuji

- 8: Kakuryū's stablemaster Izutsu Oyakata says the yokozuna will miss the Kyūshū tournament because he has been experiencing lower back pain in addition to his previously known right leg problem. It is the fifth time this year that he has missed at least some of a tournament, and the second in a row that he will sit out entirely. Izutsu says "It would be irresponsible to compete in his current condition. We're terribly sorry."
- 14: Harumafuji withdraws from the tournament on Day 3, on the same day as reports emerge he assaulted fellow Mongolian Takanoiwa with a beer bottle during the regional tour stop in Tottori on October 26. Takanoiwa pulled out ahead of this tournament with a medical certificate citing concussion and a skull base fracture. It was alleged that Harumafuji had been drinking and struck Takanoiwa because "he did not like his attitude." Takanohana, Takanoiwa's stablemaster, has reported the incident to the police, and the Sumo Association are also investigating. Harumafuji told reporters after a morning training session in Dazaifu, "as for Takanoiwa's injuries, I apologise deeply for causing trouble for stable master Takanohana, people affiliated with Takanohana stable, the Sumo Association and my stable master." He visited the Fukuoka base of the Takanohana stable with his stablemaster, Isegahama Oyakata, but was unable to make a direct apology as Takanohana and Takanoiwa were absent.
- 22: Takanohana refuses to allow the Sumo Association access to Takanoiwa, saying the matter must be left to police.
- 25: Hakuhō's 40th championship is assured when, having seen his two closest pursuers Okinoumi and Hokutofuji both lose, he defeats Endō to move to an unassailable two win lead on 13–1.
- 26: Hakuhō wraps up the tournament by defeating Goeidō (the only other yokozuna or ozeki to complete the whole 15 days) to finish on 14–1, three wins ahead of maegashira Okinoumi, Hokutofuji, Tamawashi and Takakeisho, who all finish on 11–4. It is the first time four maegashira have been runner-up in a single tournament. The Outstanding Performance prize goes to Takakeisho for defeating two yokozuna (Hakuhō's only defeat was to Yoshikaze who was ineligible for a special prize as he failed to get a majority of wins), Hokutofuji wins the Technique Prize, and the Fighting Spirit Award is shared between Okinoumi and Aminishiki. The juryo division championship is won by Sokokurai with a 14–1 record, while Tochihiryu wins the makushita championship.
- 27: Takanohana, whose decision to report Harumafuji's alleged assault to police and refusal to co-operate with investigators has attracted criticism, reportedly tells supporters at a post-basho party that as head of the regional tour department he had a "responsibility to seek justice" no matter who the wrestler was, and that Takanoiwa's injuries are serious. Meanwhile, Hakuhō says that he wants to see both Harumafuji and Takanoiwa back on the dohyo as soon as possible, and that he will tell police exactly what he saw in order to rid the sumo world of "the pus."
- 27: The Yokozuna Deliberation Council calls for "extremely harsh punishment" of Harumafuji, which could entail suspension from tournaments, a recommendation to retire, or dismissal.
- 28: Japan Sumo Association chairman Hakkaku Oyakata apologises to Daichi Suzuki of the Japan Sport Agency for the Harumafuji assault scandal.
- 29: Harumafuji announces his retirement at a press conference. He does not go into details about the alleged assault on Takanoiwa, but says, "I had heard that he was lacking in manners and civility and thought it was my duty as a senior wrestler to correct and teach him. But I went too far." His stablemaster says that Harumafuji has "caused great trouble" for the Sumo Association and sumo fans, and as a yokozuna he must take responsibility.
- 30: An interim report issued by the Sumo Association's investigative committee says that the October 25 incident occurred at a party to celebrate graduates of Tottori Jōhoku High School, which include Terunofuji and Takanoiwa. The three Mongolian yokozuna, Harumafuji, Kakuryu and Hakuho were all present. Hakuho criticized Takanoiwa for previous disrespectful behavior at a restaurant in September. After the group moved on to another bar to continue drinking, Hakuho lectured Takanoiwa and Terunofuji on how they must never forget what they learned in their school days. Harumafuji told Takanoiwa to pay attention, at which point Takanoiwa, who was looking at his mobile phone, grinned and said he had just received an e-mail from his girlfriend. Infuriated, Harumafuji slapped Takanoiwa several times around the face to get him to apologize to Hakuho and when Takanoiwa refused to do so, grabbed a karaoke machine remote control and hit Takanoiwa over the head with it several times, which eventually required stitches. The report says that the beer bottle widely cited in early media reports was in fact a champagne bottle which slipped out of Harumafuji's hands before he could use it to hit Takanoiwa.

=== December ===
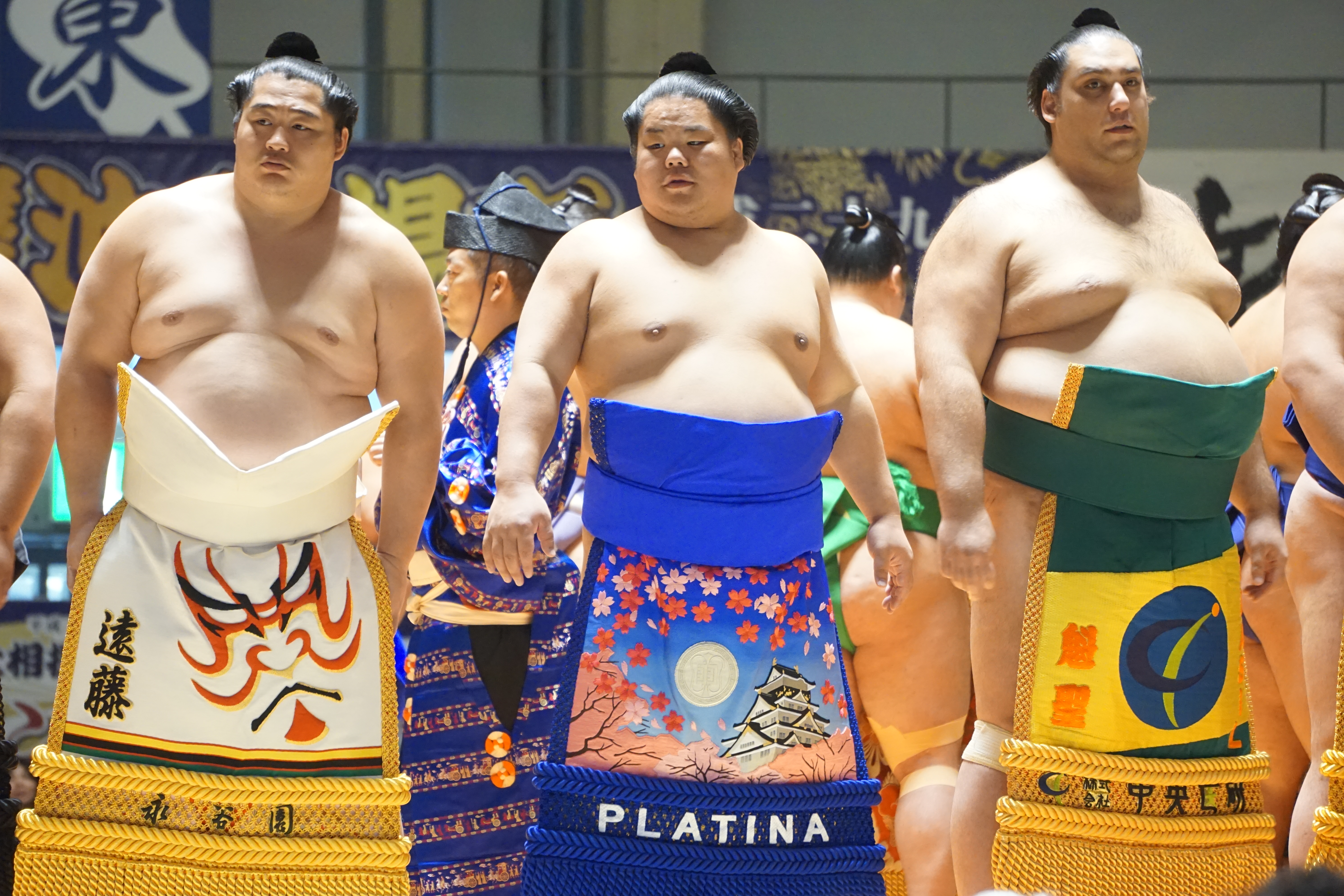
From the winter tour in Ginowan, Okinawa, Dec 17

- 1: Hakuhō and his stablemaster Miyagino are severely reprimanded by the Sumo Association for Hakuhō's inappropriate behavior during his yūshō interview, when he called for Harumafuji and Takanoiwa to return to the ring and led the crowd in "banzai" cheers.
- The winter tour visits the following locations:
  - 3: Omura, Nagasaki
  - 4: Goto, Nagasaki
  - 6: Nogata, Fukuoka
  - 7: Usa, Oita
  - 8: Miyazaki, Miyazaki
  - 9: Kumamoto, Kumamoto
  - 10: Kagoshima, Kagoshima
  - 11: Kitakyushu, Fukuoka
  - 13-14: Miyakojima, Okinawa
  - 16-17: Ginowan, Okinawa
- 11: Tottori police conclude their investigation and turn the case over to prosecutors. Harumafuji's lawyers respond to criticism that he did not directly apologize to Takanoiwa during his retirement press conference by saying that Harumafuji was nervous, and "wholeheartedly offer an apology to all on (our client's) behalf."
- 20: Hakuhō and Kakuryū are docked one and half month's and one month's salary respectively by the Sumo Association and criticized for not doing enough to prevent the beating incident at which both were present. The Sumo Association also accepts the resignation of Isegahama as a director, and reveals that Takanoiwa finally spoke to the crisis committee investigating the affair on December 19, but the wrestler said that he did nothing discourteous that would cause Harumafuji to attack him. Chairman Hakkaku is also foregoing his salary for the last three months of his term.
- 28: Harumafuji is given a summary indictment over the Takanoiwa assault, meaning he is likely to be fined rather than face a court trial. An emergency meeting of the Sumo Association's board of directors recommends that Takanohana be dismissed as a director and demoted two rungs in the hierarchy, to take responsibility for the Takanoiwa incident which occurred under his watch as regional tour director. The recommendation must be formalized at another meeting on January 4.

== Deaths ==
- Jan 25: Former makushita 37 Musashiumi, also a pro wrestler, aged 51, of a heart attack.
- Jan 31: Former komusubi Tokitenku (see January entry)
- Apr 27: Former yokozuna Sadanoyama, aged 79, of pneumonia. (see April entry)
- Sep 22: Former maegashira Asasegawa, also former Urakaze Oyakata, aged 75.

== See also ==
- Glossary of sumo terms
- List of active sumo wrestlers
- List of years in sumo
