= Onomatsu =

Ōnomatsu is the name of:

- the sixth yokozuna in the sport of sumo Ōnomatsu Midorinosuke
- the sumo stable Ōnomatsu stable currently run by former sekiwake Masurao
- the elder name normally associated with the above stable
