= Daidō Kenji =

Sumo wrestler

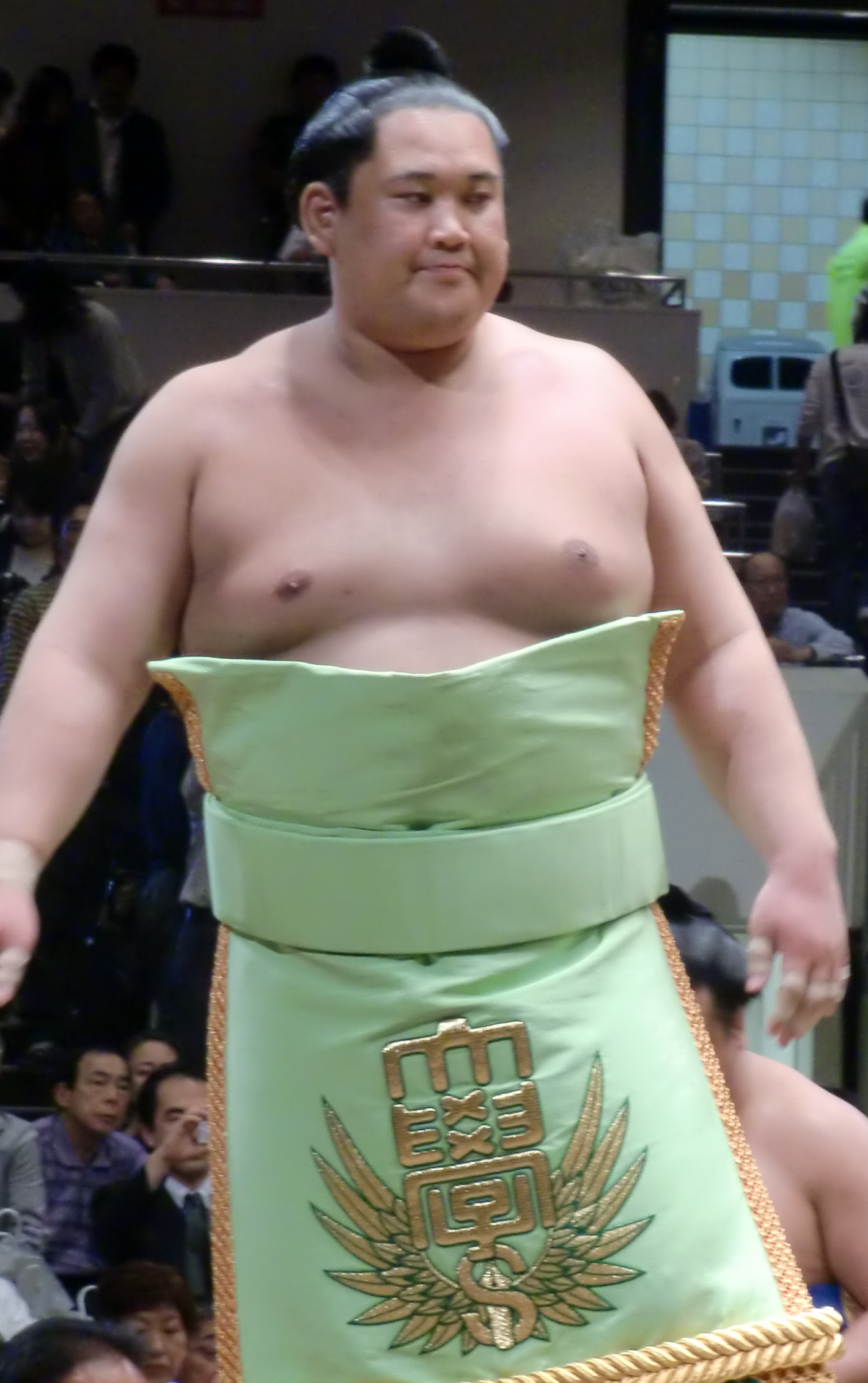

Personal information
- Native name: 大道 健二
- Born: Kenji Nakanishi; August 21, 1982 (age 44) Katsushika, Tokyo, Japan
- Height: 1.87 m (6 ft 1 1/2 in)
- Weight: 169 kg (373 lb; 26.6 st)

Sport
- Sport: Sumo
- University team: Senshu University
- Retired: January, 2016
- Heya: Onomatsu
- Record: 347-333-23
- Debut: March, 2005
- Highest rank: Maegashira 8 (September, 2012)
- Elder name: Onomatsu
- Championships: 1 (Jonidan); 1 (Jonokuchi)
- Updated on April 13, 2016

Daidō Kenji (大道 健二) (born August 21, 1982 as Kenji Nakanishi) is a former professional sumo wrestler (rikishi) from Katsushika, Tokyo, Japan. He made his debut in 2005, reaching the top division six years later, debuting in the July, 2011 tournament. His highest rank was maegashira #8. He is now a sumo coach.

== Early life and sumo background ==
At the behest of his older sister, Nakanishi started participating in a sumo club in his neighborhood from 4th grade. He later participated in inter-high school tournaments. As a student at Senshu University he won the open weight division championship. Upon graduating he joined Onomatsu stable and entered the professional sumo ring in March 2005.

== Professional career ==
Nakanishi had a relatively trouble-free rise through the lower ranks. He took a 7-0 championship in both the jonokuchi and jonidan divisions in his first and second tournaments. He continued to make steady forward progress for the following year, reaching makushita #10 in late 2006. For the next two years he would compete in the mid to high level makushita ranks, landing at makushita #28 in July 2008 after a year long run of 3-4 and 4-3 finishes. From this point he would manage a three year long streak with no losing records and fifteen winning records that would propel him into the top division. The streak was interrupted by a broken jaw that would force him to sit out the March 2009 tournament and fall from makushita #5 to makushita #45, but he stormed into jūryō on the back of five consecutive winning tournaments, including a runner-up finish to Akiseyama after winning the first two bouts of an eight-way playoff for the July 2009 championship.

As is often the custom, he chose his entry into jūryō to change his ring name from his family name to his current ring name of Daidō. The name he said comes from what he sees as the starting place of his way of sumo, his old junior high school, which is named Daidō. He entered the second tier jūryō division at the same time as Onomatsu stablemate Masuraumi in March 2010. This was the first time that two wrestlers from the same stable had been promoted to jūryō simultaneously since Kimurayama and Tochinoshin from Kasugano stable were promoted in January 2008. Daidō was the third wrestler from Senshu University to achieve sekitori status, following already retired Musoyama and Katayama, the latter of whom was also from the same stable.

He made a smooth entry into jūryō posting two consecutive winning tournaments of 9-6 and 10-5. However, in the wake of an investigation by the national police into illegal baseball gambling by sumo wrestlers, Daidō was one of many wrestlers who admitted involvement. As punishment by the JSA Daidō was compelled to sit out the July 2010 tournament. This tournament would have been his highest rank yet at jūryō #2. This was an ironic repeat of his "debut" in the top ranks of makushita in 2009 where his injury had forced him to sit out. As another stipulation of the punishment, Daidō and others implicated were demoted by one division in the following September tournament. This would put Daidō back to makushita #1. He would manage a 4-3 winning record in this tournament and return to jūryō in the November tournament. He achieved three consecutive winning tournaments, interrupted only by the March tournament that was cancelled due to match fixing allegations. During this period, in the ongoing police investigation into baseball gambling, Daidō was implicated as one of four still active wrestlers who had used a gambling ring operated by then active sumo wrestlers from Onomatsu stable to place bets on baseball. The prosecutor recommended charges, but ultimately no indictments were handed down due to lack of compelling evidence.

Daidō's performance was largely unaffected by the turmoil around the allegations and his successful tournaments earned him promotion to the top tier makuuchi division in July 2011. Over the next two years he competed in thirteen basho at the top division, highlighted by a 10-5 finish in July 2012 to move up to maegashira #8 for two tournaments. After a 1–14 finish in the July 2013 tournament he was demoted back to the jūryō division, where he mostly stayed for his final two and half years as a competitor.

== Retirement from sumo ==
Daidō dropped out of jūryō after the July 2015 tournament, and although he managed an immediate return, a 6-9 performance in November 2015 followed by a 1-4 start at makushita 2 in January 2016 motivated him to retire. He remained in the sumo world as a coach at his stable, under the elder name of Onogawa Oyakata. His danpatsu-shiki, or official retirement ceremony was held on June 4, 2016 at the Ryogoku Kokugikan with 480 people in attendance. He revealed at the event that he has been married since December 2014.

In January 2018, he became the owner of the Otowayama kabu, replacing ex-Otowayama Oyakata Kōbō, who had it on loan and left the Japan Sumo Association. In September 2019 he became the new Onomatsu Oyakata and head of the Onomatsu stable, swapping with ex-sekiwake Masurao who left the Sumo Association for health reasons.

== Fighting style ==
Daidō preferred to fight on the opponent's mawashi or belt as opposed to pushing or thrusting. His favoured grip was migi-yotsu, with his left hand outside and right hand inside in his opponent's arms. His most common winning kimarite was uwatenage, or overarm throw, followed by yori-kiri or force out.

== Career record ==
Daidō Kenji
Year	January Hatsu basho, Tokyo	March Haru basho, Osaka	May Natsu basho, Tokyo	July Nagoya basho, Nagoya	September Aki basho, Tokyo	November Kyūshū basho, Fukuoka
2005	x	(Maezumo)	West Jonokuchi #14; 7–0; Champion	East Jonidan #21; 7–0–PP; Champion	East Sandanme #27; 4–3	West Sandanme #15; 2–5
2006	East Sandanme #39; 6–1	East Makushita #54; 6–1	West Makushita #24; 5–2	East Makushita #14; 4–3	West Makushita #10; 3–4	East Makushita #16; 2–5
2007	East Makushita #33; 4–3	West Makushita #26; 5–2	West Makushita #15; 5–2	East Makushita #7; 3–4	East Makushita #10; 4–3	West Makushita #6; 3–4
2008	East Makushita #11; 3–4	East Makushita #16; 3–4	West Makushita #21; 3–4	East Makushita #28; 5–2	West Makushita #18; 4–3	East Makushita #11; 4–3
2009	West Makushita #7; 4–3	West Makushita #5; Sat out due to injury 0–0–7	West Makushita #45; 5–2	West Makushita #27; 6–1–PPP	West Makushita #9; 5–2	East Makushita #5; 4–3
2010	West Makushita #3; 4–3	West Jūryō #14; 9–6	East Jūryō #8; 10–5	West Jūryō #2; Sat out due to injury 0–0–15	West Makushita #1; 4–3	West Jūryō #12; 9–6
2011	West Jūryō #8; 9–6	Tournament Cancelled; 0–0–0	East Jūryō #4; 8–7	East Maegashira #12; 6–9	East Maegashira #15; 8–7	East Maegashira #12; 8–7
2012	West Maegashira #9; 6–9	East Maegashira #12; 7–8	West Maegashira #12; 7–8	East Maegashira #13; 10–5	East Maegashira #8; 7–8	West Maegashira #8; 5–10
2013	East Maegashira #13; 6–9	East Maegashira #15; 8–7	East Maegashira #13; 8–7	East Maegashira #11; 1–14	East Jūryō #2; 6–9	West Jūryō #10; 9–6
2014	West Jūryō #6; 8–7	East Jūryō #5; 8–7	West Jūryō #1; 3–12	East Jūryō #10; 6–9	East Jūryō #12; 8–7	East Jūryō #8; 9–6
2015	West Jūryō #3; 6–9	East Jūryō #5; 6–9	West Jūryō #8; 6–9	East Jūryō #11; 4–11	East Makushita #3; 5–2	West Jūryō #13; 6–9
2016	West Makushita #2; Retired; 1–4–1	x	x	x	x	x
Record given as wins–losses–absences Top division champion Top division runner-up Retired Lower divisions Non-participation Sanshō key: F=Fighting spirit; O=Outstanding performance; T=Technique Also shown: ★=Kinboshi; P=Playoff(s); Divisions: Makuuchi — Jūryō — Makushita — Sandanme — Jonidan — Jonokuchi Makuuchi ranks: Yokozuna — Ōzeki — Sekiwake — Komusubi — Maegashira

== See also ==
- Glossary of sumo terms
- List of past sumo wrestlers
- List of sumo elders
