= Horse ointment =

Skin care product for humans

Horse ointment, known as horse oil and horse fat, is a topical formulation derived from subcutaneous fat of horses. Due to its thickness and viscosity, horse ointment is intended for topical use on human skin and mucous membranes to moisturize and increase the restoration of damaged skin. Horse ointment was traditionally prepared and used in ancient China for the treatment of qi deficiency, hemorrhoids, burns, and xeroderma. Due to the amount of fatty acids in horse ointment, which is similar to that of human skin fat, it can penetrate through the surface of skin. Nowadays, it is commonly applied to skin for the purpose of soothing redness and irritation. It is considered a natural skincare product with low risks of sensitization and irritation and is safe for people of all ages, including infants and seniors.

== Production ==
The extraction of horse oil is a process that requires the use of large-scale machines. Horse fatty tissues are first ground with a meat grinder and then mixed with water. In order to render horse oils, horse fat is first extracted in a vacuum system at a temperature between 60 and 110 °C. Rendered horse oil is then collected, filtered, and neutralized with 0.2% sodium hydroxide. Afterwards, it transferred to a stainless steel container in a water bath at 100 °C for 30 minutes for the precipitation of impurities. Modern manufacturing of horse ointment usually involves purification to remove the odor of horse oil, which enables it to be a cosmetic product widely used nowadays.

== Composition and chemistry ==
A typical high-purity grade of horse ointment is composed predominantly of unsaturated acids. Compared to saturated acids, unsaturated acids are more suitable for skin applications. Two substances in horse ointments have a larger influence on its impact on skin, namely alphalinolenic acid and linoleic acid. Alphalinolenic acid is an omega-3 fatty acid that exerts anti-inflammatory effects, while linolenic acid is an omega-6 fatty acid that moisturizes the skin and reduces inflammatory mediators. In addition to its effects on skin, a recent study discovered that horse ointments could also protect against oxidative stress. Experimental results showed that horse ointments absorb UVB radiation and remove reactive oxygen species, thus protecting human HaCaT keratinocytes from UVB-induced oxidative stress and preventing cell structural damage, skin necrosis, and aging.

== Cosmetic use ==
=== Preventing acne and fading scars ===
Horse ointment contains vitamin F, which exerts a natural anti-inflammatory effect and prevents flare-ups of acne. It can also increase the repairing of damaged skin cells and speed up the fading of scars.

=== Reducing pore size ===
Some horse ointment formulas contain natural moisturizers extracted from plants, such as rosemary, horsetail, hops, pine, and lemon. These natural moisturizers are able to repair skin, which is a necessary property for increasing skin metabolism, maintaining skin health, as well as reducing pore size.

=== Hydration of skin ===
Horse ointment contains coenzyme Q10, hyaluronic acid, and collagen, which can maintain the natural moisture barrier of the skin to prevent its water loss. Oleic acid and sea shark essence in horse oil disturbs the natural lipid bilayer of the cuticle and allows penetration into the skin.

=== Reduction of formation of spots and wrinkles ===
Horse oil contains sophorolipids and natural ingredients such as horsetail and pine hops, which promote the synthesis of collagen in the skin and thus maintain elasticity and prevent wrinkle formation.

=== Promotion of hair growth ===
Liposomes in horse oil stimulate hair follicles to enter the anagen phase of the hair growth cycle, thus shortening the time for hair growth.

== Studies on horse ointments ==
Horse oil is one of the most common natural moisturizing ingredients in cosmetic products in Asian countries. It has been claimed to have antibacterial, anti-inflammatory, and antipruritic effects on the skin. However, most studies related to the efficacy of horse oil are written in Japanese or Korean without any English translations, thus making it difficult for dermatologists to analyze and discuss the findings.

== Ethical concerns ==
Horse oil is extracted from a mixture of fat from the manes, tail root, and abdomens of horses in alpine regions, which raises ethical concerns. Some vegetarians and animal-rights activists hold firm to the belief that using horses for the production of horse ointment is cruel and unsustainable.

== Market value ==
After refining, horse oil is a raw material for the production of high-end cosmetics that can be exchanged in the market. The development and production of horse oil ointment and other associated cosmetic products has extended the chain of horse product development, increasing the output value each year. Horse ointment is now widely produced, although it is mainly produced in the Kyushu area.
