= UVB-induced apoptosis =

Programmed death of UV-damaged cells

UVB-induced apoptosis is the programmed cell death of cells that become damaged by ultraviolet rays. This is notable in skin cells, to prevent melanoma. Some studies have shown that exercise accelerates this process.

== Description ==
Apoptosis is a physiological process, that promotes the active suicide of cells, resulting in an advantage, unlike necrosis which occurs from trauma. In the average human adult it is estimated that 50 to 70 billion cells die each day from apoptosis. One of the largest promoters of apoptosis is exposure to ultraviolet (UV) light. While UV light is essential to human life it can also cause harm by inducing cancer, immunosuppression, photoaging, inflammation, and cell death.

Of the various components of sunlight, ultraviolet radiation B (UVB) (290-320 nm) is considered to be the most harmful. This type of radiation acts primarily on the epidermis, and in particular the keratinocytes. Keratinocytes are known to form a barrier to provide a layer of protection within the skin against environmental hazards. Within the epidermis, in addition to the keratinocytes, there are melanocytes (melanin producing cells). These cells produce pigment that provides the keratinocytes with protection against UVB radiation. Once the keratinocytes have been damaged irreparably as a result of UVB radiation, they are marked for destruction by apoptosis to eliminate them as they are potentially mutagenic cells. Failure of the body to remove DNA damaged cells increases the risk of skin cancer.

One consequence of acute UVB exposure is the occurrence of sunburn cells, keratinocytes, within the epidermis. It has been found that when exposed to UVB radiation the DNA in an epidermis cell undergoes fragmentation, which could result in the growth of tumor cells. To prevent this the cell undergoes a morphological change into keratinocytes. These keratinocytes exhibit the capacity to release TNF-α (tumor necrosis factor - alpha) that stop the growth of the tumor by promoting the death of the cell.

If keratinocyte cells have been damaged by UVB radiation, the term "sunburn cell" or "SBC formation" is used. It is thought that when keratinocytes have been damaged by UVB radiation, this triggers a series of processes, caused in part by damage to the DNA. A study indicates that it may be at the mitochondria where the various processes (ligan-dependent receptor activation and cytosolic signaling) pathways are activated by the production of reactive oxygen species (ROS) that may direct the destruction of keratinocytes through apoptosis by activating caspase. As a result of increased exposure to an oxygen-reduced environment, this promotes the development of ROS thereby linking the incidence of ROS with keratinocytes and making these cells more sensitive to UVB radiation. A study by Tobi et al., in 2002 has linked ROS with cytotoxicity, apoptosis, mutations, and carcinogenesis. Mild hypoxia (1-5%) sensitized keratinocytes to UVB-induced apoptosis, while protecting melanocytes from environmental stresses.

A study by Mark Schotanus, et al., has demonstrated that in addition to potential damage to keratinocytes and melanocytes, exposure to UVB radiation may also produce a loss of potassium ions, which may then cause the activation of apoptotic pathways in lymphocytes and neuronal cells as opposed to keratinocytes and melanocytes. It has been demonstrated that incubation of lymphocytes and neuronal cells in elevated concentrations of potassium ions provides protection from apoptosis. This phenomenon was demonstrated in tears, which have higher levels of potassium ions, and bathe cells of the eye and therefore provides protection from UVB radiation. Reduction of potassium ions promotes apoptosis and the synthesis of initiator caspase-8 and the effector caspase-3.

A study reported in the International Journal of Molecular Sciences in 2012; 13(3), pages 2560-2675, published February 28, 2012 by Terrerence J. Piva, Catherine M. Davern, Paula M. Hall, Clay M. Winterford and Kay A.O. Ellem, that while caspase may play a role in apoptosis, it is specifically not as a result of caspase-3. It was reported in that study that the process of apoptosis includes: "detachment from the substrate, followed by loss of specialized membrane structures such as microvilli. The cell then undergoes rounding, shrinkage and blabbing before condensation of chromatin is observed in the nucleus. After a period of time the cell fragments into apoptotic bodies, which in vivo are engulfed and degraded by phagocytic cells such as macrophages" Caspase I is involved in the aforementioned cell membrane activity but not caspase-3.

== UVB-induced apoptosis pathway ==
The sequence of events that leads to apoptosis is multifaceted and complex. Despite the simple concept of apoptosis, the sequence of events that leads to it and other conditions that attempt to counter act it can be very cumbersome. Since apoptosis is a last resort alternative, it takes the initiation of multiple other genes (ING2, p53, or Ras subfamily) expressed before the cell is finally programmed for death. In addition, genes like Survivin can attempt to suppress apoptosis.
