= Masurao Hiroo =

Japanese former sumo wrestler (born 1961)

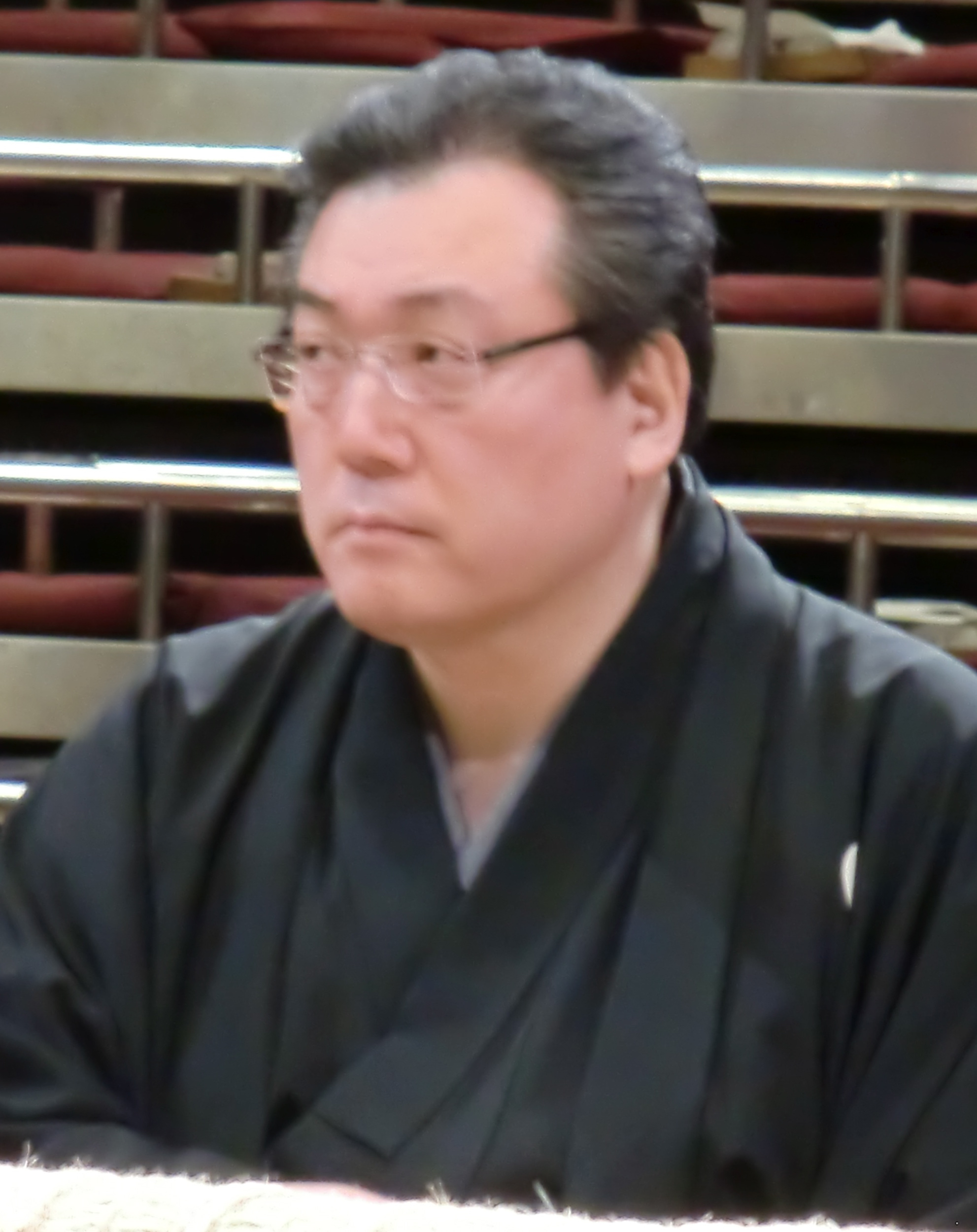

Personal information
- Native name: 益荒雄 広生
- Born: Hiroo Teshima; 27 June 1961 (age 65) Fukuoka, Japan
- Height: 1.88 m (6 ft 2 in)
- Weight: 126 kg (278 lb)

Sport
- Sport: Sumo
- Retired: July, 1990
- Heya: Oshiogawa
- Record: 387-321-86
- Debut: March, 1979
- Highest rank: Sekiwake (July, 1987)
- Elder name: Ōnomatsu
- Championships: 5 (Jūryō)
- Special Prizes: Outstanding Performance (2); Fighting Spirit (2); Technique (1)
- Gold Stars: 2 (Futahaguro, Hokutoumi)
- Updated on May 2008

Masurao Hiroo (益荒雄広生; born June 27, 1961) is a Japanese former sumo wrestler, born Hiroo Teshima (手島 広生, Teshima Hiroo) in Itoda, Fukuoka Prefecture. Making his professional debut in 1979, he reached the top division in 1985. His highest rank was sekiwake and he won five special prizes in his top division career. He was one of the lightest wrestlers in the top division, and very popular with tournament crowds. In his later career he suffered from a number of injuries, particularly to his knee, and he retired in 1990 at the age of 29. He was the head coach of Ōnomatsu stable and a director of the Japan Sumo Association until 2019 when he left for health reasons.

== Career ==
In his youth he excelled at judo but was persuaded to give sumo a try by Oshiogawa-oyakata, the former ōzeki Daikirin. He entered sumo after his second year of high school, and fought his first match, under the name Tejima, at age 17 in the March tournament of 1979. In 1985 he entered the makuuchi ranks, having already taken the name Masurao. He won his first special prize in November 1986, and his first kinboshi in January 1987.

The March tournament of 1987 saw Masurao ranked in the titled san'yaku ranks for the first time, at komusubi. In the first seven days he defeated two yokozuna (Chiyonofuji and Futahaguro) and four ōzeki (Hokuten'yū, future yokozuna Ōnokuni, Asashio, and Wakashimazu). Despite these six victories over higher-ranked opponents, he began losing in the second week and ended the tournament with a 9–6 record. In the next basho in May he beat two more yokozuna (Chiyonofuji and, for the third time in a row, Futahaguro) and two more ōzeki and scored 10–5. He then advanced to sekiwake, the highest rank he attained. However he finished the July 1987 tournament with a 4–11 record and never made san'yaku again. In the following September tournament he injured his knee in a bout with Ōnokuni and was forced to withdraw, falling to the bottom of the division. In May 1988 he injured the knee again in a bout with another heavyweight, Konishiki, and ended up dropping out of that tournament too. His knee continued to trouble him for the rest of his career, and he was demoted to the second jūryō division on several occasions. He ended up winning the jūryō division championship five times, which is a record.

Masurao retired from wrestling in July 1990 at the age of just 29. He left a record of 387 wins, 329 losses, missing 86 bouts. His career spanned eleven years and 68 tournaments, 20 in the makuuchi division, where his record was 111-125-64. He received several honors: the shukun-shō twice, the kantō-shō twice, and the ginō-shō once. He was known as the "White Wolf," after Chiyonofuji who was nicknamed "Wolf."

He has the fewest tournaments in the top division of any sekiwake since the introduction of the six tournaments per year system in 1958.

== Fighting style ==
Masurao was a yotsu-sumo wrestler, favouring grappling and throwing rather than pushing techniques. His favourite grip on his opponent's mawashi was migi-yotsu, a left hand outside, right hand inside grip. Aside from yori-kiri, or force out, he also regularly used sukuinage, the scoop throw, and shitatenage, the underarm throw.

== After retirement ==
After leaving the ring, Masurao remained in sumo. He became head of the Ōnomatsu stable, which he founded in 1994. He produced five makuuchi wrestlers, Katayama, Wakakōyū, Daidō, Amūru and Ōnoshō. He was forced to leave the Nishonoseki ichimon or group of stables in January 2010 after declaring his support for Takanohana's unsanctioned bid to be elected to the board of directors of the Sumo Association. After Takanohana's group formed its own ichimon in 2014, he was selected as their candidate for director in the 2018 elections and won a seat on the board in February 2018. He was also the chief of the judging department. After the May 2019 tournament he was criticized by the chairman of the Yokozuna Deliberation Council for giving confusing explanations of the judges' conference to the audience after the Asanoyama-Sadanoumi match on Day 11 and the Asanoyama-Tochinoshin match on Day 13. He withdrew from judging duties for the next two tournaments, citing high blood pressure. On 26 September 2019 it was announced that he was leaving the Japan Sumo Association for health reasons, being replaced as head of the Ōnomatsu stable by Otowayama-oyakata, the former maegashira Daidō.

== Career record ==
Masurao Hiroo
Year	January Hatsu basho, Tokyo	March Haru basho, Osaka	May Natsu basho, Tokyo	July Nagoya basho, Nagoya	September Aki basho, Tokyo	November Kyūshū basho, Fukuoka
1979	x	(Maezumo)	East Jonokuchi #8; 6–1	West Jonidan #54; Sat out due to injury 0–0–7	West Jonidan #108; 6–1	West Jonidan #43; 5–2
1980	East Jonidan #6; 4–3	West Sandanme #78; 5–2	West Sandanme #46; 3–4	West Sandanme #59; 4–3	East Sandanme #40; 4–3	West Sandanme #20; 3–4
1981	West Sandanme #33; 4–3	West Sandanme #20; 4–3	East Sandanme #6; 3–4	West Sandanme #16; 4–3	West Sandanme #3; 5–2	East Makushita #44; 4–3
1982	West Makushita #30; 3–4	East Makushita #41; 5–2	East Makushita #25; 4–3	East Makushita #20; 4–3	East Makushita #14; 4–3	East Makushita #12; 6–1–P
1983	East Makushita #2; 4–3	East Makushita #1; 3–4	East Makushita #5; 5–2	West Jūryō #13; 10–5–P	East Jūryō #8; 8–7	East Jūryō #5; 5–10
1984	West Jūryō #8; 8–7	West Jūryō #4; 6–9	East Jūryō #9; 7–8	West Jūryō #10; 8–7	East Jūryō #7; 2–13	West Makushita #7; 6–1
1985	East Makushita #1; 5–2	East Jūryō #10; 8–7	West Jūryō #8; 11–4	East Jūryō #4; 10–5–PP; Champion	East Maegashira #14; 7–8	West Jūryō #2; 10–5–P
1986	East Maegashira #14; 5–10	West Jūryō #4; 11–4; Champion	East Maegashira #13; 6–6–3	West Jūryō #2; Sat out due to injury 0–0–15	West Jūryō #2; 9–6	West Maegashira #13; 11–4; F
1987	East Maegashira #4; 8–7; T★	East Komusubi #1; 9–6; O	East Komusubi #1; 10–5; O	West Sekiwake #1; 4–11	West Maegashira #3; 1–3–11	West Maegashira #13; Sat out due to injury 0–0–15
1988	West Maegashira #13; 9–6	East Maegashira #6; 9–6	West Maegashira #1; 2–6–7	West Maegashira #12; 0–2–13	West Jūryō #10; 6–9	West Jūryō #13; 11–4; Champion
1989	East Jūryō #3; 10–5	East Maegashira #14; 10–5; F	West Maegashira #4; 8–7	East Maegashira #2; 6–9 ★	West Maegashira #4; 4–11	West Maegashira #11; Sat out due to injury 0–0–15
1990	West Jūryō #7; 12–3; Champion	East Jūryō #2; 10–5–P; Champion	West Maegashira #12; 2–13	West Jūryō #8; Retired; 1–12	x	x
Record given as wins–losses–absences Top division champion Top division runner-up Retired Lower divisions Non-participation Sanshō key: F=Fighting spirit; O=Outstanding performance; T=Technique Also shown: ★=Kinboshi; P=Playoff(s); Divisions: Makuuchi — Jūryō — Makushita — Sandanme — Jonidan — Jonokuchi Makuuchi ranks: Yokozuna — Ōzeki — Sekiwake — Komusubi — Maegashira

== See also ==
- Glossary of sumo terms
- List of sumo tournament second division champions
- List of past sumo wrestlers
- List of sumo elders
- List of sekiwake
