= Wakakōyū Masaya =

Japanese sumo wrestler

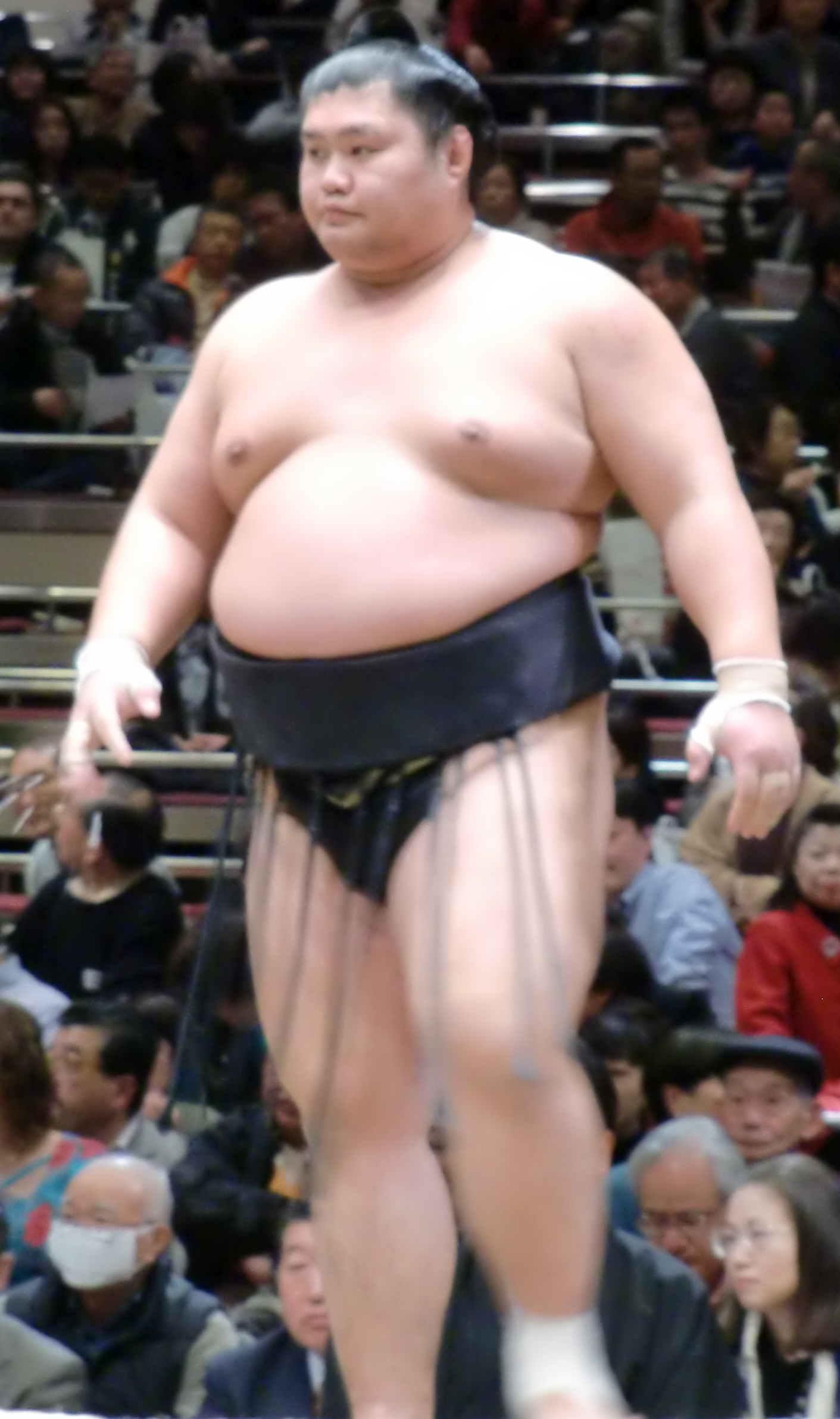

Personal information
- Native name: 若荒雄 匡也
- Born: Masaya Yakigaya; 24 February 1984 (age 42) Funabashi, Chiba, Japan
- Height: 1.79 m (5 ft 10 1/2 in)
- Weight: 166 kg (366 lb; 26.1 st)

Sport
- Sport: Sumo
- Retired: September, 2014
- Heya: Ōnomatsu
- Record: 466–444–31
- Debut: March, 1999
- Highest rank: Komusubi (Jan, 2012)
- Elder name: Shiranui
- Championships: 1 (Sandanme)
- Special Prizes: Fighting Spirit (1)
- Updated on Feb 1, 2015

Wakakōyū Masaya (born 24 February 1984 as Masaya Yakigaya) is a former professional sumo wrestler from Funabashi, Japan. His highest rank was komusubi. The last two characters of his ring name were taken from his mentor and coach at Ōnomatsu, the former Masurao. He was only the second wrestler from his stable to reach the top division. He was runner-up in one tournament and earned one special prize, for Fighting Spirit. He is now a sumo coach.

== Early life and sumo background ==
Two years after his birth in Funabashi, his father was killed in a car accident and he was subsequently raised alone by his mother. Ōnomatsu stable being very near the home of one of his relatives, he began visiting it from a young age. This eventually led to him entering the stable in 1999.

== Career ==
Fighting under his own surname of Yakigaya, he rose steadily through the ranks until reaching sandanme where he started to struggle. He managed to reach makushita in September 2002 but was demoted back to sandanme after one tournament. In 2003, he missed two tournaments, but upon returning earned two impressive records topped off with a perfect 7–0 record to win the sandanme championship in the last tournament of that year. He fought for four years in the makushita ranks with occasional temporary demotions to sandanme before finally achieving a record that enabled his promotion to the second division, jūryō, in January 2008. To mark his arrival in the elite sekitori ranks he changed his shikona to Wakakōyū.

After a year and half in jūryō with two demotions to makushita he managed a 9–6 record at the jūryō 2 rank and was promoted to the bottom of the makuuchi division in July 2009. He only managed a 4–11 record and fell back to jūryō. After a one off 6–9 record this tournament, he took in a string of winning records over the next several tournaments to again reach the top division makuuchi in May 2010. This time he proved himself with a 10–5 record that would have allowed him to fight in the next tournament at a career high maegashira 8. However, at this time, he admitted to having been involved in baseball gambling along with a number of other higher ranked wrestlers and was forced to sit out the tournament and was demoted back to jūryō having never fought at his (then) highest achieved rank.

He bounced back from this setback with two winning tournaments, the second being an impressive 10–5 at jūryō's highest rank. This awarded him another chance to prove himself in makuuchi in the January 2011 tournament. Wakakōyū and Toyohibiki were the last two wrestlers to again reach the top division after being demoted from it in the gambling scandal. After an 8–7 score at maegashira 10 in the May Technical Examination Tournament, he reached the upper maegashira ranks for the first time at #3. He managed to defeat two ōzeki (Kotooshu and Kaiō) but finished with a losing score of 5–10. His best performance in the top division came in November 2011 when he finished runner-up to yokozuna Hakuhō with a score of 12–3 and was awarded his first sanshō or special prize, for Fighting Spirit. It also saw him promoted to the sanyaku ranks for the first time at komusubi for the following tournament in January 2012. However, a decline in his performances saw him demoted back to the jūryō division at the end of 2012 having scored only 4–11 at maegashira 13 in November. After a few years as a fixture in the second division he retired mid-tournament in September 2014 when his losing record had assured his demotion to the unsalaried ranks.

== Retirement from sumo ==
Wakakōyū has stayed in the sumo world as a coach at Ōnomatu stable. He has secured one of the Sumo Association's 105 toshiyori-kabu or elder names, and is now known as Shiranui Oyakata. His danpatsu-shiki or official retirement ceremony was held at the Ryogoku Kokugikan on January 31, 2015.

== Fighting style ==
Wakakōyū was an oshi-sumo specialist, preferring pushing and thrusting techniques to fighting on the mawashi. His most common winning kimarite were oshi-dashi (push out), tsuki dashi (thrust out) and hiki-otoshi (pull down).

== Career record ==
Wakakōyū Masaya
Year	January Hatsu basho, Tokyo	March Haru basho, Osaka	May Natsu basho, Tokyo	July Nagoya basho, Nagoya	September Aki basho, Tokyo	November Kyūshū basho, Fukuoka
1999	x	(Maezumo)	East Jonokuchi #18; 4–3	East Jonidan #151; 3–4	West Jonokuchi #5; 6–1	West Jonidan #71; 2–5
2000	East Jonidan #99; 4–3	West Jonidan #69; 5–2	West Jonidan #25; 4–3	West Jonidan #5; 4–3	West Sandanme #88; 4–3	East Sandanme #70; 3–4
2001	West Sandanme #90; 3–4	West Jonidan #4; 4–3	East Sandanme #86; 5–2	West Sandanme #55; 4–3	East Sandanme #39; 4–3	West Sandanme #25; 3–4
2002	West Sandanme #43; 4–3	West Sandanme #27; 2–5	East Sandanme #55; 6–1	East Sandanme #3; 4–3	West Makushita #55; 3–4	East Sandanme #7; 1–6
2003	West Sandanme #43; 6–1	East Makushita #55; Sat out due to injury 0–0–7	West Sandanme #35; Sat out due to injury 0–0–7	East Sandanme #96; 6–1	East Sandanme #38; 5–2	East Sandanme #11; 7–0–P; Champion
2004	West Makushita #9; 3–4	West Makushita #17; 1–6	West Makushita #46; 2–5	East Sandanme #9; 4–3	West Makushita #59; 5–2	West Makushita #43; 2–5
2005	East Sandanme #4; 4–3	West Makushita #55; 4–3	East Makushita #46; 5–2	East Makushita #28; 2–5	East Makushita #44; 3–4	West Makushita #52; 1–6
2006	West Sandanme #23; 6–1	East Makushita #43; 6–1	West Makushita #18; 5–2	West Makushita #9; 5–2	East Makushita #5; 5–2	West Makushita #1; 2–5
2007	East Makushita #11; 3–4	West Makushita #18; 3–4	East Makushita #29; 5–2	West Makushita #19; 4–3	East Makushita #15; 6–1	West Makushita #3; 4–3
2008	East Jūryō #14; 7–8	East Makushita #2; 5–2	East Jūryō #13; 8–7	West Jūryō #10; 5–10	East Makushita #1; 5–3	West Jūryō #7; 6–9
2009	West Jūryō #9; 7–8	East Jūryō #11; 11–4	West Jūryō #2; 9–6	East Maegashira #16; 4–11	West Jūryō #6; 6–9	West Jūryō #9; 9–6
2010	East Jūryō #4; 8–7	West Jūryō #1; 9–6	East Maegashira #15; 10–5	East Maegashira #8; Suspended; 0–0–15	East Jūryō #6; 8–7	East Jūryō #1; 10–5
2011	East Maegashira #14; 9–6	Tournament Cancelled; 0–0–0	West Maegashira #10; 8–7	East Maegashira #3; 5–10	West Maegashira #6; 6–9	West Maegashira #9; 12–3; F
2012	West Komusubi #1; 5–10	East Maegashira #5; 7–8	East Maegashira #6; 10–5	East Maegashira #3; 3–12	West Maegashira #10; 6–9	West Maegashira #13; 4–11
2013	East Jūryō #3; 6–9	East Jūryō #7; 6–9	East Jūryō #9; 6–9	West Jūryō #12; 8–7	East Jūryō #11; 7–8	East Jūryō #11; 8–7
2014	West Jūryō #8; 6–9	East Jūryō #11; 7–8	West Jūryō #11; 5–10	East Makushita #3; 4–3	West Jūryō #14; Retired; 5–8	x
Record given as wins–losses–absences Top division champion Top division runner-up Retired Lower divisions Non-participation Sanshō key: F=Fighting spirit; O=Outstanding performance; T=Technique Also shown: ★=Kinboshi; P=Playoff(s); Divisions: Makuuchi — Jūryō — Makushita — Sandanme — Jonidan — Jonokuchi Makuuchi ranks: Yokozuna — Ōzeki — Sekiwake — Komusubi — Maegashira

== See also ==
- List of sumo tournament top division runners-up
- Glossary of sumo terms
- List of past sumo wrestlers
- List of sumo elders
- List of komusubi
