= Asasegawa Takeya =

Japanese sumo wrestler (1942–2017)

Personal information
- Native name: 淺瀬川 剛也
- Born: Kenji Kameyama; 4 May 1942 Kawachinagano, Osaka, Japan
- Died: 22 September 2017 (aged 75)
- Height: 1.77 m (5 ft 9 1/2 in)
- Weight: 139 kg (306 lb)

Sport
- Sport: Sumo
- Retired: May, 1971
- Heya: Araiso → Isegahama
- Record: 493-471-19
- Debut: May, 1957
- Highest rank: Maegashira 1 (January, 1965)
- Elder name: Urakaze
- Championships: 2 (Jūryō); 2 (Makushita)
- Special Prizes: Technique (1)
- Gold Stars: 4 Kashiwado (2); Sadanoyama; Taihō
- Updated on June 2020

Asasegawa Takeya (born 4 May 1942 as Kenji Kameyama, died 22 September 2017) was a sumo wrestler from Naniwa-ku, Osaka, Japan. He made his professional debut in May 1957 and reached the top division in March 1964. His highest rank was maegashira 1. Upon retirement from active competition he became an elder in the Japan Sumo Association under the name Urakaze. He left the Association in January 1975.

== Career record ==
- The Nagoya tournament was first held in 1958.

Asasegawa Takeya
Year	January Hatsu basho, Tokyo	March Haru basho, Osaka	May Natsu basho, Tokyo	July Nagoya basho, Nagoya	September Aki basho, Tokyo	November Kyūshū basho, Fukuoka
1957	x	x	(Maezumo)	Not held	West Jonokuchi #11; 5–3	East Jonidan #87; 5–3
1958	East Jonidan #62; 5–3	West Jonidan #43; 5–3	East Jonidan #17; 4–4	West Jonidan #14; 2–6	West Jonidan #26; 5–3	East Jonidan #1; 4–4
1959	West Sandanme #104; 4–4	West Sandanme #93; Sat out due to injury 0–0–7	West Jonidan #14; 5–3	West Sandanme #100; 6–2	East Sandanme #78; 6–2	West Sandanme #45; 6–2
1960	West Sandanme #17; 3–5	West Sandanme #19; 6–2	East Makushita #81; 3–5	West Sandanme #1; 2–5	East Sandanme #16; 2–5	East Sandanme #32; 5–2
1961	East Sandanme #14; 4–3	East Sandanme #5; 6–1	East Makushita #56; 3–4	West Makushita #63; 2–5	West Makushita #74; 3–4	West Makushita #79; 2–5
1962	West Sandanme #8; 6–1	East Makushita #36; 5–2	East Makushita #47; 7–0; Champion	East Makushita #4; 6–1	West Makushita #1; 4–3	West Jūryō #18; 8–7
1963	East Jūryō #12; 8–7	East Jūryō #7; 4–11	West Jūryō #15; 11–4	West Jūryō #8; 12–3	East Jūryō #2; 5–10	West Jūryō #6; 9–6
1964	East Jūryō #1; 10–5	West Maegashira #14; 6–9	West Jūryō #3; 12–3; Champion	West Maegashira #13; 10–5	East Maegashira #6; 9–6	East Maegashira #2; 8–7 ★
1965	East Maegashira #1; 4–11	East Maegashira #6; 9–6	East Maegashira #2; 6–9	East Maegashira #4; 8–7	West Maegashira #3; 4–11	East Maegashira #9; 9–6
1966	West Maegashira #4; 9–6 ★	East Maegashira #2; 8–7; T★	East Maegashira #1; 0–4–11	West Maegashira #11; 10–5	East Maegashira #4; 3–12	West Maegashira #9; 7–8
1967	East Maegashira #11; 11–4	East Maegashira #3; 6–9 ★	West Maegashira #6; 1–14	West Jūryō #1; 6–9	East Jūryō #4; Sat out due to injury 0–0–15	East Makushita #1; 1–6
1968	West Makushita #19; 7–0; Champion	West Jūryō #11; 10–5	East Jūryō #4; 12–3	East Maegashira #10; 6–9	East Jūryō #1; 10–5	East Maegashira #11; 2–13
1969	East Jūryō #7; 9–6	East Jūryō #3; 12–3; Champion	East Maegashira #10; 8–7	East Maegashira #8; 9–6	West Maegashira #2; 3–12	East Maegashira #9; 8–7
1970	West Maegashira #4; 6–9	West Maegashira #6; 9–6	East Maegashira #3; 2–13	East Maegashira #12; 7–8	West Jūryō #1; 5–10	West Jūryō #6; 5–10
1971	West Jūryō #12; 9–6	East Jūryō #8; 7–8	East Jūryō #9; Retired; 2–13			
Record given as wins–losses–absences Top division champion Top division runner-up Retired Lower divisions Non-participation Sanshō key: F=Fighting spirit; O=Outstanding performance; T=Technique Also shown: ★=Kinboshi; P=Playoff(s); Divisions: Makuuchi — Jūryō — Makushita — Sandanme — Jonidan — Jonokuchi Makuuchi ranks: Yokozuna — Ōzeki — Sekiwake — Komusubi — Maegashira

== See also ==
- Glossary of sumo terms
- List of past sumo wrestlers
- List of sumo tournament second division champions
