= Katayama Shinji =

Japanese sumo wrestler

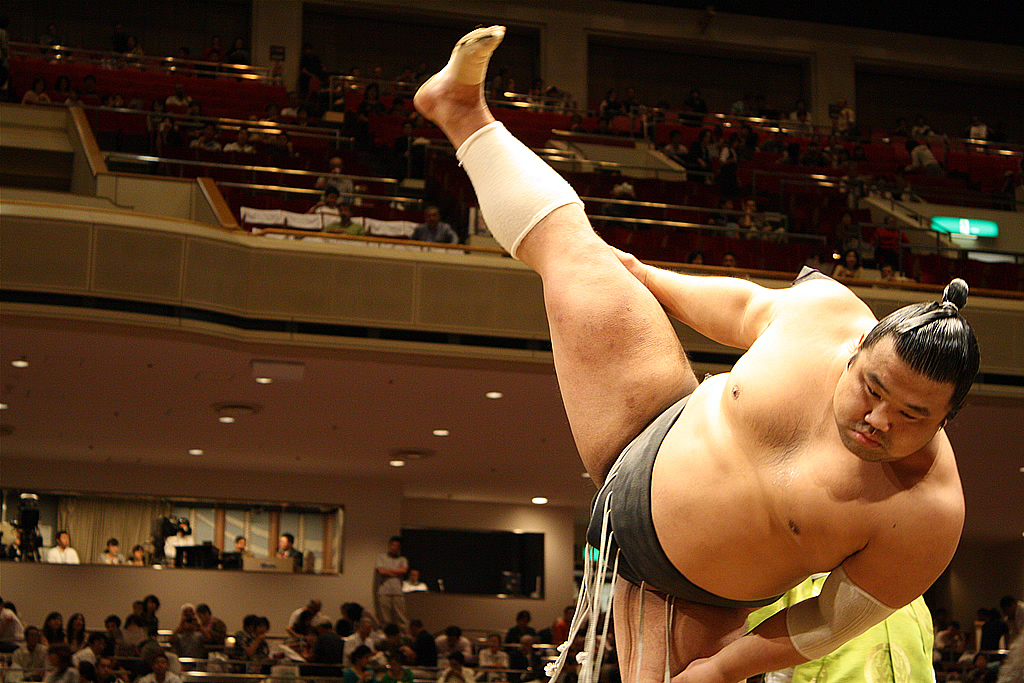
- Katayama performing his high shiko stamps in September 2008

Personal information
- Native name: 片山 伸次
- Born: Shinji Katayama; September 6, 1979 (age 47) Yaizu, Japan
- Height: 1.80 m (5 ft 11 in)
- Weight: 140 kg (310 lb)

Sport
- Sport: Sumo
- University team: Senshu University
- Retired: January, 2009
- Heya: Onomatsu
- Record: 241-239-0
- Debut: March, 2002
- Highest rank: Maegashira 13 (July, 2005)
- Championships: 1 (Jonokuchi)
- Updated on January 2009

Katayama Shinji (born September 6, 1979) is a former sumo wrestler from Yaizu, Shizuoka, Japan. His highest rank was maegashira 13.

== Career ==
Katayama practised amateur sumo at Senshu University, finishing third at the All Japan Sumo Championships. He made his professional debut in March 2002 at the age of 22, joining Onomatsu stable. He did not have enough amateur titles to enter at the makushita level, instead beginning his career at the lowest level of sumo entry, maezumo. Nevertheless, he moved through the divisions quickly, reaching sekitori status upon promotion to the second highest jūryō division in July 2004.

Katayama was promoted to the top makuuchi division in May 2005. He earned eight wins against seven losses in that tournament, but did not manage to achieve kachi-koshi in the top division again. He could manage only a 7-8 score at the rank of jūryō 13 in March 2008, leaving him dangerously close to demotion to the unsalaried ranks. He maintained his sekitori status with a 9-6 mark in May 2008, but a disastrous 2-13 in July meant he was demoted to makushita for the September tournament. He retired in January 2009.

Unlike most sumo wrestlers, Katayama never adopted a traditional shikona, instead using his own surname as his fighting name. Other recent sekitori to use their own names include Shimotori, Satoyama, Kakizoe and Ichihara.

He was admired for the quality of his stamps during the pre-bout rituals, known as shiko, as he was able to raise his leg straight up in the air.

== Fighting style ==
He was an oshi-sumo specialist who referred pushing and thrusting techniques. His most common winning kimarite was a straightforward oshidashi, or push out.

== Career record ==
Katayama Shinji
Year	January Hatsu basho, Tokyo	March Haru basho, Osaka	May Natsu basho, Tokyo	July Nagoya basho, Nagoya	September Aki basho, Tokyo	November Kyūshū basho, Fukuoka
2002	x	(Maezumo)	East Jonokuchi #30; 7–0; Champion	West Jonidan #26; 6–1	West Sandanme #63; 5–2	West Sandanme #33; 4–3
2003	East Sandanme #19; 5–2	East Makushita #58; 6–1	East Makushita #29; 0–7	West Sandanme #4; 4–3	East Makushita #54; 6–1	East Makushita #24; 4–3
2004	West Makushita #15; 4–3	West Makushita #12; 5–2	West Makushita #6; 6–1	West Jūryō #12; 8–7	West Jūryō #7; 6–9	East Jūryō #11; 7–8
2005	East Jūryō #12; 10–5	East Jūryō #5; 10–5	West Maegashira #16; 8–7	West Maegashira #13; 4–11	East Jūryō #2; 8–7	East Maegashira #16; 7–8
2006	West Maegashira #16; 6–9	East Jūryō #2; 9–6	East Maegashira #14; 5–10	West Jūryō #1; 6–9	West Jūryō #3; 8–7	West Maegashira #15; 6–9
2007	East Jūryō #2; 6–9	West Jūryō #6; 7–8	West Jūryō #7; 5–10	West Jūryō #12; 7–8	East Jūryō #13; 8–7	West Jūryō #11; 9–6
2008	East Jūryō #9; 5–10	East Jūryō #13; 7–8	West Jūryō #14; 9–6	East Jūryō #9; 2–13	West Makushita #5; 4–3	East Makushita #2; 2–5
2009	East Makushita #16; Retired; 0–0–6	x	x	x	x	x
Record given as wins–losses–absences Top division champion Top division runner-up Retired Lower divisions Non-participation Sanshō key: F=Fighting spirit; O=Outstanding performance; T=Technique Also shown: ★=Kinboshi; P=Playoff(s); Divisions: Makuuchi — Jūryō — Makushita — Sandanme — Jonidan — Jonokuchi Makuuchi ranks: Yokozuna — Ōzeki — Sekiwake — Komusubi — Maegashira

== See also ==
- Glossary of sumo terms
- List of past sumo wrestlers
