= Ōnomatsu stable =

Organization of sumo wrestlers

Coordinates: 35.6705°N 140.0348°E

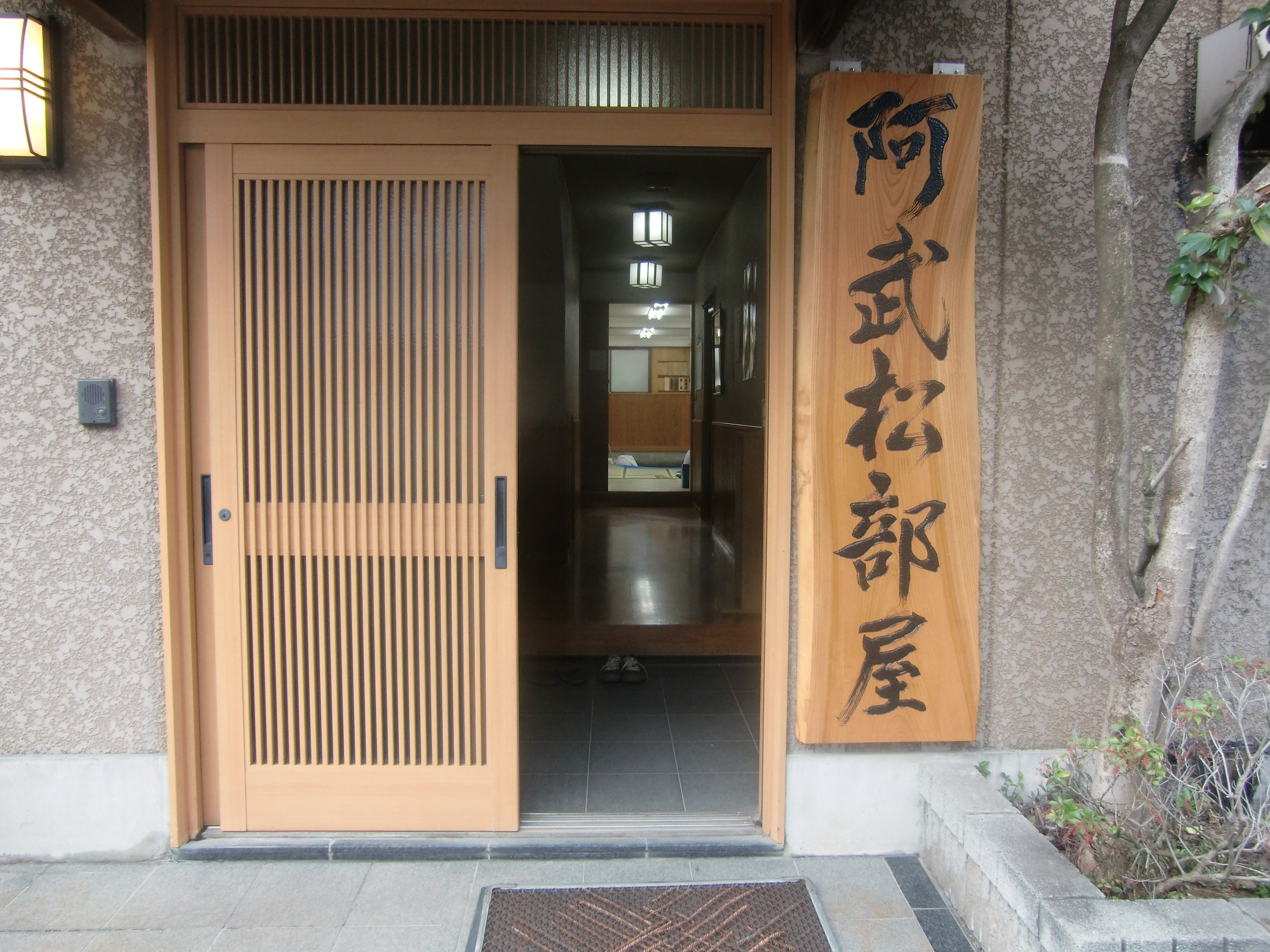

Ōnomatsu stable (阿武松部屋, Ōnomatsu-beya) is a stable of sumo wrestlers, one of the Nishonoseki ichimon or group of stables. It was founded in its modern form on 1 October 1994 by Masurao Hiroo, who branched off from the now defunct Oshiogawa stable.

As of May 2026, the stable has 13 active wrestlers.

== History ==
The stable first wrestler to reach the top makuuchi division was Katayama in 2005. The now retired Wakakōyū reached komusubi in 2012, as did Ōnoshō in 2017. The stable's most successful foreign recruit has been the Russian former maegashira Amūru, who retired in 2018.
In January 2010 the stable, along with the Takanohana, Ōtake and Magaki stable, was forced to leave the Nishonoseki ichimon after former yokozuna Takanohana declared his intention to run as an unofficial candidate in the elections to the Sumo Association's board of directors. The ejected stables formed their own group, which gained ichimon status of its own in 2014. This was dissolved in 2018, with the Ōnomatsu, Ōtake and Chiganoura stables briefly forming Ōnomatsu ichimon before aligning themselves once again with the Nishonoseki group. Masurao resigned from the Japan Sumo Association for health reasons on 26 September 2019 and was replaced by the former maegashira Daidō.

On 26 December, the Japan Sumo Association announced the stable recruited Batjargal Choijirsuren, a Mongolian-born Student Yokozuna, and allowed him to use the makushita tsukedashi system and enter his first official tournament at the rank of makushita 15. Now wrestling under the shikona of Ōnokatsu, he made his competitive debut at the November 2023 tournament.

== Owner ==
- 2019–present 13th Ōnomatsu, (iin, maegashira Daidō, born 1982)
- 1994–2019: 12th Ōnomatsu, sekiwake Masurao, born 1961)

== Coach ==
- Shiranui Masaya (iin, komusubi Wakakōyū, born 1984)

== Notable active wrestlers ==
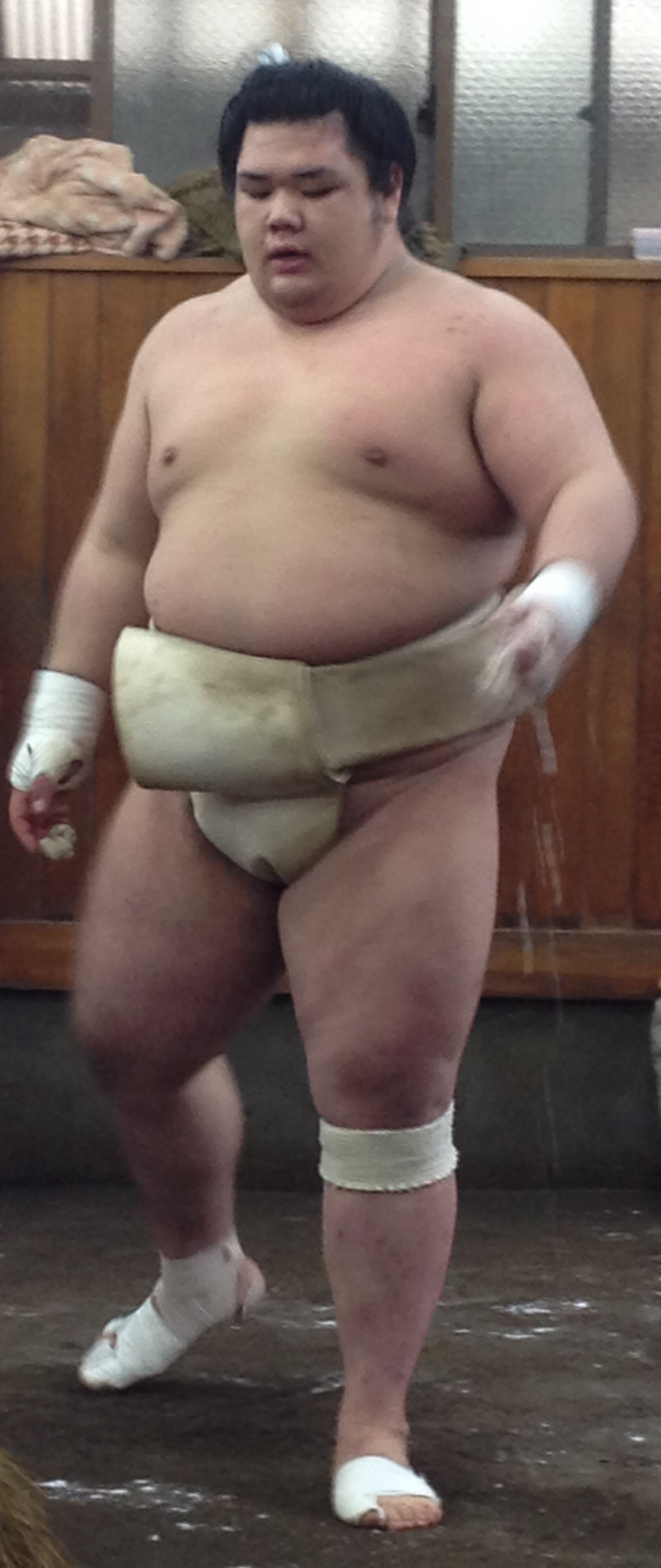
Ōnoshō was the most senior wrestler in Ōnomatsu stable from 2018 until his 2024 retirement.

- Ōnokatsu (best rank maegashira, born 2000)

== Notable former members ==
- Ōnoshō (best rank komusubi, born 1996)
- Wakakōyū (best rank komusubi, born 1984)
- Amūru (best rank maegashira 5, born 1983)
- Daidō (best rank maegashira 8, born 1982)
- Katayama (best rank maegashira 13, born 1979)
- Keitenkai (best rank jūryō 11, born 1990)
- Yūma (best rank jūryō 13, born 1998)

== Usher ==
- Jin (jonokuchi yobidashi, real name Jin Sekimoto, born 2006)

== Hairdresser ==
- Tokotaka (first class tokoyama, born 1964)
- Tokoyū (third class tokoyama, born 1996)

== Location and access ==
Chiba prefecture, Narashino city, Saginuma 5-5-14
10 minutes from Makuharihongō Station on Sōbu Main Line and Keisei Chiba Line

== See also ==
- List of sumo stables
- List of active sumo wrestlers
- List of past sumo wrestlers
- Glossary of sumo terms
