= Hōchiyama Kōkan =

Japanese sumo wrestler

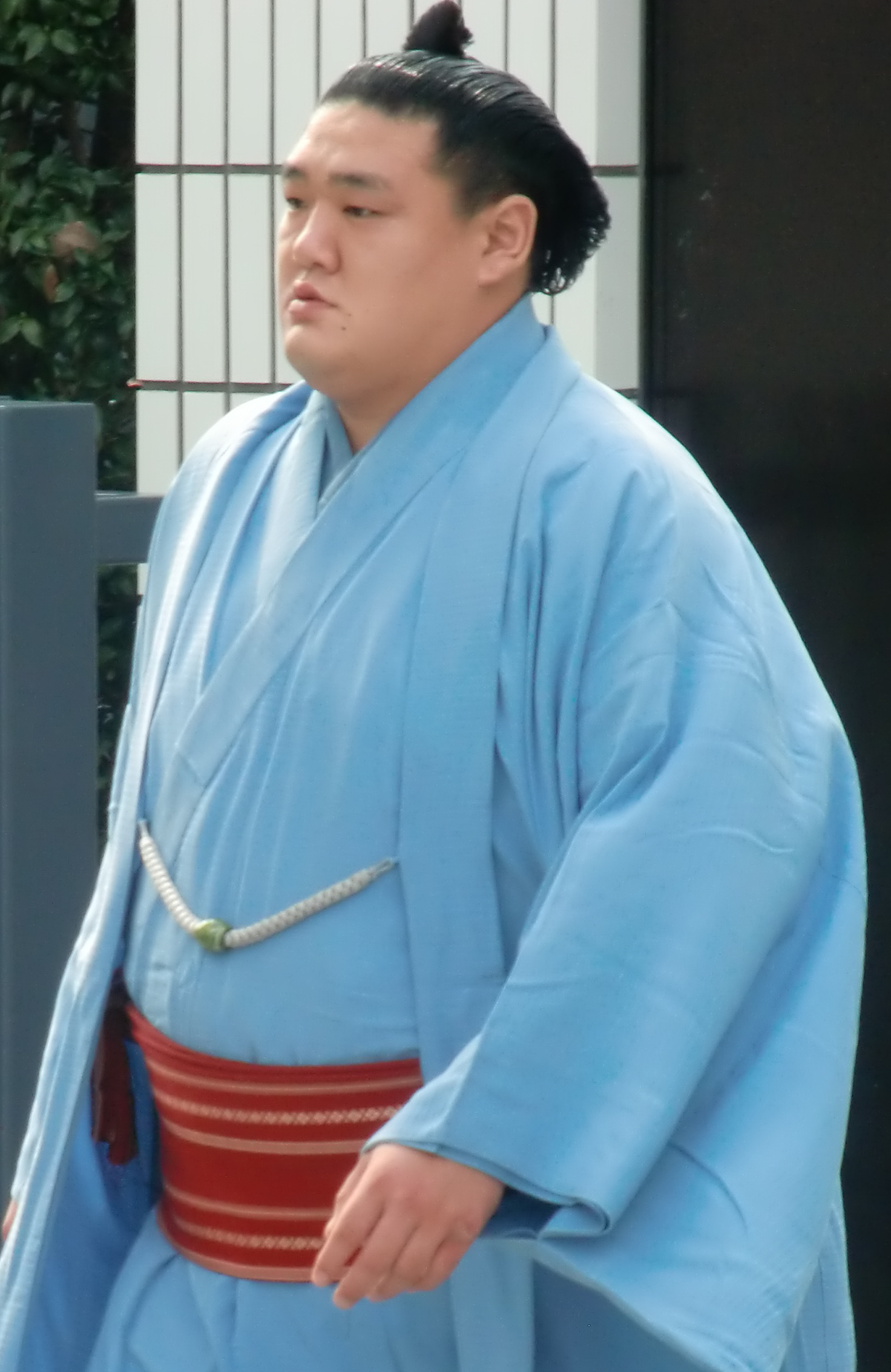

Personal information
- Native name: 寶智山 幸観
- Born: Yukimi Munakata; January 18, 1982 (age 44) Aomori
- Height: 1.89 m (6 ft 2 1/2 in)
- Weight: 143 kg (315 lb; 22.5 st)

Sport
- Sport: Sumo
- Retired: January 2014
- Heya: Sakaigawa, formerly Nakadachi
- Record: 399-400
- Debut: March, 2000
- Highest rank: Maegashira 14 (September 2006)
- Elder name: Tatsutagawa
- Championships: 1 (Jūryō); 1 (Sandanme); 1 (Jonokuchi)
- Updated on Dec 2020

Hōchiyama Kōkan (born January 18, 1982, as Yukimi Munakata) is a former sumo wrestler from Hirosaki, Aomori Prefecture, Japan. He joined professional sumo in 2000. His highest rank was maegashira 14, achieved in 2006. After illness saw him demoted to the third makushita division in 2008, he returned to the second highest jūryō division in 2010 and the top makuuchi division in September 2011. After winning the sandanme division he had just been demoted to in November 2013, he chose to retire. He is now a coach at Sakaigawa stable under the name of Tatsutagawa (立田川).

== Career ==
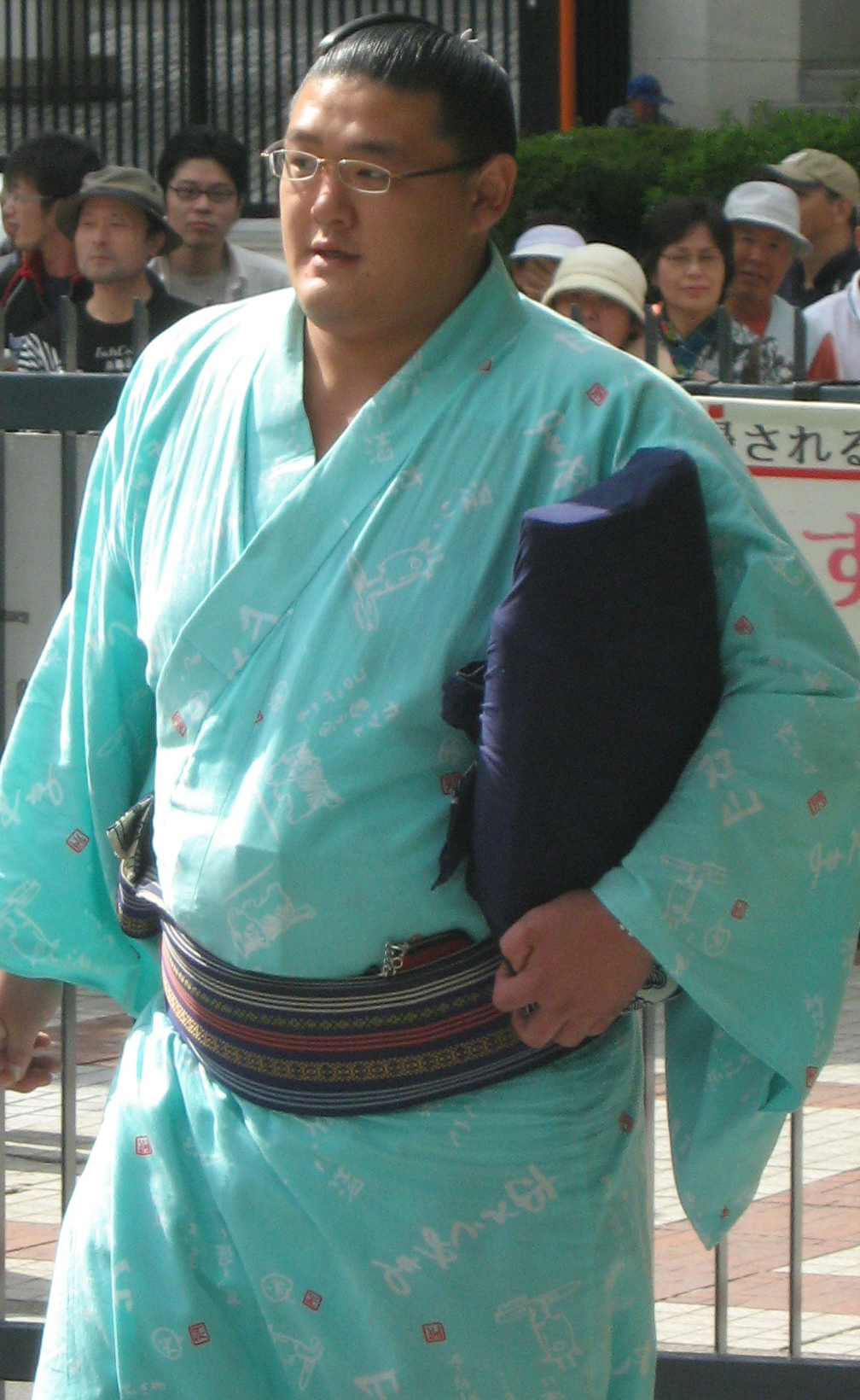

He was born in the city of Hirosaki (as was Wakanosato). Hōchiyama was a member of Kizukuri High School sumo club (also attended by Mainoumi) and he made his professional debut in March 2000. He joined the Nakadachi stable set up by former komusubi Ryōgoku, which was subsequently renamed Sakaigawa stable.

Hōchiyama took the jonokuchi championship with a perfect 7-0 record in his first tournament as a rikishi and he earned promotion to sandanme in November 2000 with another 7-0 score. However he found his opponents in the third makushita division much more difficult to deal with and his progress slowed. He narrowly missed out on promotion to the second highest jūryō division a number of times, recording 3-4 marks at makushita 1 in July 2004 and November 2005. After 24 tournaments in the third division he finally achieved promotion in January 2006 when a 4–3 score at makushita 4 was enough to reach jūryō. He became the second member of his stable to reach sekitori status, following Iwakiyama, and the first to do it progressing through all the professional sumo divisions, Iwakiyama having made his debut in makushita.

In jūryō, while starting off with a mere 8–7 in January, he would follow up with a 10–5 runner-up in March, but winning only once and losing twice in a hard-fought three-way playoff. Then in July 2006 by winning the jūryō championship with a 13–2 record, Hōchiyama reached the top makuuchi division in only in three tournaments. He could only manage five wins in his top division debut in September 2006 and was demoted back to jūryō. He reappeared in makuuchi in May 2007 but after two more make-koshi or losing scores he fell back to the second division once again in September of that year. He just missed out on immediate promotion back to the top division after recording seven wins against eight losses at the rank of jūryō 1. However, restricted by diabetes, a disastrous performance of 2-13 at the rank of jūryō 6 in the March 2008 tournament (which was his sixth consecutive losing score) saw him demoted to the third division for May.

After more than two years in makushita, he finally returned to the sekitori ranks in July 2010 after scoring 5-2 at the rank of makushita 1 in May. He came through with a winning record of 8–7, securing his kachi-koshi on the final day after four straight losses. He was one of seven rikishi from Sakaigawa stable ranked in jūryō in September 2010, the others being Iwakiyama, Gōeidō, Toyohibiki, Sadanoumi, Sadanofuji and Shironoryū. After a solid 9-6 at jūryō 5 in July 2011, he was promoted back to the top division for September after a 23 tournament absence - the fourth longest ever. He scored only 5-10 on his return and was immediately demoted back to jūryō, but he ensured with an 8-7 score at jūryō 1 in January 2012 that he was promoted to makuuchi once again for the March 2012 tournament. However he failed in his fifth attempt at a top division kachi-koshi, finishing on 4–11. In his sixth and final appearance in makuuchi he fared even worse, only scoring 1–14. He is the only wrestler in the modern era of sumo to have six top division tournaments without a kachi-koshi.

== Retirement from sumo ==
In November 2013, after dropping to the sandanme division for the first time since the beginning of his career, Hōchiyama managed to take the championship. He still chose to retire before the beginning of the following January 2014 tournament. He had been suffering from chronic lower back pain and diabetes. He has remained in sumo as a coach, initially under the toshiyori or elder name of Kimgahama Oyakata. He had 29 tournaments at a sekitori rank; normally 30 are required to become an oyakata but Hochiyama was allowed because his stablemaster and previous owner of the stock acted as guarantors, under new Sumo Association rules brought in on November 17, 2013. In December 2020 he switched from the Kimgahama name (owned by Okinoumi) to Furiwake (owned by the former Takamisakari). In December 2023 he became Dekiyama after exchanging elder stock with former maegashira Sadanofuji, and in May 2024 he changed his elder name again to Tatsutagawa.

== Fighting style ==
Hōchiyama's favourite techniques were listed by the Sumo Association as migi-yotsu (a left hand outside, right hand inside grip on his opponent's mawashi), yori (grappling) and tsuki (thrusting). The majority of his wins were by either yori-kiri (force out) or oshi-dashi (push out).

== Career record ==
Hōchiyama Kōkan
Year	January Hatsu basho, Tokyo	March Haru basho, Osaka	May Natsu basho, Tokyo	July Nagoya basho, Nagoya	September Aki basho, Tokyo	November Kyūshū basho, Fukuoka
2000	x	(Maezumo)	East Jonokuchi #14; 7–0; Champion	West Jonidan #25; 4–3	East Jonidan #7; 3–4	East Jonidan #27; 7–0–P
2001	West Sandanme #30; 2–5	West Sandanme #51; 3–4	East Sandanme #65; 5–2	West Sandanme #31; 3–4	West Sandanme #47; 5–2	West Sandanme #22; 3–4
2002	East Sandanme #37; 6–1	West Makushita #52; 4–3	East Makushita #46; 4–3	West Makushita #37; 3–4	West Makushita #50; 5–2	West Makushita #28; 3–4
2003	East Makushita #37; 6–1–P	West Makushita #15; 4–3	West Makushita #11; 2–5	West Makushita #27; 6–1	East Makushita #10; 1–6	East Makushita #33; 3–4
2004	East Makushita #37; 4–3	East Makushita #28; 5–2	East Makushita #17; 5–2	East Makushita #7; 6–1	East Makushita #1; 3–4	West Makushita #4; 2–5
2005	East Makushita #16; 3–4	West Makushita #23; 4–3	West Makushita #19; 5–2	East Makushita #9; 6–1	East Makushita #3; 4–3	East Makushita #1; 3–4
2006	West Makushita #4; 4–3	East Jūryō #14; 8–7	West Jūryō #11; 10–5–PPP	East Jūryō #6; 13–2; Champion	West Maegashira #14; 5–10	West Jūryō #3; 7–8
2007	East Jūryō #4; 8–7	West Jūryō #1; 8–7	West Maegashira #14; 6–9	West Maegashira #16; 6–9	East Jūryō #1; 7–8	East Jūryō #2; 6–9
2008	East Jūryō #5; 7–8	West Jūryō #6; 2–13	West Makushita #4; 2–5	West Makushita #14; 4–3	West Makushita #10; 4–3	East Makushita #5; 3–4
2009	West Makushita #10; 3–4	West Makushita #14; 4–3	West Makushita #8; 3–4	East Makushita #12; 4–3	West Makushita #8; 5–2	East Makushita #4; 3–4
2010	West Makushita #5; 4–3	East Makushita #3; 4–3	West Makushita #1; 5–2	West Jūryō #11; 8–7	East Jūryō #3; 6–9	West Jūryō #6; 6–9
2011	East Jūryō #10; 7–8	Tournament Cancelled; 0–0–0	West Jūryō #10; 7–8	East Jūryō #5; 9–6	East Maegashira #17; 5–10	West Jūryō #5; 9–6
2012	West Jūryō #1; 8–7	West Maegashira #15; 4–11	East Jūryō #3; 9–6	East Maegashira #15; 1–14	East Jūryō #9; 8–7	West Jūryō #6; 5–10
2013	West Jūryō #11; 6–9	East Jūryō #14; 5–10	West Makushita #3; 2–5	West Makushita #14; 1–6	East Makushita #43; 2–5	West Sandanme #7; 7–0; Champion
2014	West Makushita #14; Retired –	x	x	x	x	x
Record given as wins–losses–absences Top division champion Top division runner-up Retired Lower divisions Non-participation Sanshō key: F=Fighting spirit; O=Outstanding performance; T=Technique Also shown: ★=Kinboshi; P=Playoff(s); Divisions: Makuuchi — Jūryō — Makushita — Sandanme — Jonidan — Jonokuchi Makuuchi ranks: Yokozuna — Ōzeki — Sekiwake — Komusubi — Maegashira

== See also ==
- Glossary of sumo terms
- List of sumo tournament second division champions
- List of past sumo wrestlers
- List of sumo elders
