= Tochiōzan Yūichirō =

Japanese sumo wrestler

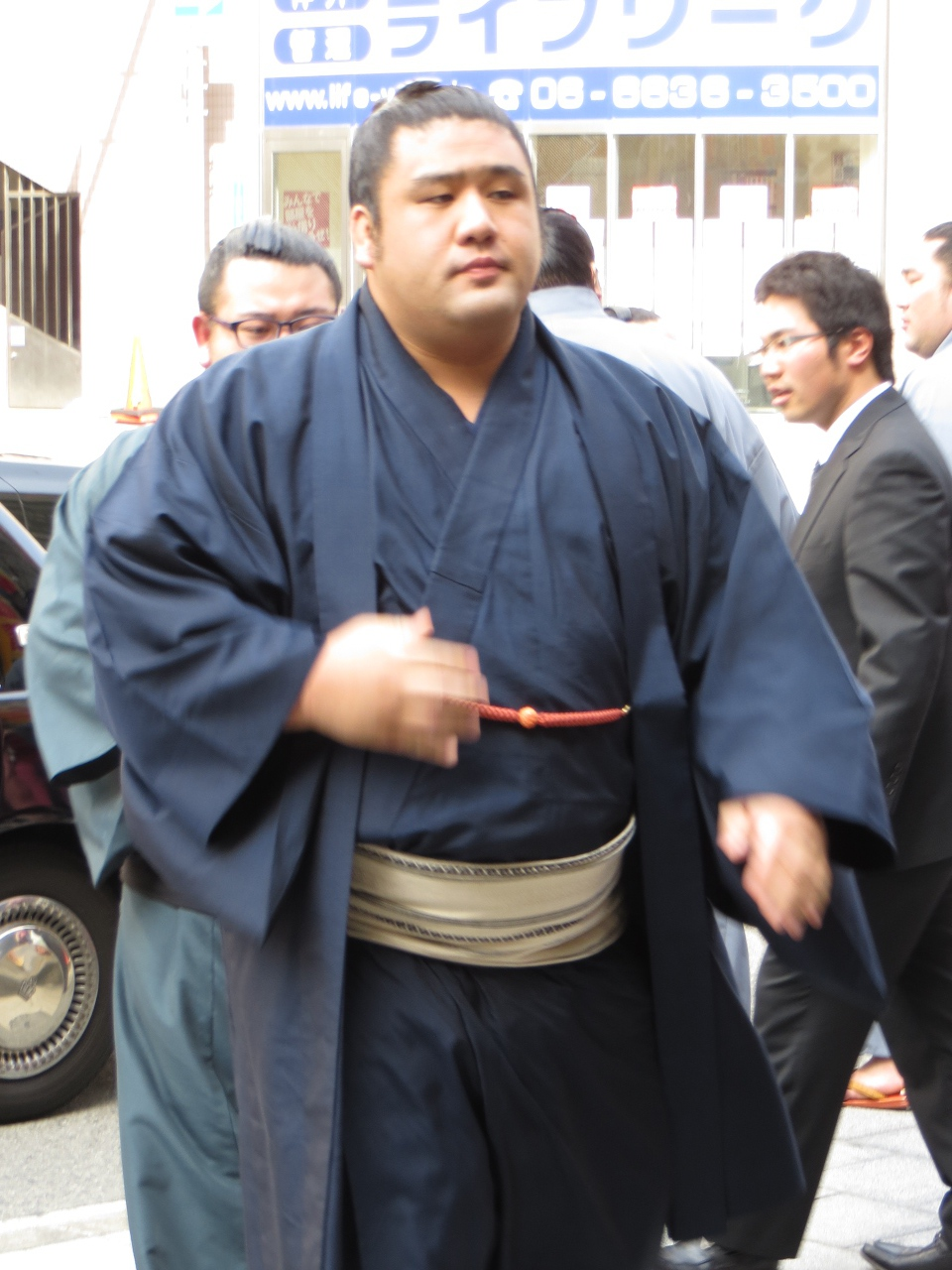
- Tochiōzan in 2013

Personal information
- Native name: 栃煌山 雄一郎
- Born: Yūichirō Kageyama; March 9, 1987 (age 39) Aki, Kōchi, Japan
- Height: 1.87 m (6 ft 1 1/2 in)
- Weight: 152 kg (335 lb; 23 st 13 lb)

Sport
- Sport: Sumo
- Retired: July 2020
- Heya: Kasugano
- Record: 661-598-19
- Debut: January 2005
- Highest rank: Sekiwake (September 2010)
- Elder name: Kiyomigata
- Championships: 1 (Sandanme)
- Special Prizes: Outstanding Performance (2); Fighting Spirit (2); Technique (2)
- Gold Stars: 6 Hakuhō, Harumafuji, Kakuryū, Kisenosato (3)
- Updated on July 15, 2020

Tochiōzan Yūichirō (Japanese: 栃煌山 雄一郎; born March 9, 1987 as Yūichirō Kageyama (影山 雄一郎)) is a Japanese former professional sumo wrestler from Aki, Kōchi. He made his professional debut in January 2005 and reached the top makuuchi division in March 2007, retiring in July 2020. At one point he was regarded as one of the most promising Japanese rikishi during a period of domination by foreign born wrestlers. His highest rank was sekiwake. His best performance came in May 2012 when he tied with Kyokutenhō after fifteen days but was beaten in a play-off. He earned six special prizes for his achievements in tournaments and six gold stars for defeating yokozuna. He made twenty-five appearances in the san'yaku ranks.

== Early life and sumo background ==
Kageyama was exposed to sumo from a very young age because it was popular in his area and his parents were fans of the sport. His parents arranged for him to join a local sumo club. He did not enjoy sumo at all at first, disliking the fierceness and the constant training that was necessary. He considered quitting many times, but as he continued he eventually came to enjoy and excel at the sport and transferred to Meitoku Gijuku junior high school, a school in his native Kōchi prefecture known for its strong sumo program. In his third year of junior high he won a national competition and was named the junior high yokozuna. Upon graduation, he transferred to far away Saitama Sakae High School, in the greater Tokyo area to continue his sumo training, as this school was also known for its strong sumo program. The future ōzeki Gōeidō was already a member there, and the two would begin a spirited rivalry that continues to this day in their professional roles. As high school graduation approached he considered university, but eventually chose to enter professional sumo directly from high school.

== Career ==
Several different heya were interested in recruiting him for professional sumo, but he eventually chose Kasugano stable. He made his ring debut at the March 2005 tournament, under his family name Kageyama. He rose through the divisions quickly, winning the third lowest sandanme division championship in November of that same year. In September 2006 at the age of 19 he became a salaried sekitori wrestler when he entered jūryō, the second highest division, adopting the ring name Tochiōzan.

He made his debut in the top makuuchi division in March 2007, where he was in contention for the championship until the 14th day. He finished with a strong 11–4 record and won the Fighting Spirit award. Promoted to maegashira 4 for the May tournament, he faced all the top ranked wrestlers for the first time and faltered with a 6–9 record, suffering the first tournament in his career where he had more losses than wins (make-koshi). At the July tournament the same year he suffered a dislocated shoulder on the tenth day and was forced to withdraw. Ranked at maegashira 13 in September, he finished the tournament with a disappointing 7–8 score, losing his last five bouts. He remained at the bottom of the division for the next few tournaments, struggling with lower back pain, but returned to form in March 2008, finishing with 11–4 and winning the Technique award. He struggled once again in May however, losing his first eight bouts before staging a partial recovery to finish on 5–10. He was one of seven wrestlers who NHK commentator Shuhei Nagao (the former Mainoumi) in 2008 called the "Seven Samurai" and identified as "holding the key" to a Japanese resurgence in sumo, which was dominated by foreigners in the top ranks. (The others were Gōeidō, Kisenosato, Kotoshōgiku, Homashō, Toyonoshima and Toyohibiki).

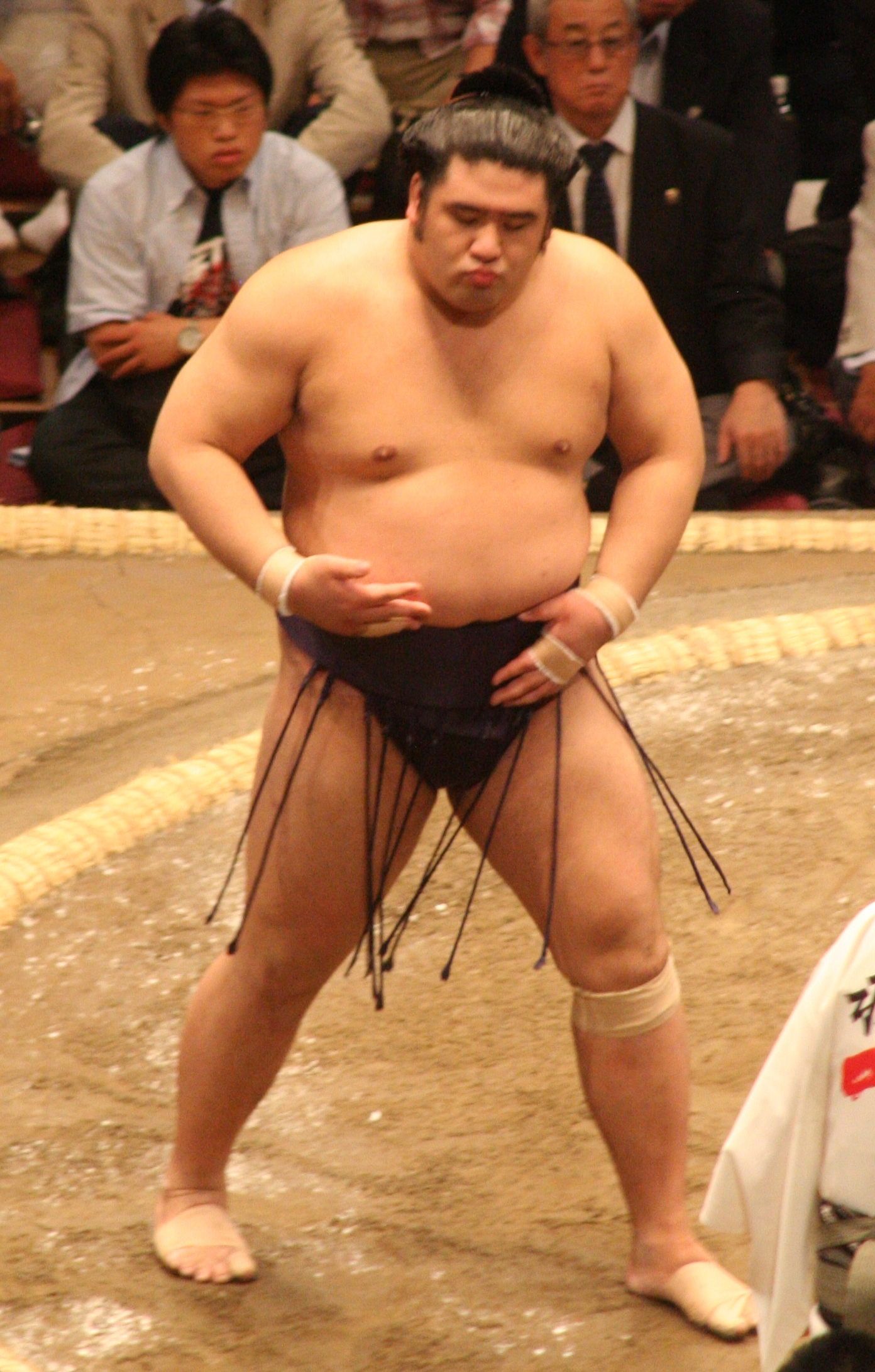
Tochiōzan before his first bout in san'yaku in May 2009.

After disappointing 6–9 scores in September and November 2008, he fell to maegashira 12, where he responded by winning his first eight matches in January 2009, finishing on 10–5. This resulted in promotion to maegashira 2 for the March 2009 tournament. He had a good start to this tournament as well, defeating three ōzeki (Kotoōshū, Harumafuji and Chiyotaikai) and standing at 7–3 after ten days. He then lost four matches in a row, before securing his kachi-koshi with a win on the final day.

This was enough to earn Tochiōzan promotion to the san'yaku ranks for the first time for the May 2009 tournament, at the rank of komusubi. When the banzuke for the tournament was released in late April he held a press conference and said he would like to go one win better than his rival from high school sumo days, Gōeidō, who had just made sekiwake for the first time. They began their professional careers in the same tournament and Tochiōzan preceded him into the jūryō and makuuchi divisions, but he had beaten Gōeidō just once in six meetings, in September 2007. In the end both wrestlers finished on 6–9, although Tochiōzan did beat his rival for the second time in their individual match. Falling back to the maegashira ranks for July, he could only produce a very poor 2–13 record, with one of his wins coming against Gōeidō. An 11–4 score in September 2009 put him back up to maegashira 3 for the November tournament in Kyushu, where he beat two ōzeki (Harumafuji and the struggling Chiyotaikai) but fell short with a 5–10 record.

At maegashira 6 in March 2010 he defeated ōzeki Kotomitsuki and scored 11–4, returning to komusubi. A strong 9–6 record in July, which included defeats of two more ōzeki, earned him promotion to sekiwake for the first time for the September 2010 tournament. His sekiwake debut was a success as he scored 11–4 and was awarded his second Technique prize. However, two losing scores in his next two tournaments saw him fall out of san'yaku, and a disappointing 4–11 in May 2011 saw him lose further ground. He withdrew from the November tournament on the 11th day after suffering a ligament injury to his right ankle. However he returned with a strong performance in the opening tournament of 2012, posting an 11–4 record. He would have received his first Fighting Spirit prize since his top division debut had he defeated Gagamaru on the final day, but he failed to do so.

In May 2012, he lost the final playoff for the Emperor's Cup, being defeated by fellow maegashira Kyokutenhō after both finished with 12–3 records. This was the first ever playoff match between two maegashira ranked wrestlers, and his defeat meant he just missed out on becoming the first Japanese born makuuchi division yūshō winner since Tochiazuma in January 2006. He received a share of the Fighting Spirit Award for his efforts. He returned to the sekiwake rank for the next tournament. In September he defeated Hakuhō for the first time in 15 attempts to earn his first gold star or kinboshi, and won the Outstanding Performance Award.

Tochiōzan was ranked mainly in san'yaku from the beginning of 2013 until March 2016, although he was unable to mount a serious challenge for ōzeki promotion. After dropping temporarily to a maegashira position because of injury he picked up his second gold star in November 2014 with a win over Harumafuji. In July 2015 he defeated both yokozuna competing in that tournament, Hakuhō and Kakuryū, and won the second Outstanding Performance Prize of his career. He maintained his sekiwake rank until March 2016, then fell from san'yaku after scoring only 4–11 at komusubi in May. He earned the third kinboshi of his career by defeating Kakuryū on the third day of the July 2016 tournament. In September 2016 rose back the ranks to komusubi but just barely failed to get a winning record, with a 7–8, and was demoted from the rank. This has been his last appearance in sanyaku to date. In May 2017 he earned his fourth kinboshi with a defeat of Kisenosato on Day 9. In Nagoya in July, wrestling at maegashira 5, Tochiōzan produced one of his best performances for several years. After compiling a respectable 5–3 record in the first week he won his last seven matches including victories over the ōzeki Takayasu and the sekiwake Tamawashi and Mitakeumi to earn a return to komusubi for the next tournament. This was his 14th tournament at komusubi rank, putting him equal third for most komusubi appearances since the beginning of the Shōwa period. He returned to the maegashira ranks after a 6–9 record in this tournament. He withdrew from the January 2018 tournament on Day 12 with a left shoulder injury. In November 2018 he won his first five matches, including wins over Kisenosato and Takayasu, finishing with an 8–7 record. He defeated Kisenosato again in January 2019, his sixth kinboshi, in what proved to be Kisenosato's final match before retirement.

== Retirement from sumo ==
In November 2019 Tochiozan fell to the jūryō division for the first time since 2007. He made an immediate return to the top division after a 10–5 record, but was demoted to jūryō again after a 3–12 record at maegashira 10 in March 2020, which proved to be his final performance. Tochiozan announced his retirement in July 2020, shortly before the re-arranged Nagoya tournament in Tokyo was due to begin. He is staying in sumo as an elder and is now known as Kiyomigata Oyakata. He had previously loaned the elder name to former maegashira Bushuyama. His danpatsu-shiki or official retirement ceremony was held on 30 January 2022, on the same weekend as his rival Gōeidō.

== Fighting style ==
Tochiozan's most common winning techniques or kimarite were yori-kiri, oshi-dashi, yori-taoshi and oshi-taoshi, meaning he won most often by simply forcing his opponents out and down with a grip on the mawashi or push to the chest. He rarely used throwing moves or slap downs. His preferred mawashi grip was migi-yotsu, with his left arm outside and right arm inside his opponent's arms.

== Family ==
Tochiōzan's marriage was registered in June 2017, although a wedding reception was not immediately scheduled. The couple were said to be expecting their first child in September 2017. The wedding reception was eventually held on 11 February 2019 and was attended by roughly 500 guests, among them was singer Fumiya Fujii who sang his hit True Love.

== Career record ==
Tochiōzan Yūichirō
Year	January Hatsu basho, Tokyo	March Haru basho, Osaka	May Natsu basho, Tokyo	July Nagoya basho, Nagoya	September Aki basho, Tokyo	November Kyūshū basho, Fukuoka
2005	(Maezumo)	East Jonokuchi #31; 6–1	East Jonidan #61; 6–1	East Sandanme #93; 6–1	East Sandanme #36; 5–2	West Sandanme #12; 7–0–P; Champion
2006	West Makushita #12; 4–3	West Makushita #7; 5–2	West Makushita #3; 5–2	East Makushita #1; 6–1	East Jūryō #11; 9–6	West Jūryō #7; 9–6
2007	West Jūryō #2; 10–5–PP	East Maegashira #14; 11–4; F	West Maegashira #4; 6–9	East Maegashira #7; 4–6–5	West Maegashira #13; 7–8	East Maegashira #15; 7–8
2008	East Maegashira #15; 8–7	East Maegashira #12; 11–4; T	East Maegashira #5; 5–10	East Maegashira #11; 9–6	West Maegashira #6; 6–9	East Maegashira #9; 6–9
2009	East Maegashira #12; 10–5	West Maegashira #2; 8–7	West Komusubi #1; 6–9	East Maegashira #2; 2–13	East Maegashira #12; 11–4	East Maegashira #3; 5–10
2010	East Maegashira #10; 8–7	East Maegashira #6; 11–4	West Komusubi #1; 7–8	East Maegashira #1; 9–6	West Sekiwake #1; 11–4; T	East Sekiwake #1; 7–8
2011	East Komusubi #1; 6–9	West Maegashira #2; Tournament Cancelled; Match fixing investigation 0–0–0	West Maegashira #2; 4–11	East Maegashira #8; 10–5	West Maegashira #3; 7–8	West Maegashira #4; 5–6–4
2012	West Maegashira #8; 11–4	West Komusubi #1; 5–10	East Maegashira #4; 12–3–P; F	West Sekiwake #1; 4–11	East Maegashira #5; 9–6; O★	West Maegashira #1; 10–5
2013	East Komusubi #1; 8–7	East Komusubi #1; 10–5	East Komusubi #1; 6–9	East Maegashira #2; 10–5	East Komusubi #1; 8–7	West Sekiwake #1; 7–8
2014	West Komusubi #1; 11–4	West Sekiwake #2; 9–6	West Sekiwake #1; 10–5	West Sekiwake #1; 2–6–7	East Maegashira #8; 11–4	East Maegashira #1; 8–7 ★
2015	West Komusubi #1; 7–8	East Maegashira #1; 10–5	East Komusubi #1; 8–7	East Sekiwake #1; 10–5; O	East Sekiwake #1; 8–7	East Sekiwake #1; 8–7
2016	East Sekiwake #1; 7–8	East Komusubi #1; 4–11	East Maegashira #5; 8–7	West Maegashira #1; 8–7 ★	West Komusubi #1; 7–8	East Maegashira #1; 6–9
2017	East Maegashira #4; 3–12	West Maegashira #10; 10–5	East Maegashira #4; 6–9 ★	West Maegashira #5; 12–3	West Komusubi #1; 6–9	West Maegashira #2; 4–11
2018	East Maegashira #8; 6–6–3	East Maegashira #11; 5–10	East Maegashira #15; 8–7	East Maegashira #13; 10–5	West Maegashira #7; 8–7	East Maegashira #2; 8–7 ★
2019	East Maegashira #1; 6–9 ★	East Maegashira #4; 3–12	West Maegashira #11; 6–9	East Maegashira #12; 5–10	West Maegashira #16; 6–9	East Jūryō #2; 10–5
2020	East Maegashira #16; 9–6	West Maegashira #10; 3–12	West Jūryō #2; Tournament Cancelled; State of Emergency; 0–0–0	West Jūryō #2; Retired –	x	x
Record given as wins–losses–absences Top division champion Top division runner-up Retired Lower divisions Non-participation Sanshō key: F=Fighting spirit; O=Outstanding performance; T=Technique Also shown: ★=Kinboshi; P=Playoff(s); Divisions: Makuuchi — Jūryō — Makushita — Sandanme — Jonidan — Jonokuchi Makuuchi ranks: Yokozuna — Ōzeki — Sekiwake — Komusubi — Maegashira

== See also ==
- List of sumo elders
- List of sumo tournament top division runners-up
- List of active gold star earners
- Glossary of sumo terms
- List of past sumo wrestlers
- List of sekiwake
