= Takekuma stable =

Organization of sumo wrestlers

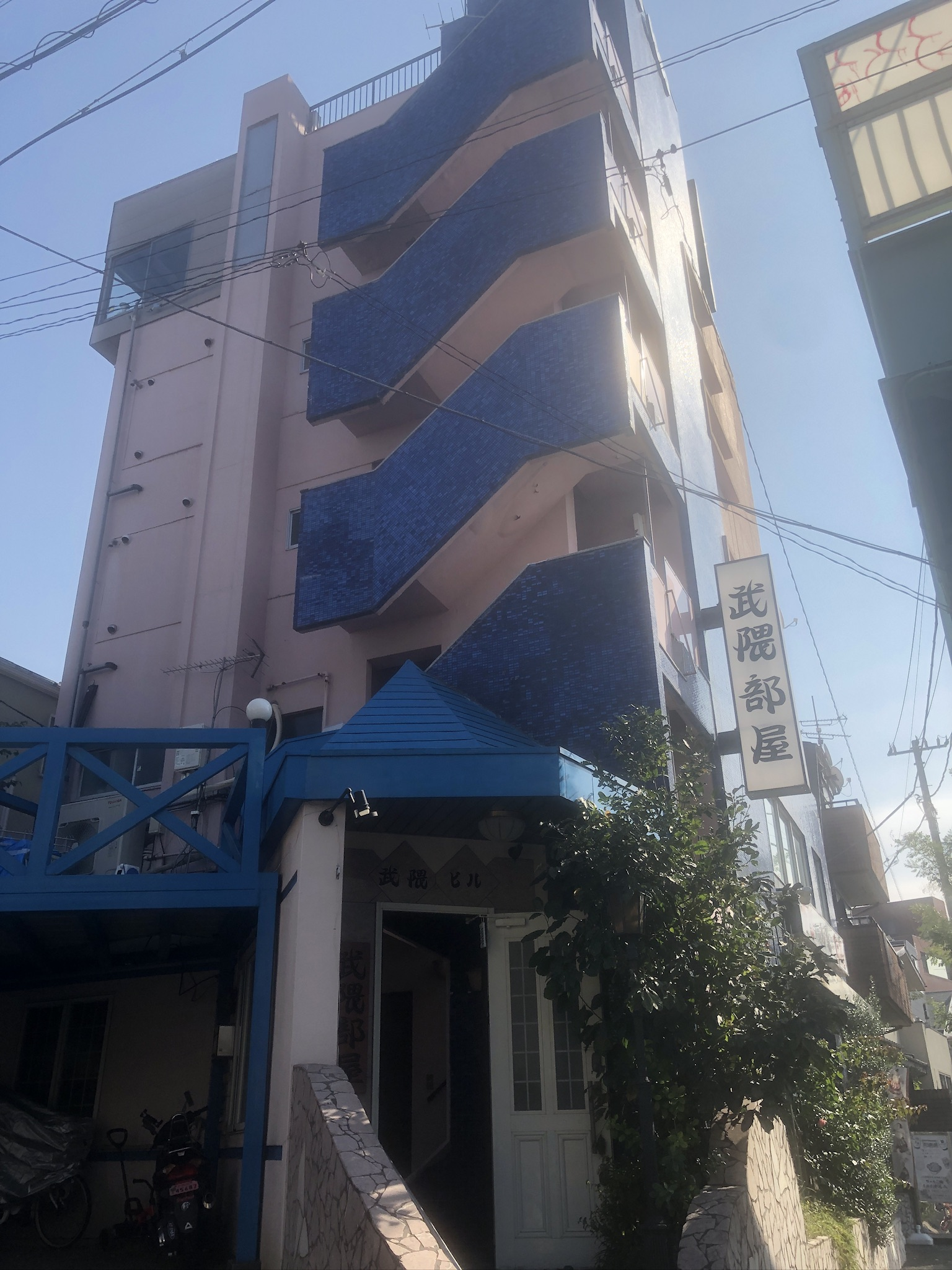
Stable building

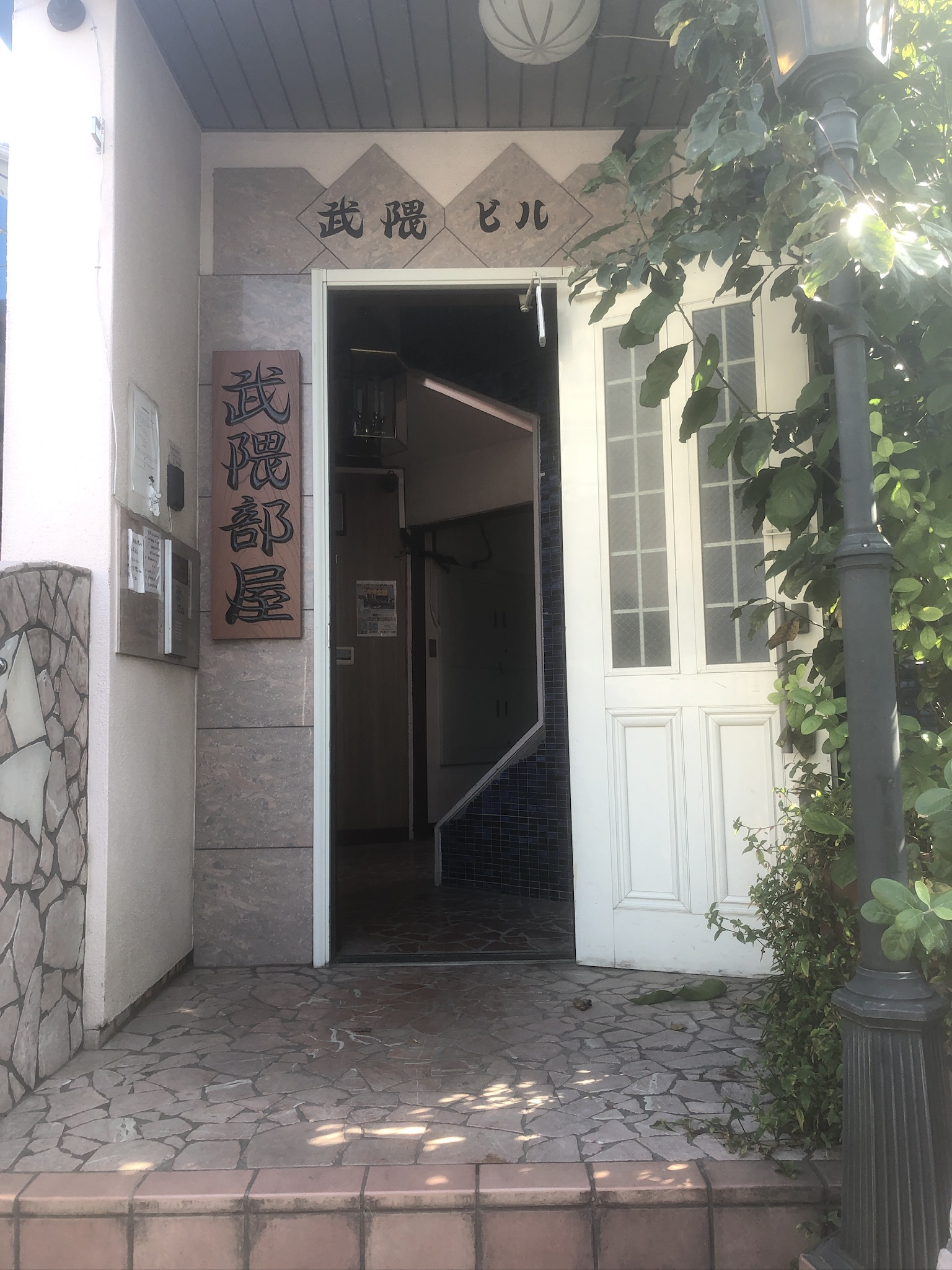
Entrance to stable

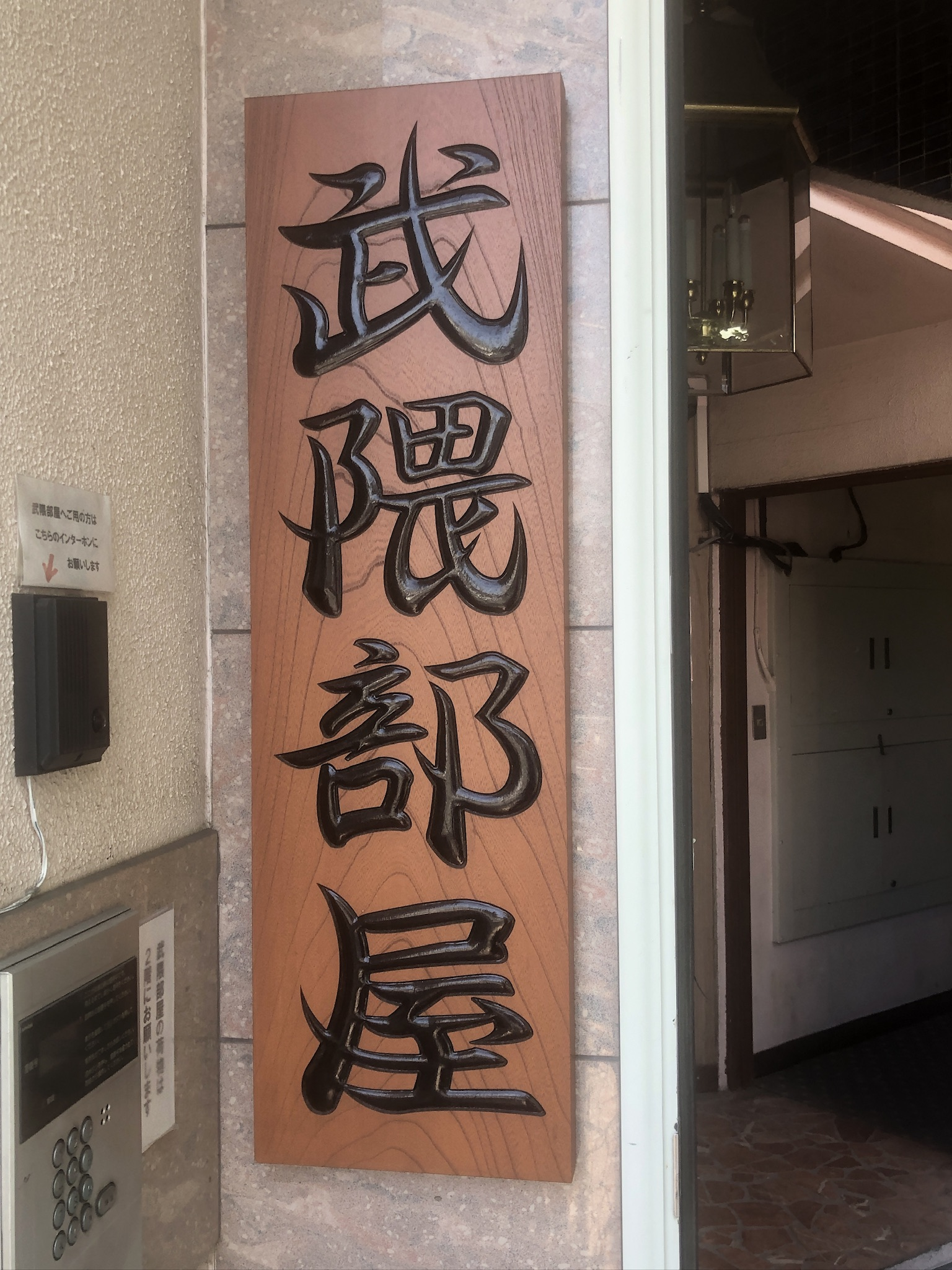
Stable sign

Takekuma stable (武隈部屋, Takekuma-beya) is a stable of sumo wrestlers, one of the Dewanoumi group of stables. It broke off from Sakaigawa stable by its founder, ōzeki Gōeidō Gōtarō, and officially opened in February 2022. In May 2022 Nishikawa (now Gōnoyama) became the first member of the stable to be promoted to the jūryō division.

As of May 2026, the stable has 12 active wrestlers.

== Ring name conventions ==
Some wrestlers at this stable take ring names or shikona that begin with the character 豪 (read: gō), in deference to the coach and stable's owner, Gōeidō.

== Owners ==
- 2021–present: 14th Takekuma (iin, ōzeki Gōeidō, born 1986)

== Notable active wrestlers ==
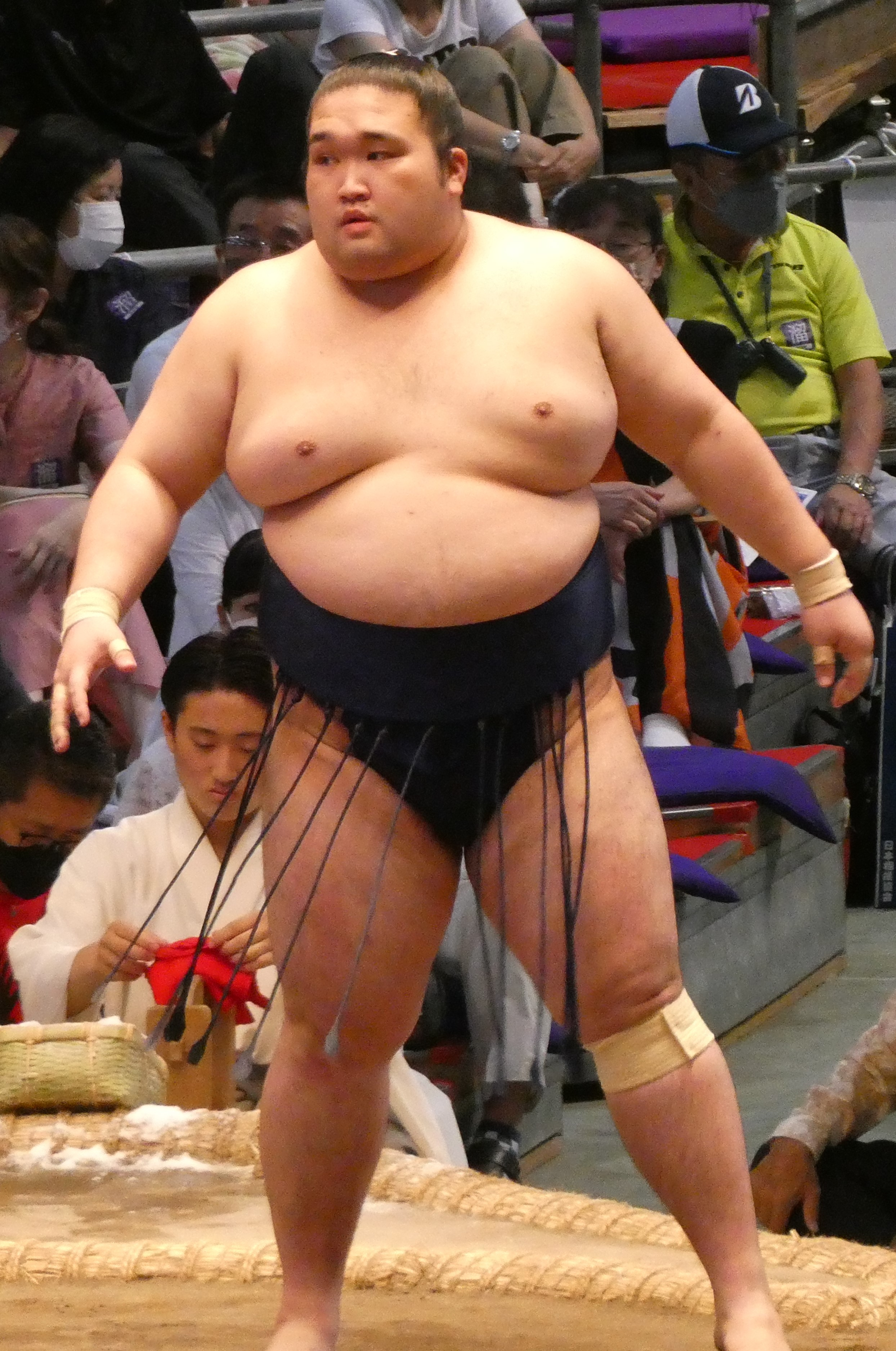
Gōnoyama is the stable's first sekitori

- Gōnoyama (best rank maegashira, born 1998)

== Usher ==
- Kumajiro (jonokuchi yobidashi, real name Raiku Matsumoto, born 2004)

== Location and access ==
The stable is planned to be built in Yukigayaōtsuka-chō, Ōta, Tokyo.

== See also ==
- List of sumo stables
- List of active sumo wrestlers
- List of past sumo wrestlers
- Glossary of sumo terms
