= Toyohibiki Ryūta =

Japanese sumo wrestler

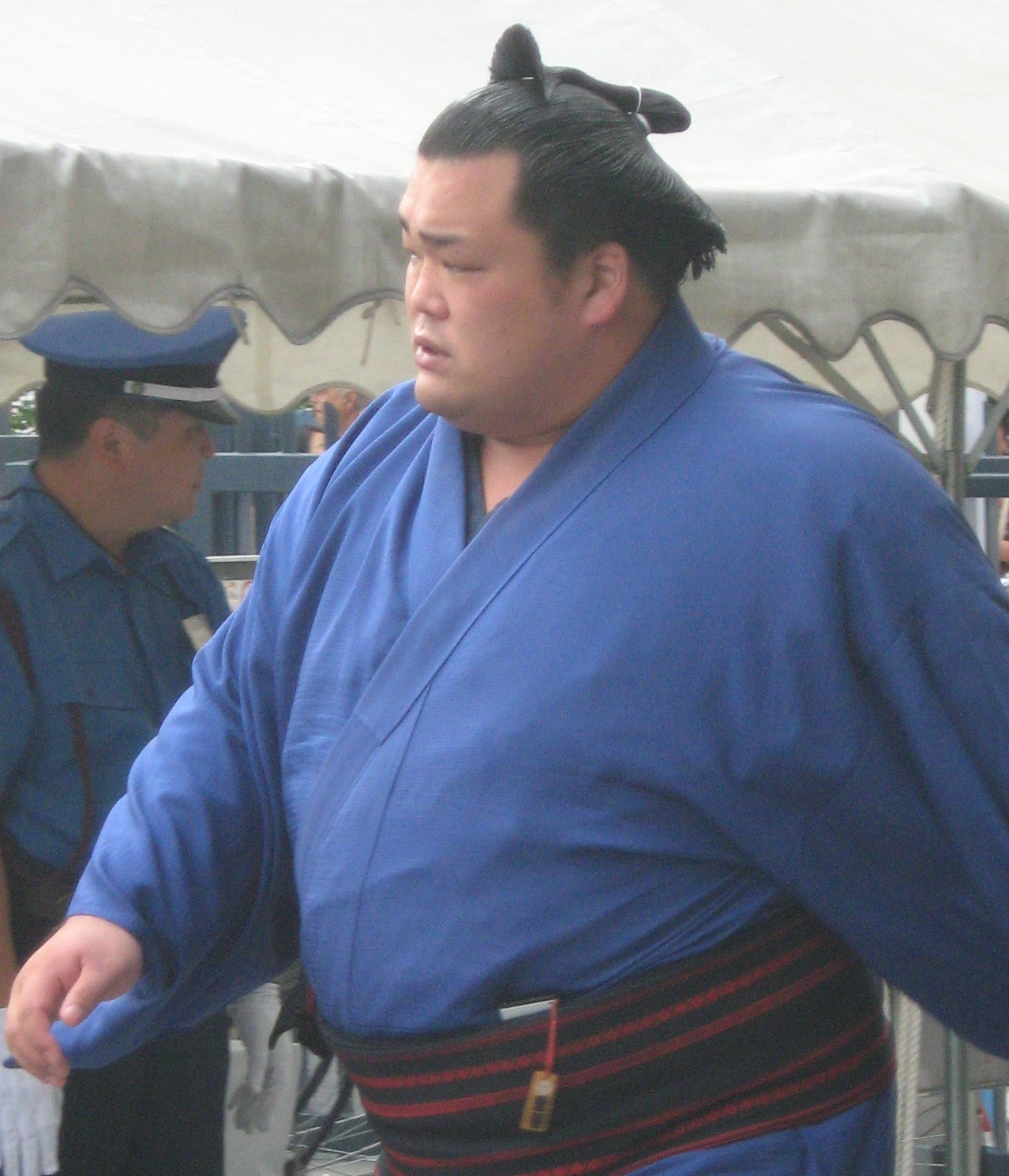
- Toyohibiki in 2008

Personal information
- Native name: 豊響 隆太
- Born: Ryūta Kadomoto; November 16, 1984 (age 41) Toyoura, Yamaguchi, Japan
- Height: 1.85 m (6 ft 1 in)
- Weight: 189 kg (417 lb; 29.8 st)

Sport
- Sport: Sumo
- Retired: June, 2021
- Heya: Sakaigawa
- Record: 569-565-66
- Debut: January, 2005
- Highest rank: Maegashira 2 (November, 2008)
- Elder name: Yamashina
- Championships: 3 (Jūryō); 1 (Jonidan)
- Special Prizes: Fighting Spirit (3)
- Gold Stars: 1 (Hakuhō)
- Updated on July 13, 2021

Toyohibiki Ryūta (Japanese: 豊響 隆太; born November 16, 1984 as Ryūta Kadomoto (門元 隆太)) is a former Japanese professional sumo wrestler from Toyoura, Yamaguchi. He turned professional in 2005, reaching the top makuuchi division in July 2007. He has earned two special prizes for Fighting Spirit, and one gold star for a yokozuna upset. His highest rank was maegashira 2. He was from Sakaigawa stable, which had four other wrestlers with top division experience for much of the time he was in makuuchi: Myōgiryū, Sadanofuji, Sadanoumi and Gōeidō, the last of whom joined at the same time as him. He had one of the most tournaments ranked in makuuchi without reaching ever san'yaku. His ring name roughly translates as "abundant echo". He retired in June 2021 to become a coach and elder of the Japan Sumo Association under the name of Yamashina Oyakata.

== Early life and sumo background ==
Kadomoto became interested in sumo in his second year of primary school when he joined an area boys' sports club; also in the club was the future sumo star Hōmashō, three years his senior. Though he showed promise in sumo, preferring to stay local, he did not transfer to one of the more well-known high schools with a strong sumo program. While he was in the sumo club, the owner of Sakaigawa stable visited him with an eye to recruiting him, but did not like his attitude and dismissed him as a candidate. After high school he tried out various jobs such a shipyard work and truck driving. Eventually, however, a dialogue was opened again with Sakaigawa stable and he joined in January 2005. This was the same time that future ōzeki Gōeidō also joined the stable.

== Career ==
Initially fighting under his own surname of Kadamoto, he won the jonidan championship in his second full tournament with a perfect 7–0 record. He recorded only one make-koshi or losing score on his way to elite sekitori status, which he achieved two years after his debut, upon promotion to the jūryō division in January 2007. To mark the occasion he adopted his present ring name of Toyohibiki. The "toyo" part of his ring name came from the name of his home area of Toyoura (the same "toyo" also being the first character in his mother's name Toyomi) and the second part came from the name of his high school, Yamaguchi Hibiki. He won the jūryō championship in his debut tournament with a 10–5 record, in a three-way playoff and despite losing the initial bout. He then reached the top makuuchi division for the first time in July 2007.

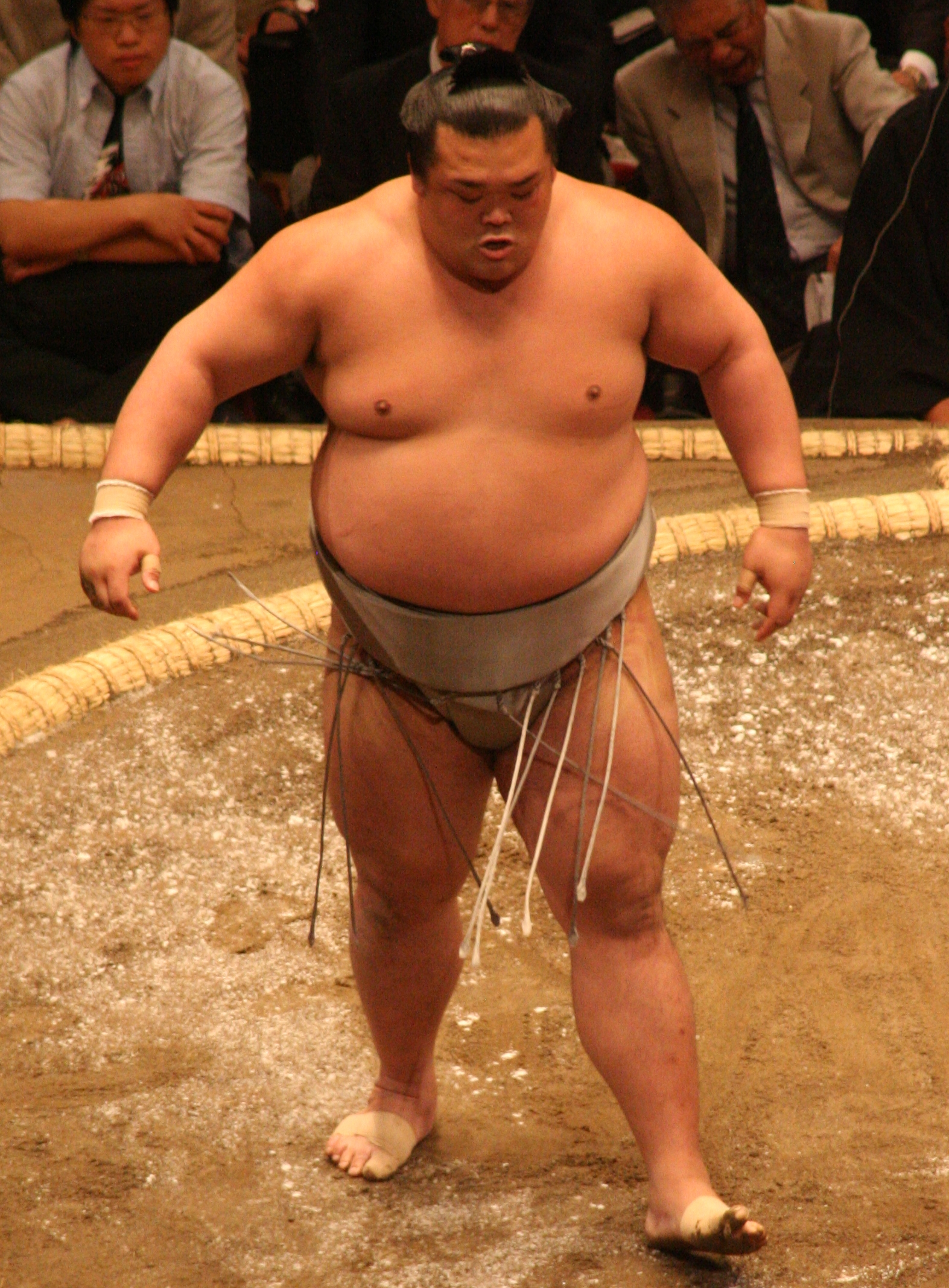
Toyohibiki in May 2009

Toyohibiki produced a strong 11–4 record on his debut in makuuchi and was awarded the Fighting Spirit prize. He was one of seven wrestlers who NHK commentator Shuhei Nagao (the former Mainoumi) in 2008 called the "Seven Samurai" and identified as "holding the key" to a Japanese resurgence in sumo, which was dominated by foreigners in the top ranks. (The others were his stablemate Gōeidō, Kisenosato, Kotoshogiku, Homasho, Toyonoshima and Tochiozan). In the next four tournaments after his top division debut, he did not manage a majority of wins against losses. His 5–10 score in the March 2008 tournament, after losing to his first seven opponents, sent him to the bottom of makuuchi and placed him in danger of demotion from the top division altogether. In May 2008 he won six of his first seven bouts and though he stumbled rather through the rest of the tournament he did finally record a winning score of 8–7. In July 2008 he was on the tournament leaderboard into the second week and finished on 10–5, winning his second Fighting Spirit Prize. In November 2008 he reached his highest rank to date of maegashira 2, but he had to sit out the tournament due to a detached retina in his left eye.

Toyohibiki returned to action in January 2009 but could win only five bouts, resulting in demotion back to the jūryō division. He bounced back with a 12 – 3 victory in the jūryō division in the Haru basho in Osaka on March 29, 2009, his second yusho in the division, which returned him immediately to makuuchi. He produced a strong 11–4 record at maegashira 11 in the May 2009 tournament, and was promoted back to maegashira 2 for the July tourney.

In the January 2010 tournament he broke a run of three consecutive make-koshi that had seen him slip to maegashira 16 by finishing joint runner-up (alongside Hakuho and Baruto) on 12–3, and he was awarded the Fighting Spirit prize for the third time. He was suspended along with over a dozen other wrestlers from the July 2010 tournament after admitting involvement in illegal betting on baseball. As a result, he fell to the jūryō division in September. After two tournaments in the second division he returned to makuuchi in January 2011.

In the May 2012 tournament he recorded his first victory over a yokozuna, defeating Hakuho by kotenage or armlock throw. The referee initially awarded the match to Hakuho, but the judges overturned the decision.

He largely alternated winning and losing tournaments during the period in which he was a makuuchi regular, and had one of the longest tenures among active members of the top division without ever making san'yaku. He fell to jūryō in September 2015 for the first time since his suspension in 2010 but made an immediate return to makuuchi. His "up and down" form continued in 2016 as he was relegated after the March tournament, returned to the top division in July and was relegated again after a 6–9 record in November. He won promotion back to makuuchi after the March 2017 tournament where he took his third jūryō championship after winning a three-way playoff when he, Osunaarashi and Asanoyama all finished on 10–5. However he was immediately demoted back to jūryō after a 4–11 record in May. He did not enter the January 2018 tournament because of the detection of an irregular heartbeat. This resulted in him dropping to the makushita division, and he never managed to return to the sekitori ranks. He had knee surgery in December 2020, and did not return to active competition.

== Retirement from sumo ==
Toyohibiki retired in June 2021. He is staying in sumo as an elder of the Japan Sumo Association under the elder name of Yamashina. His retirement ceremony was held at the Ryōgoku Kokugikan on 29 January 2023.

== Fighting style ==
One of the heaviest men in the top division at 185 kg (408 lb), Toyohibiki was a wrestler with great power but he also had suspect footwork. He favoured pushing techniques, using his weight to his best advantage. Of his victories in his last six tournaments, 45 percent were by oshi-dashi, or a simple push out. He was not fond of grips on the mawashi, winning only 15 percent by yori-kiri or force out during the same period.

== Career record ==
Toyohibiki Ryūta
Year	January Hatsu basho, Tokyo	March Haru basho, Osaka	May Natsu basho, Tokyo	July Nagoya basho, Nagoya	September Aki basho, Tokyo	November Kyūshū basho, Fukuoka
2005	(Maezumo)	East Jonokuchi #32; 5–2	East Jonidan #94; 7–0; Champion	West Sandanme #86; 6–1	West Sandanme #29; 5–2	East Sandanme #7; 6–1
2006	West Makushita #32; 3–4	East Makushita #40; 6–1	East Makushita #17; 4–3	East Makushita #12; 5–2	East Makushita #8; 5–2	West Makushita #3; 4–3
2007	East Jūryō #14; 10–5–PPP; Champion	West Jūryō #8; 8–7	West Jūryō #6; 10–5	West Maegashira #14; 11–4; F	East Maegashira #6; 7–8	East Maegashira #7; 7–8
2008	West Maegashira #8; 6–9	East Maegashira #11; 5–10	West Maegashira #15; 8–7	East Maegashira #13; 10–5; F	East Maegashira #5; 8–7	East Maegashira #2; Sat out due to injury 0–0–15
2009	East Maegashira #14; 5–10	West Jūryō #3; 12–3; Champion	West Maegashira #11; 11–4	West Maegashira #2; 3–12	West Maegashira #9; 6–9	West Maegashira #12; 5–10
2010	West Maegashira #16; 12–3; F	East Maegashira #5; 4–11	West Maegashira #8; 8–7	West Maegashira #6; Suspended; 0–0–15	West Jūryō #3; 7–8	West Jūryō #4; 11–4–PP
2011	West Maegashira #15; 9–6	Tournament Cancelled; 0–0–0	West Maegashira #12; 7–8	West Maegashira #12; 8–7	West Maegashira #8; 6–9	East Maegashira #11; 9–6
2012	West Maegashira #5; 7–8	West Maegashira #7; 9–6	East Maegashira #3; 5–10 ★	West Maegashira #7; 9–6	West Maegashira #4; 7–8	West Maegashira #5; 9–6
2013	East Maegashira #3; 5–10	West Maegashira #7; 6–9	West Maegashira #10; 8–7	East Maegashira #8; 9–6	East Maegashira #4; 6–9	East Maegashira #7; 9–6
2014	West Maegashira #3; 5–10	East Maegashira #7; 6–9	East Maegashira #11; 8–7	West Maegashira #8; 8–7	East Maegashira #5; 8–7	West Maegashira #2; 5–10
2015	West Maegashira #6; 3–12	East Maegashira #15; 8–7	West Maegashira #12; 6–9	East Maegashira #14; 5–10	East Jūryō #3; 10–5	West Maegashira #13; 7–8
2016	West Maegashira #14; 8–7	East Maegashira #9; 3–12	East Jūryō #2; 9–6	East Maegashira #13; 7–8	West Maegashira #13; 6–9	West Maegashira #15; 6–9
2017	East Jūryō #1; 6–9	West Jūryō #3; 10–5–PP; Champion	East Maegashira #13; 4–11	East Jūryō #2; 6–9	West Jūryō #4; 4–11	West Jūryō #11; 8–7
2018	West Jūryō #9; Sat out due to injury 0–0–15	East Makushita #9; 2–5	East Makushita #20; 4–3	West Makushita #14; 6–1	East Makushita #3; 4–3	East Makushita #2; 3–4
2019	West Makushita #5; 2–5	West Makushita #11; 4–3	East Makushita #9; 3–4	West Makushita #13; 4–3	West Makushita #10; 3–4	West Makushita #15; 4–3
2020	East Makushita #10; 4–3	East Makushita #6; 3–4	East Makushita #10; Tournament Cancelled; 0–0–0	East Makushita #10; 3–4	East Makushita #14; 3–4	East Makushita #21; 3–4
2021	West Makushita #31; Sat out due to injury 0–0–7	West Sandanme #11; Sat out due to injury 0–0–7	West Sandanme #71; Sat out due to injury 0–0–7	West Jonidan #31; Retired –	x	x
Record given as wins–losses–absences Top division champion Top division runner-up Retired Lower divisions Non-participation Sanshō key: F=Fighting spirit; O=Outstanding performance; T=Technique Also shown: ★=Kinboshi; P=Playoff(s); Divisions: Makuuchi — Jūryō — Makushita — Sandanme — Jonidan — Jonokuchi Makuuchi ranks: Yokozuna — Ōzeki — Sekiwake — Komusubi — Maegashira

== See also ==
- List of sumo tournament second division champions
- Glossary of sumo terms
- List of past sumo wrestlers
