= Sadanoumi Kōji =

Japanese sumo wrestler

Personal information
- Native name: 佐田の海 鴻嗣
- Born: Hiroshi Matsumara; 19 July 1956 (age 70) Sakai, Osaka, Japan
- Height: 1.81 m (5 ft 11 1/2 in)
- Weight: 126 kg (278 lb)

Sport
- Sport: Sumo
- Retired: July, 1988
- Heya: Dewanoumi
- Record: 544-581-7
- Debut: March, 1972
- Highest rank: Komusubi (January, 1982)
- Elder name: Tagonoura
- Championships: 1 (Makushita); 1 (Jonokuchi)
- Special Prizes: Outstanding Performance (1); Fighting Spirit (2); Technique (1)
- Updated on June 25, 2020

Sadanoumi Kōji (佐田の海 鴻嗣) (born 19 July 1956 as Kōji Matsumara (松村 宏司, Matsumura Kōji)) is a former sumo wrestler from Sakai, Osaka, Japan. He made his professional debut in March 1972, and reached the top division in November 1980. His highest rank was komusubi. He retired in July 1988 and became an elder in the Japan Sumo Association under the name Tagonoura. He left the Sumo Association in August 1999. He is the father of the current sekitori wrestler of the same name, Sadanoumi Takashi.

== Career record ==
Sadanoumi Kōji
Year	January Hatsu basho, Tokyo	March Haru basho, Osaka	May Natsu basho, Tokyo	July Nagoya basho, Nagoya	September Aki basho, Tokyo	November Kyūshū basho, Fukuoka
1972	x	(Maezumo)	West Jonokuchi #6; 6–1; Champion	West Jonidan #29; 2–5	East Jonidan #48; 5–2	West Jonidan #14; 2–5
1973	East Jonidan #37; 6–1	East Sandanme #64; 4–3	West Sandanme #53; 6–1	East Jonidan #2; 4–3	West Sandanme #65; 5–2	West Sandanme #38; 5–2
1974	East Sandanme #10; 2–5	East Sandanme #26; 3–4	West Sandanme #39; 6–1	West Sandanme #3; 5–2	West Makushita #37; 2–5	East Makushita #53; 4–3
1975	West Makushita #43; 3–4	East Makushita #52; 3–4	East Sandanme #3; 5–2	West Makushita #43; 5–2	West Makushita #25; 2–5	East Makushita #41; 4–3
1976	West Makushita #34; 6–1	East Makushita #16; 4–3	East Makushita #11; 2–5	East Makushita #26; 5–2	West Makushita #14; 4–3	West Makushita #8; 5–2
1977	West Makushita #4; 3–4	West Makushita #8; 2–5	East Makushita #24; 3–4	East Makushita #31; 6–1	East Makushita #11; 4–3	East Makushita #7; 5–2
1978	West Makushita #3; 5–2	West Jūryō #10; 3–12	East Makushita #8; 5–2	East Makushita #2; 5–2	West Jūryō #13; 2–13	West Makushita #15; 4–3
1979	East Makushita #11; 4–3	West Makushita #6; 4–3	West Makushita #3; 3–4	West Makushita #7; 7–0–P; Champion	West Jūryō #8; 8–7	East Jūryō #7; 8–7
1980	West Jūryō #4; 6–9	West Jūryō #9; 8–7	East Jūryō #8; 7–8	East Jūryō #10; 9–6	West Jūryō #4; 11–4	West Maegashira #12; 11–4; F
1981	East Maegashira #2; 4–11	East Maegashira #10; 8–7	West Maegashira #7; 9–6	East Maegashira #2; 4–11	East Maegashira #8; 9–6	East Maegashira #4; 10–5; T
1982	East Komusubi #1; 8–7; O	East Komusubi #1; 4–11	East Maegashira #4; 5–10	West Maegashira #11; 6–9	East Maegashira #14; 9–6	West Maegashira #6; 8–7
1983	West Maegashira #2; 6–9	East Maegashira #5; 5–10	West Maegashira #9; 8–7	West Maegashira #3; 6–9	West Maegashira #6; 9–6	East Komusubi #1; 5–10
1984	West Maegashira #5; 9–6	West Komusubi #1; 7–8	West Maegashira #1; 4–11	West Maegashira #10; 10–5	East Maegashira #3; 5–10	West Maegashira #8; 9–6
1985	West Maegashira #2; 3–12	East Maegashira #13; 10–5; F	West Maegashira #4; 5–10	West Maegashira #11; 9–6	East Maegashira #3; 6–9	West Maegashira #7; 9–6
1986	West Maegashira #1; 5–10	West Maegashira #6; 7–8	East Maegashira #8; 8–7	West Maegashira #4; 6–9	West Maegashira #9; 8–7	West Maegashira #3; 3–12
1987	West Maegashira #12; 8–7	West Maegashira #8; 8–7	East Maegashira #4; 4–11	East Maegashira #11; 9–6	West Maegashira #3; 3–12	East Maegashira #11; 8–7
1988	East Maegashira #9; 7–8	West Maegashira #10; 0–15	West Jūryō #6; 6–9	West Jūryō #11; Retired; 2–4–7	x	x
Record given as wins–losses–absences Top division champion Top division runner-up Retired Lower divisions Non-participation Sanshō key: F=Fighting spirit; O=Outstanding performance; T=Technique Also shown: ★=Kinboshi; P=Playoff(s); Divisions: Makuuchi — Jūryō — Makushita — Sandanme — Jonidan — Jonokuchi Makuuchi ranks: Yokozuna — Ōzeki — Sekiwake — Komusubi — Maegashira

== See also ==
- Glossary of sumo terms
- List of past sumo wrestlers
- List of komusubi
