= Sakaigawa stable =

Organization of sumo wrestlers

Coordinates: 35.8161°N 139.7688°E

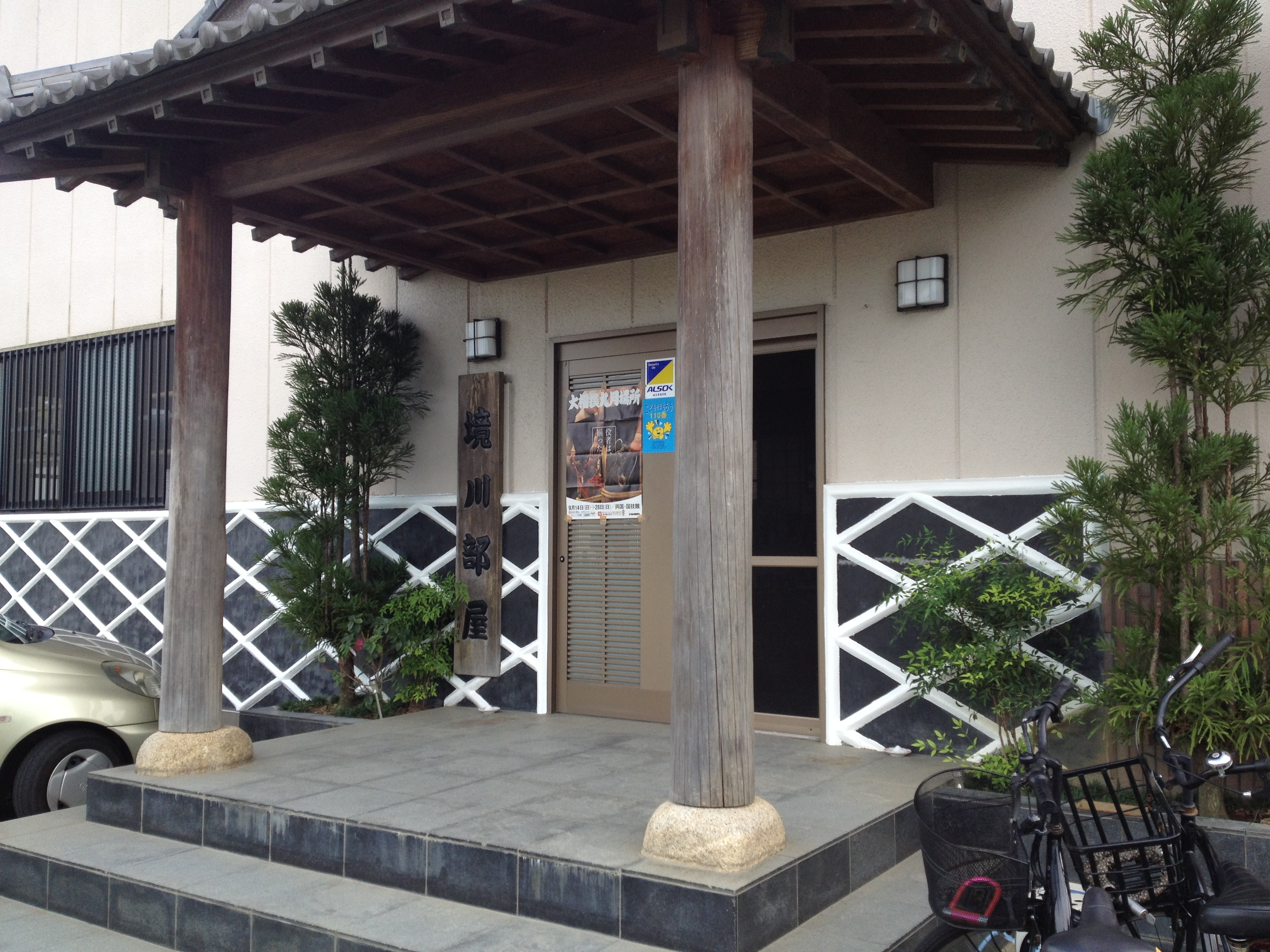

Sakaigawa stable (境川部屋, Sakaigawa-beya) is a stable of sumo wrestlers, part of the Dewanoumi group of stables. It was established in its modern form on 25 May 1998 by former komusubi Ryōgoku Kajinosuke IV, who branched off from Dewanoumi stable. It was originally called Nakadachi stable, but when Sakaigawa (the 50th yokozuna Sadanoyama) reached the Japan Sumo Association's mandatory retirement age in February 2003, he passed on the Sakaigawa name, and the stable was renamed.

As of May 2026, the stable has 24 active wrestlers.

The stable is known for its rigorous training. At the heart of the stable are written ten rules, these having been written by the master (Ryōgoku) and Ōnaruto (Yoshinotani) at the time of the stable's foundation. It has become traditional for wrestlers to recite them at the end of training.

In July 2005, Satsuki, a sandanme wrestler encountered a fire in Aichi Prefecture during the Nagoya tournament, used a ladder to rescue a woman on the second floor. He left the scene without telling his name, but later received a letter of appreciation from the Aichi Konan Fire Department. In June 2020, wrestlers from the stable saved another person while being among a group of 20 people who helped rescue a woman from drowning in a nearby river in an apparent suicide attempt. The Takenotsuka Metropolitan Police Department issued a letter of appreciation to the stable.

In April 2021, the stable's 28 year-old sandanme wrestler Hibikiryū died after he fell on his head during a tournament bout on March 26. The long hesitation of those around the dohyō before Hibikiryū finally received professional medical attention several minutes later shocked spectators and raised criticism online and in the media about sumo proceedings, which prompted the Japanese Sumo Association to study a modification of procedure.

In February 2022, Takekuma (ōzeki Gōeidō) broke off from the stable to establish the Takekuma stable.

== Ring name conventions ==
Many wrestlers at this stable take ring names or shikona that begin with the characters 佐田 (read: sada), in honor of the original holder of the Sakaigawa kabu (title), the 50th yokozuna Sadanoyama Shinmatsu.

== Owner ==
- 1998–present: 13th Sakaigawa (yakuin taigū iin, komusubi Ryōgoku, born 1962)

== Coaches ==
- Furiwake Yasunari (toshiyori, sekiwake Myōgiryū, born 1986)
- Sekinoto Ryūta (iin, komusubi Iwakiyama, born 1976)
- Yamashina Ryūta (iin, maegashira Toyohibiki, born 1984)
- Tatsutagawa Kokan (toshiyori, maegashira Hōchiyama, born 1982)

== Notable active wrestlers ==
- Hiradoumi (best rank komusubi, born 2000)
- Sadanoumi (best rank maegashira, born 1987)
- Tsushimanada (best rank jūryō, born 1993)
- Nishinoryū (best rank jūryō, born 2000)

== Notable past wrestlers ==
- Gōeidō (ōzeki, born 1986)
- Myōgiryū (sekiwake, born 1986)
- Iwakiyama (komusubi, born 1976)
- Sadanofuji (maegashira 2, born 1984)
- Toyohibiki (maegashira 2, born 1984)
- Hōchiyama (maegashira 14, born 1984)

== Usher ==
- Yūji (sandanme yobidashi, real name Yūki Tabata, born 1997)

== Hairdresser ==
- Tokoryū (second class tokoyama, born 1984)
- Tokoteru (third class tokoyama, born 1993)

== Location and access ==
Tokyo, Adachi ward, Toneri 4-3-1

== See also ==
- List of sumo stables
- List of active sumo wrestlers
- List of past sumo wrestlers
- Glossary of sumo terms
