= Gōeidō Gōtarō =

Sumo wrestler

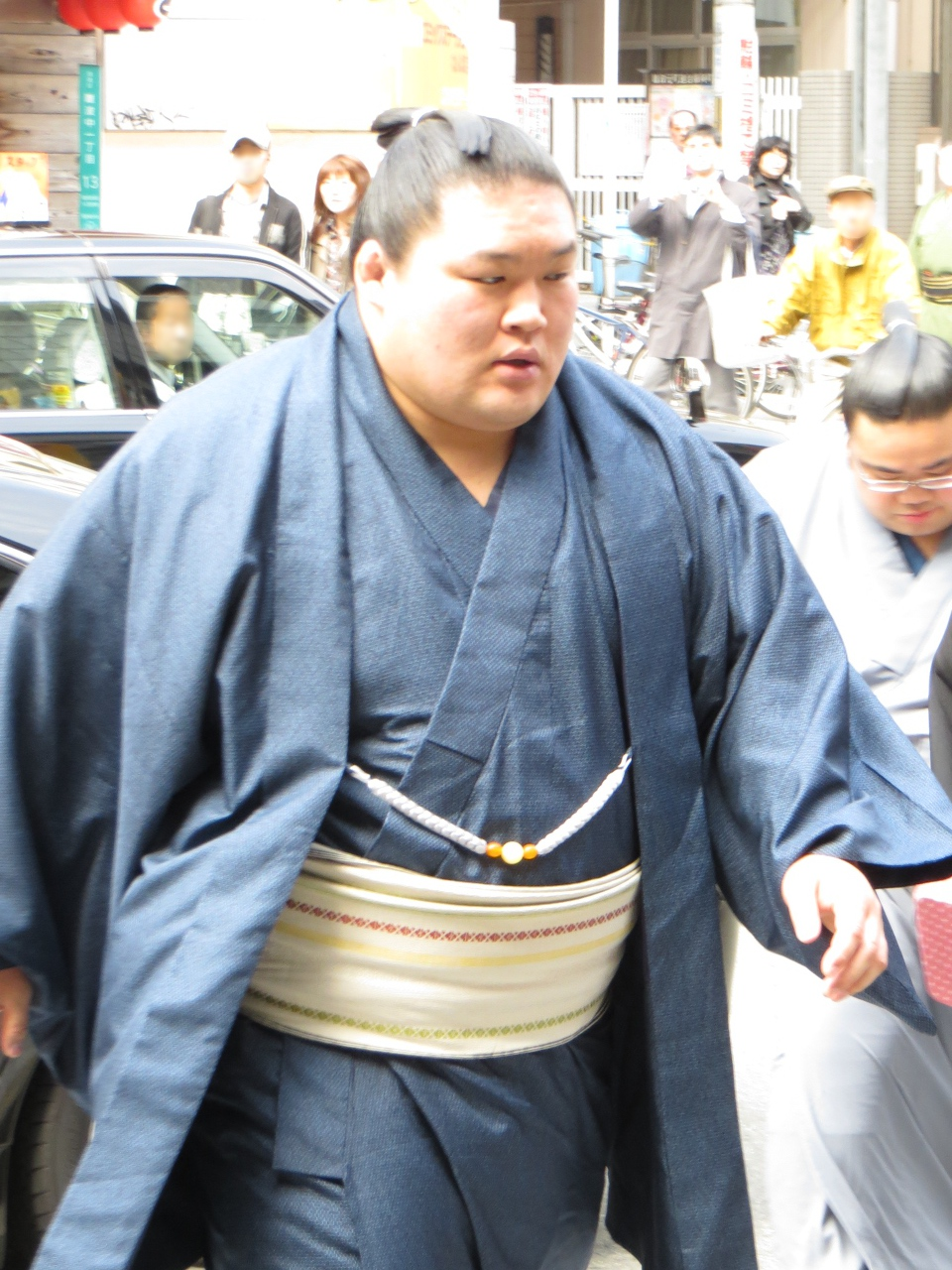

Personal information
- Native name: 豪栄道 豪太郎
- Born: Gōtarō Sawai; April 6, 1986 (age 40) Neyagawa, Osaka, Japan
- Height: 1.83 m (6 ft 0 in)
- Weight: 161 kg (355 lb; 25.4 st)

Sport
- Sport: Sumo
- Retired: January 2020
- Heya: Sakaigawa
- Record: 696-493-66
- Debut: January 2005
- Highest rank: Ōzeki (September 2014)
- Elder name: Takekuma
- Championships: 1 (Makuuchi); 2 (Makushita); 1 (Sandanme); 1 (Jonokuchi)
- Special Prizes: Fighting Spirit (3) Outstanding Performance (5) Technique (3)
- Gold Stars: 1 (Asashōryū)
- Updated on Jan 28, 2020

Gōeidō Gōtarō (豪栄道 豪太郎; born April 6, 1986 as Gōtarō Sawai (澤井 豪太郎, Sawai Gōtarō)) is a former sumo wrestler from Osaka Prefecture, Japan. He made his professional debut in January 2005 and reached the top makuuchi division in September 2007. Long regarded as one of the most promising Japanese wrestlers in sumo, Gōeidō holds the modern record for the most consecutive appearances at sumo's third highest rank of sekiwake, at 14 tournaments. He was finally promoted to the rank of ōzeki following the July 2014 tournament, after scores of twelve wins against three losses in two of the previous three tournaments. However, he only managed to win ten or more bouts in a tournament as an ōzeki on six occasions, and was kadoban, or in danger of demotion, eight times. He won his only top division tournament in September 2016 with a perfect 15–0 record and was a runner-up seven times in his career. He retired in January 2020 after two consecutive losing records that would have seen him demoted, to become an elder of the Japan Sumo Association under the name of Takekuma.

== Early life and sumo background ==
Born in Neyagawa, Sawai began sumo in his first year of primary school. He was well known for being a strong contender from the beginning, and was encouraged by his family to take on older and bigger boys to improve his sumo even further. In junior high, his light weight compared to most of his contemporaries held him back and demoralized him. However, he made the decision to attend Saitama Sakae High School which had a well-known sumo program. With a new found determination and a supportive coach, he won 11 national titles. At the 53rd All Japan Sumo Championships held at the Ryōgoku Kokugikan in December 2004, in which he was the only high school student to compete, he finished in the top four. He made his professional debut one month later in January 2005, joining the Sakaigawa stable.

== Career ==
=== Early career ===
He initially fought under his own surname of Sawai. He moved through the lower ranks quickly and took the championship in the third highest makushita division in September 2006 with a perfect 7–0 record, which earned him promotion to the second highest jūryō division. At this point he adopted the shikona of Gōeidō.

=== Makuuchi career ===
Gōeidō was promoted to the top makuuchi division after a 12–3 score and runner-up honours at the rank of jūryō 5 in July 2007. He had a very successful top division debut, leading the race for the championship after the 11th day with a score of 10–1. Pitted against higher ranked opposition on the next three days, he lost to Ama, ōzeki Chiyotaikai and yokozuna Hakuhō. He was the first makuuchi debutant to face a yokozuna since Tosanoumi in 1995. He ended the tournament with an 11–4 score and was awarded the Fighting Spirit prize. In the November tournament he won six of his first seven bouts, and though he began losing in the second week he still finished with a majority of wins (8–7).

He was promoted up the ranks to maegashira 3 in January 2008. For this tournament he faced all the top-ranked men at the beginning instead of during the second week as had been the case in his debut. He fell short with five wins against ten losses, although did upset ōzeki Kotomitsuki on the third day. After this tournament he was named as one of seven wrestlers who NHK commentator Shuhei Nagao (the former Mainoumi) called the "Seven Samurai" and identified as "holding the key" to a Japanese resurgence in sumo, which was dominated by foreigners in the top ranks. (The others were his stablemate Toyohibiki, Kisenosato, Kotoshogiku, Homasho, Toyonoshima and Tochiozan). Back at maegashira 8 for the March 2008 tournament, he clinched his kachi-koshi score of 8–7 with victory on the final day. He produced the same score in the May 2008 tournament, in which his best result was a victory over tournament runner-up Toyonoshima.

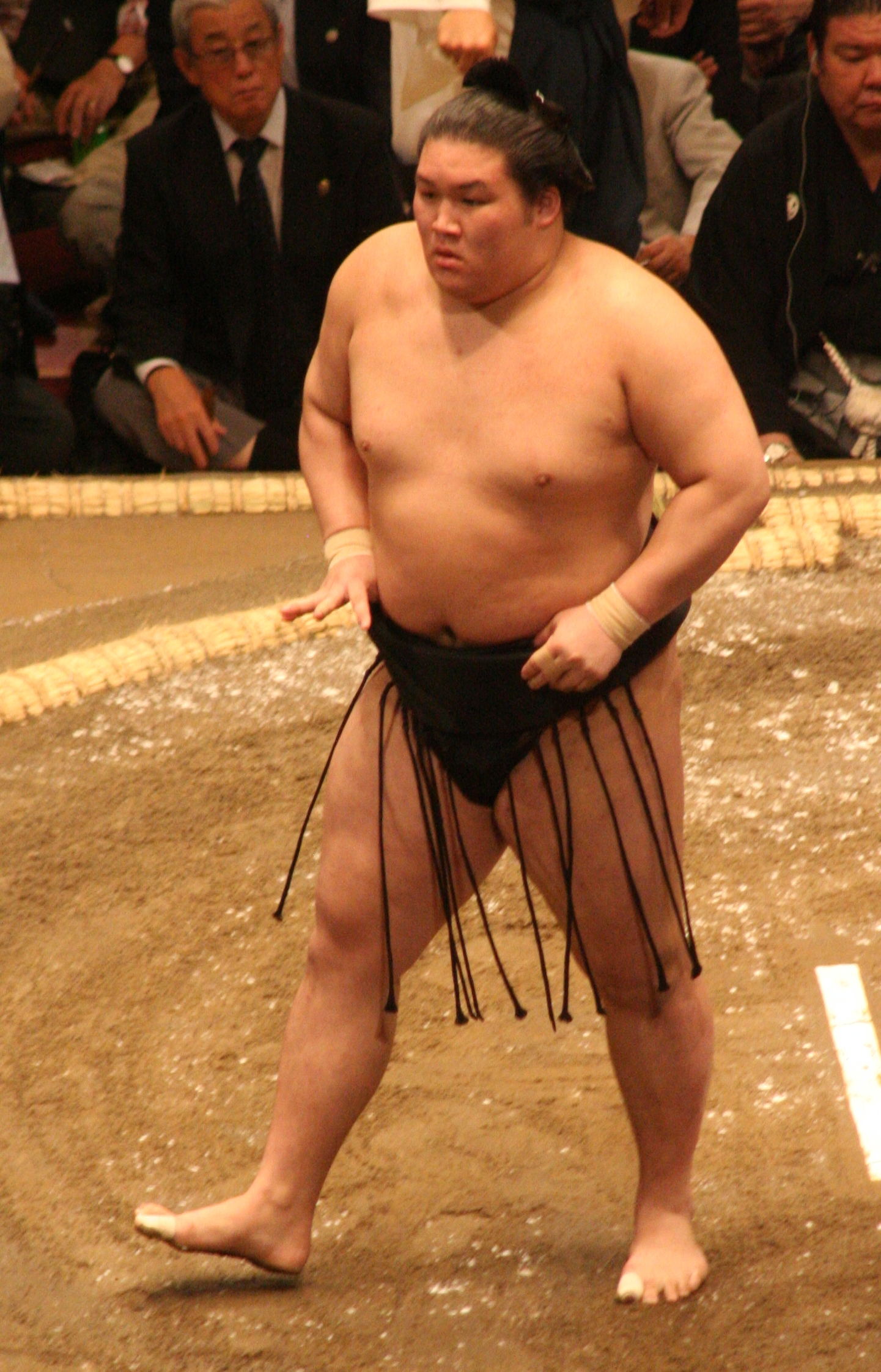
Goeido in May 2009

In the September 2008 tournament he was the tournament co-leader with only one loss up to Day 10, although he lost four of his last five matches. He did defeat tournament runner-up Ama for the first time on Day 14 and finished with a strong 10–5 record. He was awarded his second Fighting Spirit prize and was promoted to a san'yaku position at komusubi for the November 2008 tournament. He could only win one bout in the first ten days (over Ama once again) and finished with a 5–10 score.

In the January 2009 tournament he won ten bouts from the maegashira 3 ranking, earning his first Technique prize and promotion back to komusubi. His second attempt at komusubi, in his hometown tournament, proved more successful and he compiled a 9–6 score which included a first win in five attempts over Kotoōshū and two other victories over ōzeki. This earned him promotion to sekiwake for the first time for the May 2009 tournament. He began the tournament brightly, defeating three ōzeki in the first three days (the best start by a new sekiwake since Tochinowaka in September 1987), but he faded after that and recorded a disappointing 6–9. Ranked at maegashira 1 in July, he could only score 5–10. In August he had endoscopic surgery on his right elbow. Despite this, he fought his way to a 10–5 record in the September tournament after a poor start, and returned to komusubi for the Kyushu tournament in November. After scoring only seven wins there he was demoted back to the maegashira ranks.

In January 2010 he earned his first kinboshi by defeating Asashōryū on Day 5. This was his first victory over a yokozuna, discounting a win by default in September 2008. However a defeat to Aminishiki on the final day meant he finished on 7–8 and he missed out on the Outstanding Performance prize as a result. He was forced to pull out of the March tournament, his first career withdrawal, after injuring his left knee in a defeat to Hōmashō Noriyuki on Day 5.

He was suspended along with over a dozen other wrestlers from the July 2010 tournament after admitting involvement in illegal betting on baseball. As a result, he fell to the jūryō division in September. Ranked at jūryō 1 he had no problem in securing an immediate return to the top division by scoring 12–3. In the May 2011 'technical examination' tournament he defeated all four ōzeki and was awarded his second Technique prize. His 11–4 score meant he scored double-digit wins from the maegashira ranks in three consecutive tournaments, a feat previous achieved by only three wrestlers (Yoshibayama, Dewanishiki and Wakachichibu) and not seen for 49 years. However, his return to the san'yaku ranks in the July 2011 tournament was unsuccessful as he lost eight of his first nine bouts, finishing on 5–10.

Gōeidō's best result for some time came in the March 2012 tournament in Osaka, where he finished on 12–3 and won his third Fighting Spirit award. He was promoted to sekiwake for the second time, three years after his debut at the rank. During the tournament he defeated Hakuhō for the first time in 14 attempts, handing the struggling yokozuna his third defeat of the basho. He also defeated three ōzeki during the tournament and was awarded his first Outstanding Performance Prize. In the November 2012 tournament Gōeidō achieved double digit wins in a san'yaku rank for the first time, scoring 11–4 and winning his third Technique Award. He remained at sekiwake for the July 2013 tournament despite only scoring seven wins in May, because of the lack of qualified candidates to take his slot. This had also been the case in September 2012, and Gōeidō is the first wrestler to see this happen to him twice.

Gōeidō finished runner-up to Kakuryū on 12–3 and won his third Outstanding Performance Prize. In the July 2014 tournament, he logged his fourteenth consecutive appearance at sekiwake a modern age record, passing up Kaiō's thirteen. He finished 12–3, beating two yokozuna and two ōzeki and earning another Outstanding Performance Prize (his 3rd in a row).

=== Ōzeki career ===
In recognition of his continued outstanding performance at sekiwake he was promoted to ōzeki for the September 2014 tournament despite having a mediocre 8–7 record in the May tournament and only 32 wins in his last 3 tournaments when 33 is generally the standard for promotion. He turned in an unimpressive 8–7 (with one win by default) in his ōzeki debut followed by a disastrous 5–10 in the November tournament, leaving him in danger of demotion (kadoban) in the upcoming January 2015 tournament. A 7–8 record in September 2015 saw him kadoban for the second time in less than a year. After recording wins over Terunofuji, Kakuryū and Kisenosato he escaped demotion on the final day of the November 2015 tournament with a victory over Tochiōzan which saw him end with an 8–7 record. However, another losing record (4–11) in January 2016 meant he would be kadoban for the third time in the March 2016 tournament. Fighting in front of his hometown supporters Gōeidō produced a career best effort to record 12 wins including victories over the yokozuna Kakuryū and Harumafuji and was in contention for the championship until losing to Kisenosato on the final day. It was the first time in his ōzeki career that had scored ten wins or more. He managed nine wins in May but a defeat to Kisenosato on the final day of the July tournament saw him kadoban for the fourth time.

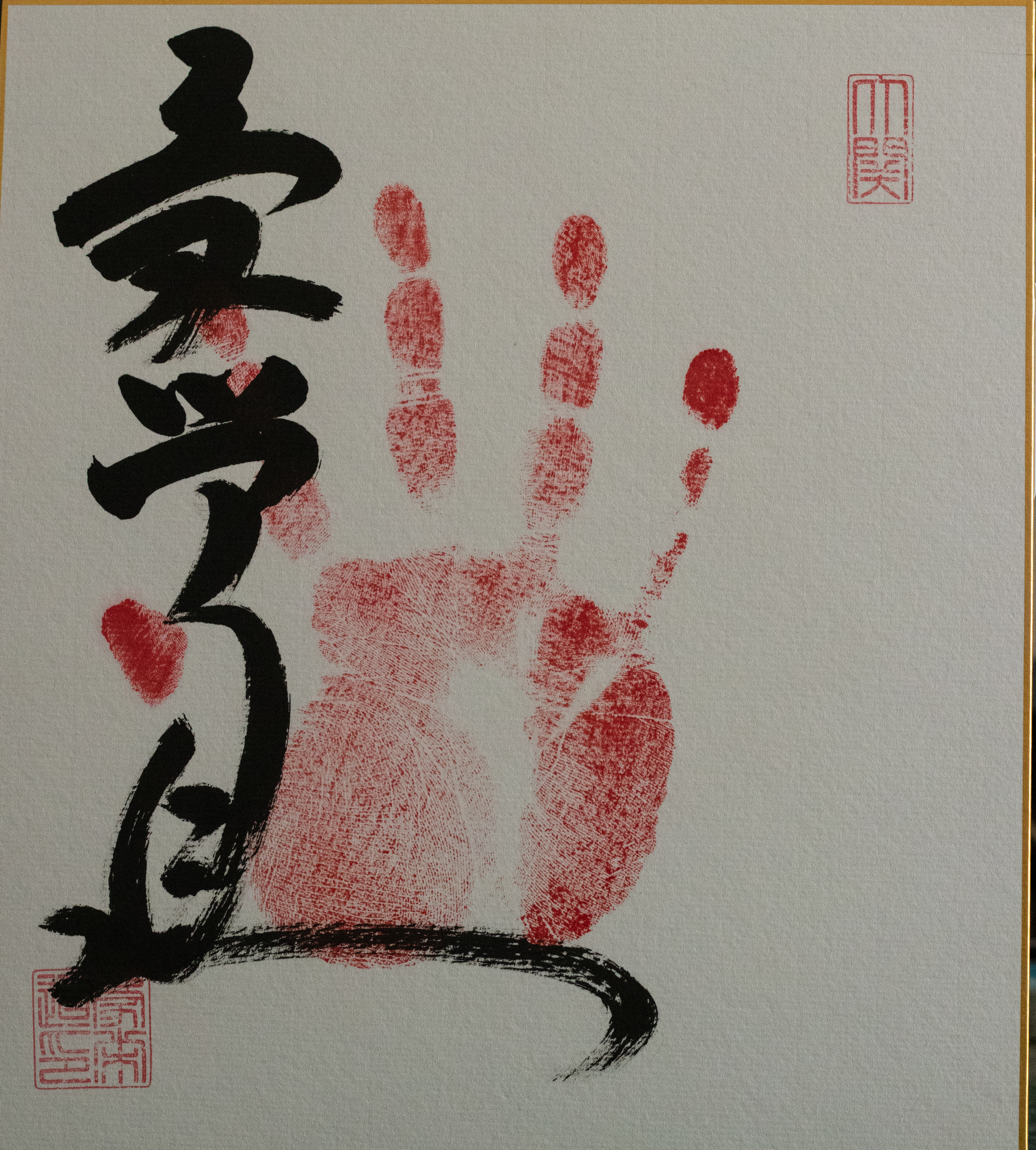
Goeido Ozeki original tegata (handprint & signature)

In September 2016 Gōeidō started strongly with six straight wins including victories over komusubi Tochiōzan and both sekiwake (Takarafuji and Takayasu). He gained the sole lead in the tournament with a victory over Okinoumi on day seven and went on to secure his ōzeki rank by beating Yoshikaze a day later. In the tournament's second week he maintained his unbeaten run with wins over his fellow ōzeki Terunofuji and Kisenosato and the yokozuna Kakuryū to open up a two-win lead over his rivals. On day thirteen he defeated Harumafuji with a neck throw (kubinage) meaning that he needed only one win in the last two days to secure his first tournament victory. On September 24, the penultimate day of the tournament Gōeidō clinched the title with a force-out (yorikiri) win over Tamawashi. After his win he commented, "I just focused on wrestling as hard as I could. I’m really happy. There was a time when things didn’t go my way, but I’m glad I stuck it out. I concentrated on my performance and took it one bout at a time, which led to this result". When asked about his prospects of advancing to yokozuna he added "I really can't think about it right now. I want to soak up the moment for a little bit". He was the first wrestler from Osaka to win a top division championship since Yamanishiki in 1930. On the final day he completed a zenshō-yūshō with a win over Kotoshōgiku. He was the first wrestler to win his first championship with a 15–0 record since Musashimaru in 1994, at 30 years five months he was the fifth oldest first-time yūshō winner, and he was the first to win with a 15–0 record as a kadoban ōzeki.

Gōeidō won his first five bouts in the following Kyūshū tournament, but then was defeated by komusubi Tamawashi on Day 6. On Day 8 against sekiwake Okinoumi he was forced to the edge of the ring but with his left heel back on the straw bales he threw his opponent down. The referee awarded the bout to Gōeidō but the judges overruled his decision, with the chief judge Tomozuna announcing to the crowd that in his opinion Gōeido's body was already out of the ring (shini-tai) before Okinoumi hit the ground. Gōeidō's promotion hopes were ended by a third defeat to fellow ōzeki Kisenosato on Day 9. Gōeidō went on to win the next three days, but then lost the final three days where he faced all three yokozuna. Gōeidō finished the tournament with a 9–6 record, dashing his hopes of perhaps being under consideration for promotion in January.

He withdrew from the January 2017 tournament on Day 13 having injured his right ankle in a defeat to Endō the previous day. His withdrawal gave a win by default to the tournament leader Kisenosato. He was still troubled by the injury in the March tournament in Osaka and pulled out on the sixth day having suffered four straight losses. He retained his status with nine wins in May but went kadoban for the sixth time after a 7–8 record in July. The September 2017 tournament saw Gōeidō as the only ōzeki participant with Takayasu withdrawing on Day 3 and Terunofuji on Day 6. After losing his opening match he then won ten in a row to stand as the clear tournament leader on 10–1, two wins ahead of rank-and-filers Chiyotairyu, Asanoyama and Takanoiwa on 8–3. He lost two of his next three matches but still went into the final day one win ahead of the only yokozuna in the tournament, Harumafuji. However, Harumafuji defeated him twice, once in their regulation match and again in a playoff after both finished with 11–4 records. Although he missed out on his second yūshō this was Gōeido's first runner-up performance as an ōzeki and only the third time he has recorded double-digit wins at the rank. He withdrew from the May 2018 with an ankle injury after suffering five defeats in the first eight days. With his fellow ōzeki Takayasu also absent, this marked the first time since 15-day tournaments began in 1949 that two ōzeki had withdrawn. In September 2018 he was a runner-up for the second time as an ōzeki, and seventh time in his career, with a 12–3 record. He withdrew on Day 12 of the following tournament in November with a right arm injury, having already secured his majority of wins. He produced a 12–3 score in March 2019, although it was only good enough for third place behind Hakuhō on 15–0 and Ichinojō on 14–1. In July he withdrew from the tournament on Day 7 having already suffered four defeats, citing a right shoulder injury. He withdrew from the November 2019 tournament after sustaining a left ankle injury in his opening day defeat to Endo.

=== Rivalry with Tochiōzan ===
Gōeidō joined professional sumo at the same time as Tochiōzan, who Gōeidō had fought a number of times in high school amateur sumo competitions and regarded as his chief rival. In his first professional bout on 15 March 2005 Gōeidō defeated Tochiōzan who was also making his debut. He reached sekitori status one tournament later than Tochiōzan, who also preceded him into the top division. Gōeidō made his sekiwake debut in the same tournament that Tochiōzan made his debut at komusubi. In their head-to-head clashes in professional sumo, Gōeidō led 25–14, including a win by default, and won their last six encounters until a day 3 defeat in the 2018 Kyūshū Basho. They are also scheduled to have their retirement ceremonies on the same weekend in January 2022.

== Retirement from sumo ==
Entering the January 2020 tournament as a kadoban ōzeki, Gōeidō suffered his eighth loss in his Day 12 match against Asanoyama. He chose to retire rather than be demoted to sekiwake for the March 2020 tournament in his native prefecture of Ōsaka. The Sumo Association's head of Public Relations, Shibatayama Oyakata said on 27 January that he had received word of Gōeidō's decision from his stablemaster, Sakaigawa, and the following day it was confirmed that Gōeidō would be taking the toshiyori name of Takekuma Oyakata. He was the first to retire at the ōzeki rank since Kaiō in 2011, and this left only one ōzeki on the banzuke for the first time in 38 years. Gōeidō retired having been ōzeki for 33 straight tournament, the tenth highest in history. At a press conference on 29 January he said, "A few years back, I promised myself I'd retire when I fell from ozeki rank. So there was no doubt in my mind."

Gōeidō's danpatsu-shiki, or retirement ceremony, was planned to be held at the end of January 2021 at the Ryōgoku Kokugikan following that month's sumo tournament, but it was postponed due to the COVID-19 pandemic. The ceremony was eventually held two years after his retirement on 29 January 2022. Shortly before his rescheduled retirement ceremony, it was announced that Gōeidō was approved to open his own stable, Takekuma stable.

In March 2024, it was announced that he would take on the role of ringside judge starting with the May tournament.

== Fighting style ==
Gōeidō was a yotsu-sumo wrestler, preferring grappling rather than pushing or thrusting techniques. His preferred grip on his opponent's mawashi was migi-yotsu, a left hand outside, right hand inside position. His most common winning kimarite was yorikiri, or force out, but he used a wide variety of techniques in his career, including sotogake, an outer leg trip, and kubinage, the neck throw.

== Personal life ==
Gōeidō's marriage was announced through the Sumo Association in December 2020. The marriage was registered in May and the couple's first son was born in November.

== Career record ==
Gōeidō Gōtarō
Year	January Hatsu basho, Tokyo	March Haru basho, Osaka	May Natsu basho, Tokyo	July Nagoya basho, Nagoya	September Aki basho, Tokyo	November Kyūshū basho, Fukuoka
2005	(Maezumo)	West Jonokuchi #31; 7–0; Champion	West Jonidan #25; 6–1	West Sandanme #61; 7–0; Champion	West Makushita #37; 4–3	West Makushita #32; 7–0; Champion
2006	West Makushita #2; 3–4	West Makushita #5; 3–4	West Makushita #9; 4–3	West Makushita #7; 4–3	West Makushita #6; 7–0; Champion	West Jūryō #11; 8–7
2007	West Jūryō #10; 8–7	West Jūryō #9; 11–4	East Jūryō #3; 6–9	West Jūryō #5; 12–3–P	West Maegashira #14; 11–4; F	West Maegashira #6; 8–7
2008	East Maegashira #3; 5–10	East Maegashira #8; 8–7	West Maegashira #7; 8–7	West Maegashira #4; 7–8	West Maegashira #5; 10–5; F	East Komusubi #1; 5–10
2009	West Maegashira #3; 10–5; T	East Komusubi #1; 9–6	West Sekiwake #1; 6–9	West Maegashira #1; 5–10	West Maegashira #5; 10–5	West Komusubi #1; 7–8
2010	East Maegashira #2; 7–8 ★	East Maegashira #3; 2–4–9	West Maegashira #9; 9–6	East Maegashira #4; Suspended; 0–0–15	East Jūryō #1; 12–3	East Maegashira #14; 12–3
2011	East Maegashira #5; 11–4	East Maegashira #1; Tournament Cancelled; Match fixing investigation 0–0–0	East Maegashira #1; 11–4; T	East Komusubi #1; 5–10	West Maegashira #5; 10–5	West Maegashira #1; 7–8
2012	West Maegashira #2; 6–9	West Maegashira #6; 12–3; F	West Sekiwake #1; 8–7; O	East Sekiwake #1; 7–7–1	East Sekiwake #1; 8–7	West Sekiwake #1; 11–4; T
2013	East Sekiwake #1; 8–7	East Sekiwake #1; 10–5	East Sekiwake #1; 7–8	West Sekiwake #1; 8–7	West Sekiwake #1; 11–4; O	East Sekiwake #1; 8–7
2014	East Sekiwake #1; 8–7	East Sekiwake #1; 12–3; O	East Sekiwake #1; 8–7; O	East Sekiwake #1; 12–3; O	West Ōzeki #2; 8–7	West Ōzeki #2; 5–10
2015	West Ōzeki #2; 8–7	West Ōzeki #2; 8–7	West Ōzeki #2; 8–6–1	West Ōzeki #1; 9–6	East Ōzeki #2; 7–8	West Ōzeki #2; 8–7
2016	West Ōzeki #2; 4–11	East Ōzeki #2; 12–3	West Ōzeki #1; 9–6	East Ōzeki #2; 7–8	East Ōzeki #2; 15–0	East Ōzeki #1; 9–6
2017	West Ōzeki #1; 8–5–2	East Ōzeki #1; 1–5–9	West Ōzeki #1; 9–6	West Ōzeki #1; 7–8	West Ōzeki #1; 11–4–P	East Ōzeki #1; 9–6
2018	East Ōzeki #1; 8–7	West Ōzeki #1; 9–6	West Ōzeki #1; 3–6–6	East Ōzeki #1; 10–5	East Ōzeki #1; 12–3	East Ōzeki #1; 8–4–3
2019	West Ōzeki #1; 9–6	West Ōzeki #1; 12–3	East Ōzeki #1; 9–6	East Ōzeki #1; 3–5–7	West Ōzeki #1; 10–5	East Ōzeki #1; 0–2–13
2020	West Ōzeki #1; Retired; 5–10	x	x	x	x	x
Record given as wins–losses–absences Top division champion Top division runner-up Retired Lower divisions Non-participation Sanshō key: F=Fighting spirit; O=Outstanding performance; T=Technique Also shown: ★=Kinboshi; P=Playoff(s); Divisions: Makuuchi — Jūryō — Makushita — Sandanme — Jonidan — Jonokuchi Makuuchi ranks: Yokozuna — Ōzeki — Sekiwake — Komusubi — Maegashira

== See also ==
- List of sumo tournament top division champions
- List of sumo tournament top division runners-up
- List of sumo record holders
- Glossary of sumo terms
- List of past sumo wrestlers
- List of ōzeki
