= Iwakiyama Ryūta =

Japanese sumo wrestler (born 1976)

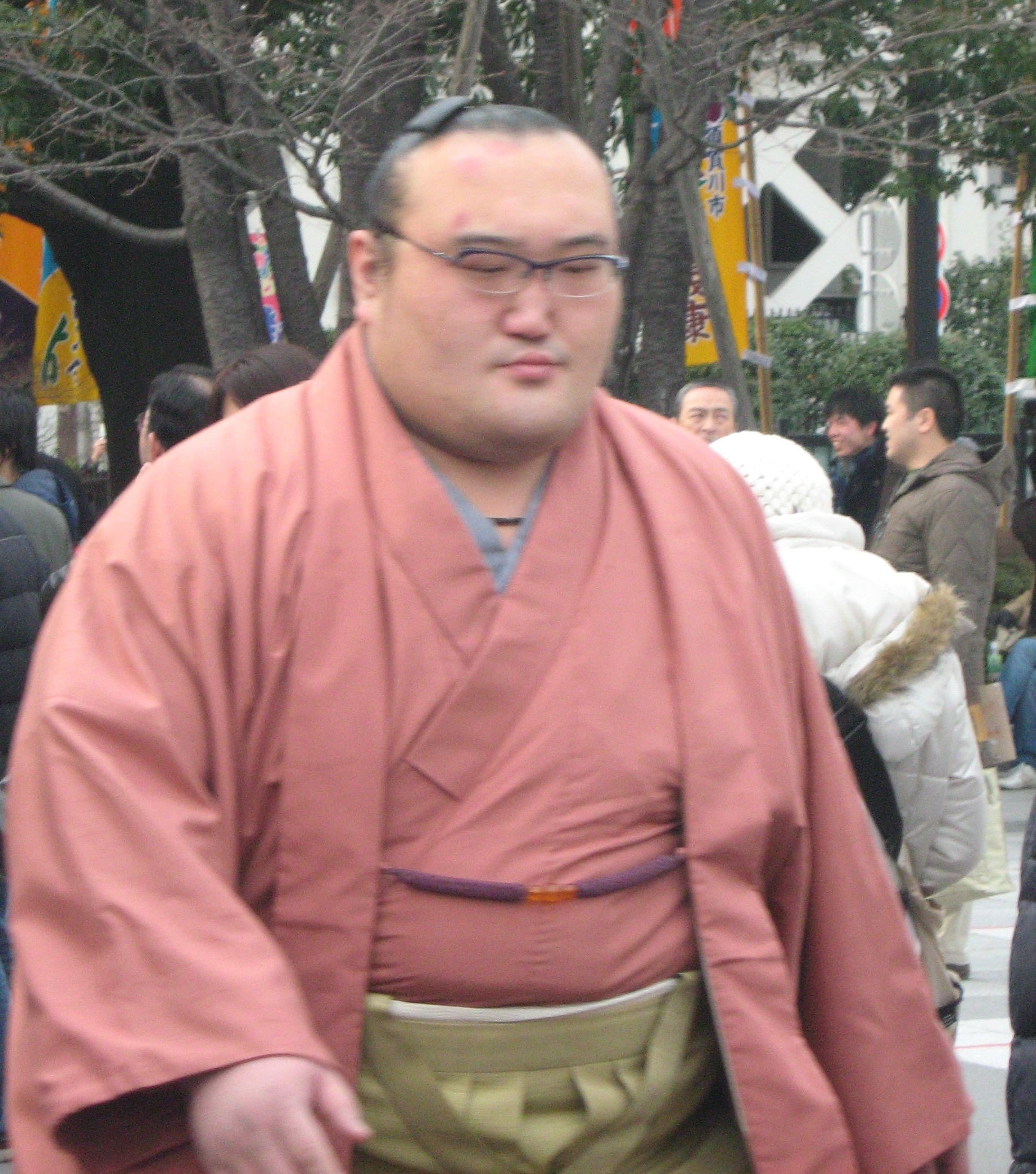

Personal information
- Native name: 岩木山 竜太
- Born: Ryūta Tsushima; March 2, 1976 (age 50) Aomori, Japan
- Height: 1.84 m (6 ft 1/2 in)
- Weight: 174 kg (384 lb)

Sport
- Sport: Sumo
- University team: Aomori University
- Retired: September, 2010
- Heya: Nakadachi → Sakaigawa
- Record: 407-365-78
- Debut: July, 2000
- Highest rank: Komusubi (November, 2003)
- Elder name: Sekinoto
- Championships: 2 (Jūryō); 1 (Sandanme)
- Special Prizes: Fighting Spirit (1); Technique (1)
- Gold Stars: 1 (Asashōryū)
- Updated on September 2010

Iwakiyama Ryūta (born March 2, 1976, as Ryūta Tsushima in Aomori Prefecture, Japan), is a former sumo wrestler. A former amateur sumo champion, he turned professional in 2000 and reached the top division at the end of 2002. The highest rank he reached was komusubi. He was a runner-up in one tournament and earned two special prizes in his career. After his retirement in 2010 he became an elder of the Japan Sumo Association under the name Sekinoto.

== Early life and sumo background ==
He was born in Hirosaki, Nakatsugaru District. After a successful start in amateur sumo at Aomori University, Tsushima worked as a member of staff at Aomori Yamada High School after graduating, not joining the professional sport until the age of 24 in July 2000. He was recruited by ex-komusubi Ryōgoku, a former amateur champion himself, and joined his Sakaigawa stable (then known as Nakadachi stable). His shikona or fighting name came from Mount Iwaki, which is near his home town.

== Career ==
Iwakiyama had makushita tsukedashi (promising amateur) status and so began in makushita (the third division), but an injury in his second tournament saw him demoted to sandanme. (His stablemaster had had a similar experience in his active days, also dropping to sandanme after beginning in makushita.) He recovered by winning the sandanme championship in March 2001 and by March 2002 was promoted to jūryō. He reached the top makuuchi division in November 2002. A long-standing lower back problem forced him to withdraw from the March 2003 tournament but in September of that year he produced an 11-4 record, his best score in the top division to date, which earned him promotion to the titled san'yaku ranks for the first time in November 2003. He was also the first member of his stable to reach a san'yaku rank since it opened in 1998.

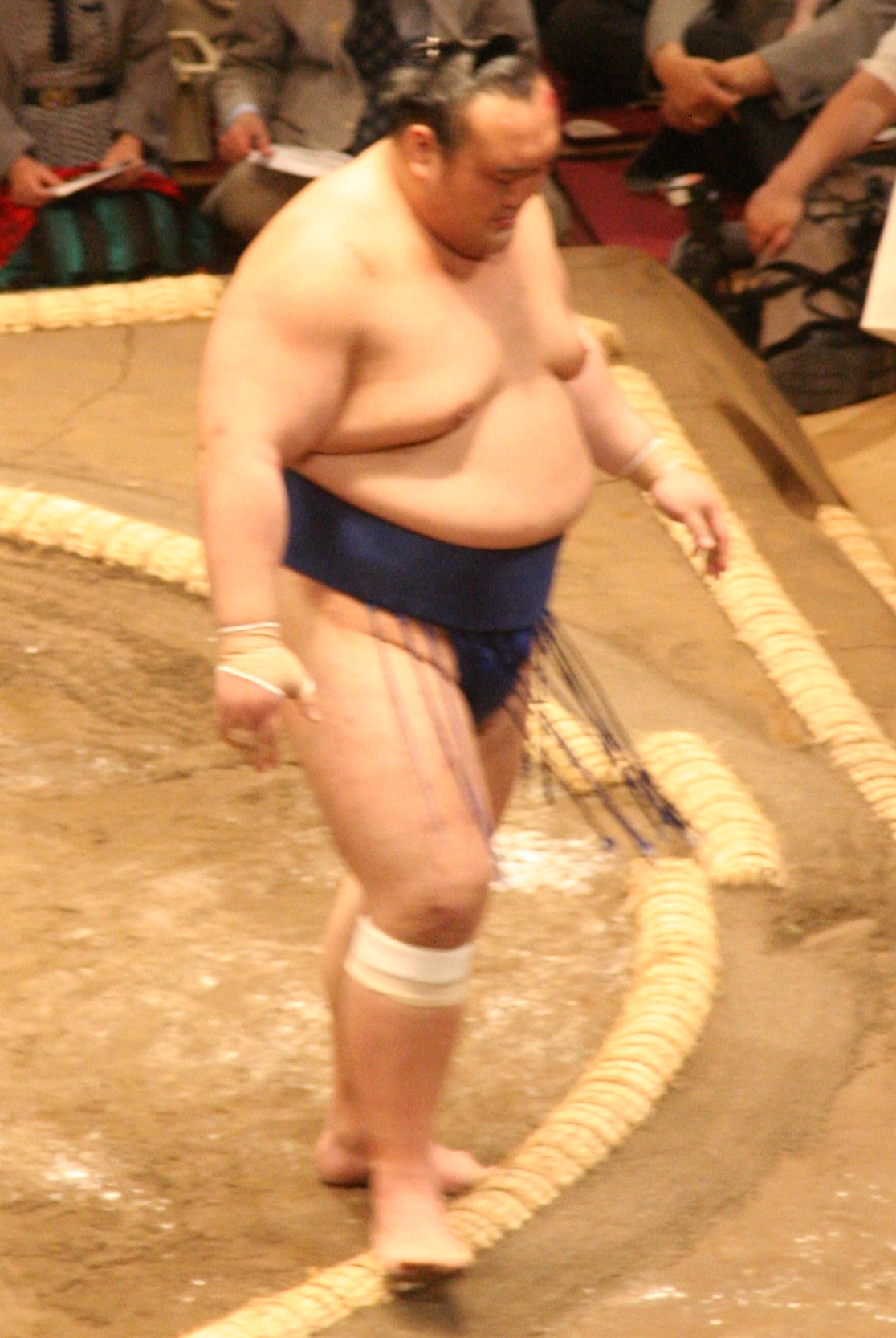
Iwakiyama in May 2009

Iwakiyama was twice ranked as komusubi on the banzuke and had one yokozuna upset and two special prizes to his credit but because of poor results he was demoted to jūryō for the 2007 Nagoya basho. However he won the jūryō yūshō for this tournament so he fought again in the highest division in September 2007. He could only manage a 4–11 record and slipped to the jūryō 1 ranking for November, but he produced a strong 11-4 record to earn immediate promotion back to the top division. On this occasion he produced a comfortable 9-6 score. After struggling to a 2-7 start in March 2008, he won five out of his last six matches to preserve his top division status once again. He withdrew from the third day of the September 2008 tournament after suffering an ankle injury, and fell to jūryō. Upon his return in November he had little difficulty in earning promotion back to makuuchi, scoring 11 wins at jūryō 2.

Following three consecutive kachi-koshi scores in the first three tournaments of 2009 he was promoted to maegashira 3 in July, his highest rank for nearly three years. He faced all the top ranked wrestlers, and his 5-10 score included a victory over ōzeki Chiyotaikai.

He was forced to sit out the May 2010 tournament on medical advice after suffering a cerebral infarction. He stated that he would seek treatment and hoped to return to active competition, but he was also unable to take part in the July 2010 basho in which he was ranked in the jūryō division. His stablemaster indicated that he did not want his wrestler to fight in the makushita division, but in fact Iwakiyama escaped relegation to makushita, instead being ranked at the very bottom of jūryō.

== Retirement ==
After missing the September tournament, Iwakiyama tearfully announced his retirement from competition on September 26, 2010. His illness had caused him to lose so much weight that he would need at least six months to be back to full weight and fitness. Rather than risk long term health issues from training for a return, he retired on his wife's advice. He will stay in sumo as a coach under the toshiyori name Sekinoto. His danpatsu-shiki, or official retirement ceremony, was originally scheduled for May 2011 but was postponed due to the sumo match-fixing scandal. It eventually took place in January 2012.

== Fighting style ==
Iwakiyama was one of the heaviest men in the top division and so preferred straightforward force-out techniques, using his bulk to his best advantage. Roughly half of all his wins were by either yori-kiri (force out) or oshi-dashi (push out). His favourite grip on his opponent's mawashi was hidari-yotsu, with his right hand outside and left hand inside his opponent's arms. He never resorted to henka (sidestepping) at the tachi-ai or initial charge.

== Family ==
Iwakiyama announced his engagement in December 2007 and was married in April 2008. Former yokozuna Wajima was among the guests.

== Career record ==
Iwakiyama Ryūta
Year	January Hatsu basho, Tokyo	March Haru basho, Osaka	May Natsu basho, Tokyo	July Nagoya basho, Nagoya	September Aki basho, Tokyo	November Kyūshū basho, Fukuoka
2000	x	x	x	Makushita tsukedashi #60; 4–3	East Makushita #51; 0–2–5	East Sandanme #26; 5–0–2
2001	East Sandanme #2; Sat out due to injury 0–0–7	East Sandanme #62; 7–0–P; Champion	East Makushita #38; 6–1	West Makushita #16; 3–4	East Makushita #26; 6–1	East Makushita #10; 5–2
2002	East Makushita #3; 6–1	East Jūryō #11; 8–7	East Jūryō #9; 11–4–P; Champion	West Jūryō #3; 9–6	East Jūryō #1; 10–5	West Maegashira #11; 10–5; F
2003	West Maegashira #5; 7–8	East Maegashira #6; 6–5–4	West Maegashira #9; 7–8	East Maegashira #10; 8–7	East Maegashira #5; 11–4; T	West Komusubi #1; 6–9
2004	East Maegashira #2; 6–9	West Maegashira #5; 7–8	West Maegashira #6; 10–5	West Maegashira #1; 7–8	East Maegashira #2; 7–8 ★	East Maegashira #3; 9–6
2005	East Maegashira #1; 8–7	East Komusubi #1; 4–11	West Maegashira #4; 5–10	West Maegashira #8; 9–3–3	East Maegashira #4; 7–8	West Maegashira #4; 7–8
2006	East Maegashira #5; 8–7	West Maegashira #3; 4–11	East Maegashira #9; 7–8	West Maegashira #10; 9–6	West Maegashira #5; 10–5	West Maegashira #1; 2–13
2007	East Maegashira #10; 7–8	East Maegashira #11; 5–10	West Maegashira #15; 6–9	East Jūryō #1; 12–3–PP; Champion	East Maegashira #10; 4–11	East Jūryō #1; 11–4
2008	East Maegashira #13; 9–6	East Maegashira #9; 7–8	East Maegashira #11; 8–7	West Maegashira #9; 8–7	East Maegashira #7; 1–2–12	East Jūryō #2; 11–4
2009	East Maegashira #11; 8–7	East Maegashira #10; 8–7	East Maegashira #8; 9–6	West Maegashira #3; 5–10	East Maegashira #8; 8–7	West Maegashira #4; 2–13
2010	East Maegashira #14; 9–6	East Maegashira #8; 8–7	East Maegashira #5; Sat out due to injury 0–0–15	East Jūryō #2; Sat out due to injury 0–0–15	West Jūryō #14; Retired; 0–0–15	x
Record given as wins–losses–absences Top division champion Top division runner-up Retired Lower divisions Non-participation Sanshō key: F=Fighting spirit; O=Outstanding performance; T=Technique Also shown: ★=Kinboshi; P=Playoff(s); Divisions: Makuuchi — Jūryō — Makushita — Sandanme — Jonidan — Jonokuchi Makuuchi ranks: Yokozuna — Ōzeki — Sekiwake — Komusubi — Maegashira

== See also ==
- List of sumo tournament top division runners-up
- List of sumo tournament second division champions
- Glossary of sumo terms
- List of past sumo wrestlers
- List of sumo elders
- List of komusubi
