= Sadanoumi Takashi =

Japanese sumo wrestler

Sadanoumi Takashi 佐田の海 貴士
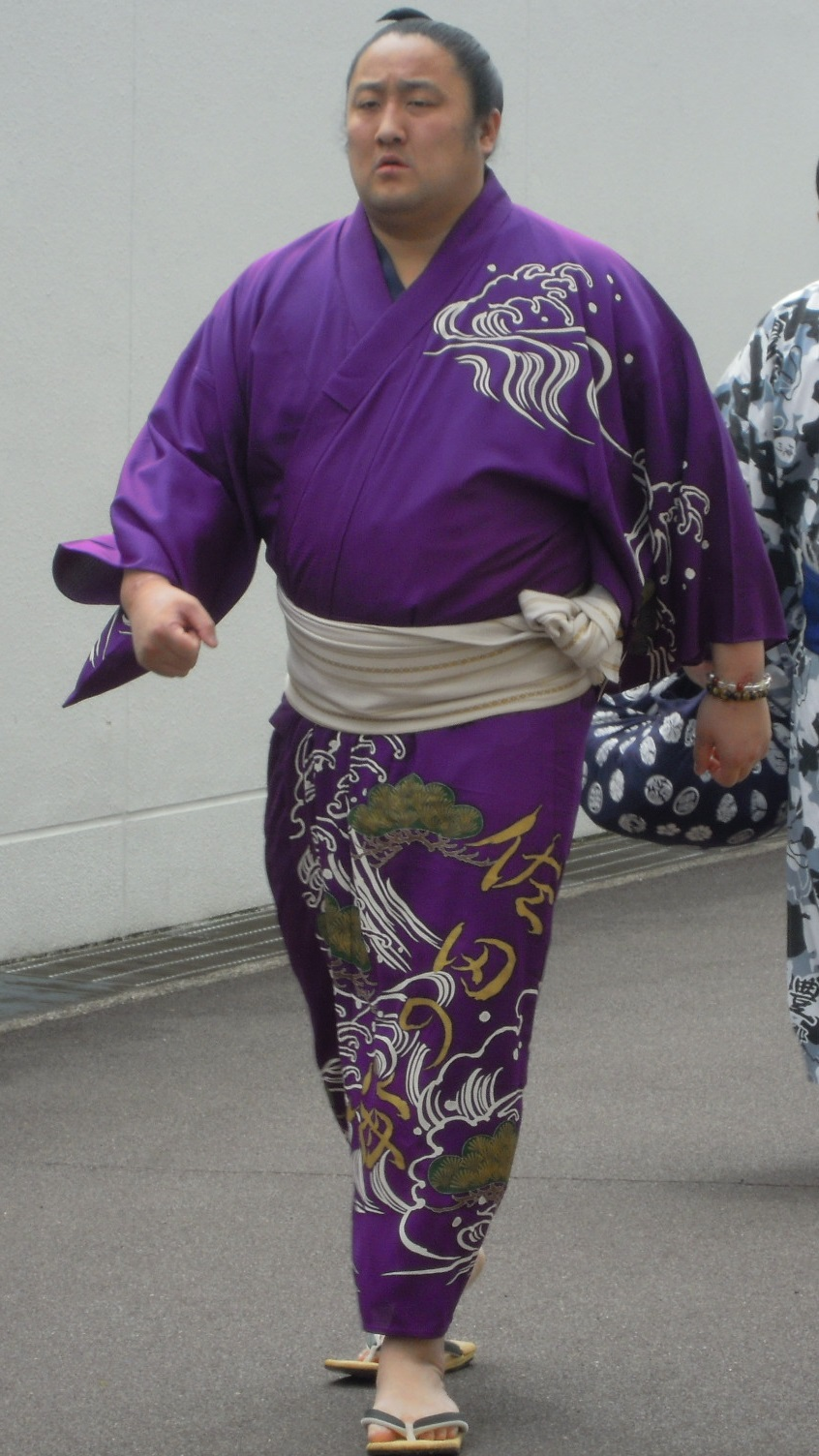
- Sadanoumi in 2014

Personal information
- Born: Kaname Matsumura; May 11, 1987 (age 39) Kumamoto, Kumamoto Prefecture; Japan
- Height: 1.82 m (5 ft 11 1/2 in)
- Weight: 141 kg (311 lb; 22.2 st)

Sport
- Sport: Sumo
- Rank: see below
- Heya: Sakaigawa
- Debut: March, 2003
- Highest rank: Maegashira 1 (July, 2015)
- Championships: 1 (Jūryō); 1 (Makushita); 1 (Sandanme)
- Special Prizes: Fighting Spirit (3)
- Gold Stars: 1 (Harumafuji)
- Updated on 25 May 2025

Sadanoumi Takashi (Japanese: 佐田の海 貴士; born May 11, 1987 as Kaname Matsumura (松村 要, Matsumura Kaname)) is a Japanese professional sumo wrestler from Kumamoto. He made his debut in 2003, and reached the top makuuchi division eleven years later in 2014. His highest rank has been maegashira 1. He has been a runner-up in one tournament, and has won three special prizes for Fighting Spirit and one gold star for defeating a yokozuna. Sadanoumi has fought in the most tournaments among current sekitori-ranked wrestlers . He wrestles for Sakaigawa stable.

== Early life and sumo background ==
Matsumura was born the oldest son of Sadanoumi Kōji, a sumo wrestler active in the 1980s who reached the rank of komusubi. Although he has no memories of his father as a wrestler, since the latter retired when Matsumura was 1 year old, he aspired to follow in his father's footsteps since he was three years old. Matsumura is nevertheless familiar with the sumo world since his father, under the name of Tagonoura, was a coach at Dewanoumi stable and his family regularly attended the senshūraku's after parties. On the advice of his father, he began to discover other sports such as football but upon graduation from junior high school in 2003 he joined Sakaigawa stable on his father's advice, that particular stable being founded by former komusubi Ryōgoku who had himself been a protege of the senior Sadanoumi.

== Career ==
From the January 2004 tournament, he took the shikona surname of his father. Being a lighter wrestler, he struggled to succeed for a number of years, but in November 2007 he managed to take the sandanme division championship with a perfect 7–0 record. This championship catapulted him from sandanme 44 into the third division at the rank of makushita 27. Despite this achievement he would struggle in makushita for 3 more years until January 2010 when he took his second championship with another 7–0 record. This would put him in upper makushita where after two tournaments he was promoted to the salaried ranks of jūryō for the first time, along Kaisei, in July 2010. This was the first time in 14 years that the son of a former sekitori was promoted to sekitori himself; the last time being the father and son Tochiazuma Tomoyori and Tochiazuma Daisuke. Sadanoumi's promotion is also the ninth time in sumo history that a father and son have both attained the rank of sekitori. Sadanoumi lasted eight tournaments in the division before being demoted again, sitting out his last tournament in jūryō with a dislocated ankle. As before he began to struggle again in makushita and would remain there for twelve tournaments before working his way back up and finally re-entering jūryō in January 2014. This time around he found his stride quickly and was able to rise through jūryō in only two tournaments with two strong performances. He was promoted to the top division makuuchi in May 2014. He earned a 10–5 record and the Fighting Spirit prize. Sumo historians noted that Sadanoumi had repeated his father's same impressive achievement of earning the Fighting Spirit prize in his makuuchi debut 34 years earlier in 1980.

For a few tournaments after his makuuchi debut, when he appeared in the ring entering ceremony, Sadanoumi wore a keshō-mawashi with the official Kumamoto prefectural mascot Kumamon on it to promote his home prefecture. Sadanoumi wore the keshō-mawashi again at the May 2016 tournament to show his support for the disaster victims of the 2016 Kumamoto earthquakes.

Sadanoumi has a chronic disease of the cornea which severely limits his vision. In order to avoid risky surgery he wears special hard contacts every night that dramatically improve his vision for the following day.

He first fought all the top wrestlers ranked at maegashira 2 in the March 2015 tournament and posted a respectable 7–8 score that kept him ranked high enough to face all the top competition in the following tournament, where he scored his first kinboshi for defeating yokozuna Harumafuji and posted a winning record of 8–7, also beating the eventual tournament champion, Terunofuji. He was nominated for the Outstanding Performance Prize, normally given to those who beat the tournament champion or a yokozuna and manage a winning record, but there was opposition since he posted a bare minimum winning record with one win by default and the prize was not awarded. Nonetheless he was promoted to his highest rank to date of maegashira 1 for the July 2015 tournament. Since then his results have been disappointing and he slid down the maegashira ranks with seven consecutive make-koshi or losing scores from July 2015 to July 2016. He was able to get a winning record in September 2016 with an 8–7, however he got another losing record in the November 2016 tournament, scoring only 3–12 which was his worst record to date in the top division. He was demoted to the jūryō division after the March 2017 tournament, breaking a run of 18 straight tournaments at a maegashira rank, the longest amongst active wrestlers. However, a 9–6 record at the rank of jūryō 1 East was enough for an immediate return to the top division. He missed the first five days of the September 2017 tournament because of an injury to his right leg, and although he entered from Day 6, he could not prevent demotion to jūryō. In March 2018 he won the jūryō division championship with an 11–4 record, beating Akiseyama in a playoff, to ensure his return to makuuchi. Upon reaching his thirties, Sadanoumi began to consult doctors and specialists to condition his body to fight as long as possible, he himself wanting to fight until 40 years old. Despite never rising higher than maegashira 8 he remained in the top division until January 2021. After four tournaments in jūryō he returned to makuuchi in November 2021. In May 2022 he scored eleven wins against four losses to share runner-up honours alongside Takanoshō and Daieishō, and received his second Fighting Spirit Prize and first since 2014. In November 2022, Sadanoumi won his match against Ōzeki Shōdai. This match was the first time in three years that the two Kumamoto natives faced each other.

In October 2023, Sadanoumi was the active sekitori-ranked wrestler with the most tournaments to his name, with 122 since his professional debut in 2003. On this subject he regularly jokes with Tamawashi, who has tallied 117 tournaments since his debut in 2004 and is the oldest active sekitori (at 41); the two debating who is the other's senior. In the May 2024 tournament, Sadanoumi scored the seven-hundredth victory of his career against former ōzeki Shōdai, making him the third active wrestler with the most victories to his name.

After conceding eleven defeats in November 2024, Sadanoumi lost his status as a makuuchi wrestler when the banzuke for the first tournament of 2025 was published. Having regained his status at the following tournament, Sadanoumi went on a winning-record at the May tournament of the same year, taking a two-digit victory score for the first time in three years. Still the second oldest wrestler in the division, he also recorded the 1,500th match and 400th victory of his career. Sadanoumi was congratulated by the former Wakanohana, then a sports commentator, who praised his mobility as "better than that of the younger generation". On the final day of the tournament, it was announced that Sadanoumi would be the recipient of an unconditional third Fighting Spirit prize.

On the fifth day of the September 2026 tournament, Sadanoumi set a record for the most career matches when he faced Kazekenō. Although he lost the match, this 1,613th appearance placed Sadanoumi among the top 10 wrestlers with the most match appearances, tied with former sekiwake Fujizakura.

== Fighting style ==
Sadanoumi is a yotsu-zumō wrestler who prefers grappling techniques to pushing or thrusting. His favored grip on his opponent's mawashi or belt is migi-yotsu, a left hand outside, right hand inside position. His most common winning kimarite is yori-kiri, a straightforward force out, which accounts for around 40 per cent of his victories. He is also fond of uwate-nage (overarm throw). In his twentieth professional year, Sadanoumi began taking Jujutsu lessons and trained with karatekakas. A martial influence he attributes to the period of confinement associated with COVID that forced him to rethink his style.

== Personal life ==
Sadanoumi was married in June 2017 to a nurse who lives nearby his heya, after a five-year relationship. Around 600 guests attended their wedding ceremony. The couple has three children, two girls and a boy. He is also a big baseball fan and a supporter since his early elementary school days of the Tokyo Yakult Swallows.

== Career record ==
Sadanoumi Takashi
Year	January Hatsu basho, Tokyo	March Haru basho, Osaka	May Natsu basho, Tokyo	July Nagoya basho, Nagoya	September Aki basho, Tokyo	November Kyūshū basho, Fukuoka
2003	x	(Maezumō)	West Jonokuchi #27; 3–4	West Jonokuchi #12; 4–3	East Jonidan #100; 2–5	West Jonokuchi #10; 5–2
2004	East Jonidan #67; 2–5	West Jonidan #91; 3–4	East Jonidan #109; 5–2	East Jonidan #65; 4–3	East Jonidan #42; 3–4	West Jonidan #61; 4–3
2005	West Jonidan #36; 6–1	West Sandanme #70; 4–3	West Sandanme #53; 1–6	East Sandanme #84; 5–2	West Sandanme #52; 3–4	West Sandanme #69; 2–5
2006	East Sandanme #96; 5–2	East Sandanme #63; 3–4	East Sandanme #78; 5–2	East Sandanme #44; 5–2	East Sandanme #16; 3–4	West Sandanme #30; 3–4
2007	East Sandanme #46; 5–2	East Sandanme #20; 4–3	West Sandanme #7; 1–6	East Sandanme #39; 2–5	West Sandanme #64; 4–3	East Sandanme #44; 7–0; Champion
2008	East Makushita #27; 4–3	East Makushita #20; 2–5	East Makushita #34; 5–2	East Makushita #24; 4–3	East Makushita #20; 1–6	West Makushita #44; 5–2
2009	West Makushita #29; 3–4	East Makushita #38; 4–3	East Makushita #31; 4–3	West Makushita #25; 3–4	West Makushita #32; 3–4	West Makushita #40; 5–2
2010	East Makushita #29; 7–0; Champion	West Makushita #2; 3–4	East Makushita #5; 5–2	West Jūryō #14; 9–6	West Jūryō #5; 6–9	West Jūryō #9; 8–7
2011	East Jūryō #7; 7–8	East Jūryō #8; Tournament Cancelled; Match fixing investigation 0–0–0	East Jūryō #8; 5–10	East Jūryō #6; 7–8	East Jūryō #8; 7–8	West Jūryō #9; Sat out due to injury 0–0–15
2012	East Makushita #8; 1–6	West Makushita #23; 5–2	East Makushita #15; 2–5	East Makushita #25; 5–2	East Makushita #17; 5–2	East Makushita #6; 4–3
2013	West Makushita #1; 3–4	West Makushita #4; 2–3–2	East Makushita #12; 3–4	West Makushita #19; 4–3	West Makushita #15; 6–1	East Makushita #5; 4–3
2014	West Jūryō #13; 11–4	West Jūryō #4; 8–7	East Maegashira #17; 10–5; F	East Maegashira #11; 6–9	East Maegashira #12; 8–7	West Maegashira #7; 7–8
2015	West Maegashira #8; 9–6	East Maegashira #2; 7–8	East Maegashira #3; 8–7 ★	West Maegashira #1; 6–9	East Maegashira #3; 6–9	West Maegashira #5; 5–10
2016	East Maegashira #9; 7–8	West Maegashira #9; 7–8	East Maegashira #10; 7–8	West Maegashira #10; 7–8	West Maegashira #10; 8–7	West Maegashira #8; 3–12
2017	West Maegashira #15; 8–7	East Maegashira #12; 4–11	East Jūryō #1; 9–6	East Maegashira #14; 8–7	West Maegashira #12; 2–8–5	East Jūryō #5; 6–9
2018	East Jūryō #7; 9–6	East Jūryō #4; 11–4–P; Champion	East Maegashira #14; 8–7	East Maegashira #12; 8–7	East Maegashira #11; 8–7	East Maegashira #10; 7–8
2019	East Maegashira #11; 9–6	East Maegashira #9; 5–10	West Maegashira #13; 7–8	West Maegashira #13; 9–6	East Maegashira #10; 8–7	West Maegashira #8; 7–8
2020	East Maegashira #10; 7–8	East Maegashira #10; 6–9	East Maegashira #12; Tournament Cancelled; State of Emergency; 0–0–0	East Maegashira #12; 8–7	East Maegashira #10; 7–8	East Maegashira #11; 5–10
2021	East Maegashira #17; 5–10	West Jūryō #4; 6–9	West Jūryō #6; 6–9	West Jūryō #8; 9–6	West Jūryō #3; 10–5	West Maegashira #16; 9–6
2022	East Maegashira #11; 8–7	West Maegashira #8; 5–10	West Maegashira #12; 11–4; F	West Maegashira #5; 7–8	West Maegashira #5; 9–6	West Maegashira #4; 8–7
2023	West Maegashira #4; 6–9	West Maegashira #6; 6–9	East Maegashira #8; 7–8	East Maegashira #8; 5–10	West Maegashira #12; 8–7	East Maegashira #11; 8–7
2024	West Maegashira #10; 6–9	West Maegashira #11; 8–7	East Maegashira #11; 9–6	West Maegashira #7; 5–10	East Maegashira #11; 7–8	West Maegashira #12; 4–11
2025	East Jūryō #1; 9–6	West Maegashira #15; 8–7	West Maegashira #13; 10–5; F	East Maegashira #8; 4–11	East Maegashira #14; 6–9	West Maegashira #16; 4–11
2026	East Jūryō #4; 9–6	West Jūryō #1; 7–8	East Jūryō #2; 7–8	West Jūryō #2; 5–10	East Jūryō #5; 3–12	West Jūryō #11; 5–10
Record given as wins–losses–absences Top division champion Top division runner-up Retired Non-participation Jūryō Lower divisions Sanshō key: F=Fighting spirit; O=Outstanding performance; T=Technique Also shown: ★=Kinboshi; P=Playoff(s); Divisions: Makuuchi — Jūryō — Makushita — Sandanme — Jonidan — Jonokuchi Makuuchi ranks: Yokozuna — Ōzeki — Sekiwake — Komusubi — Maegashira

== See also ==
- Glossary of sumo terms
- List of active sumo wrestlers
- List of active gold star earners
- List of active special prize winners
- List of sumo record holders
- List of sumo top division runners-up
- List of sumo second division champions
