= Asahishō Kōta =

Japanese sumo wrestler

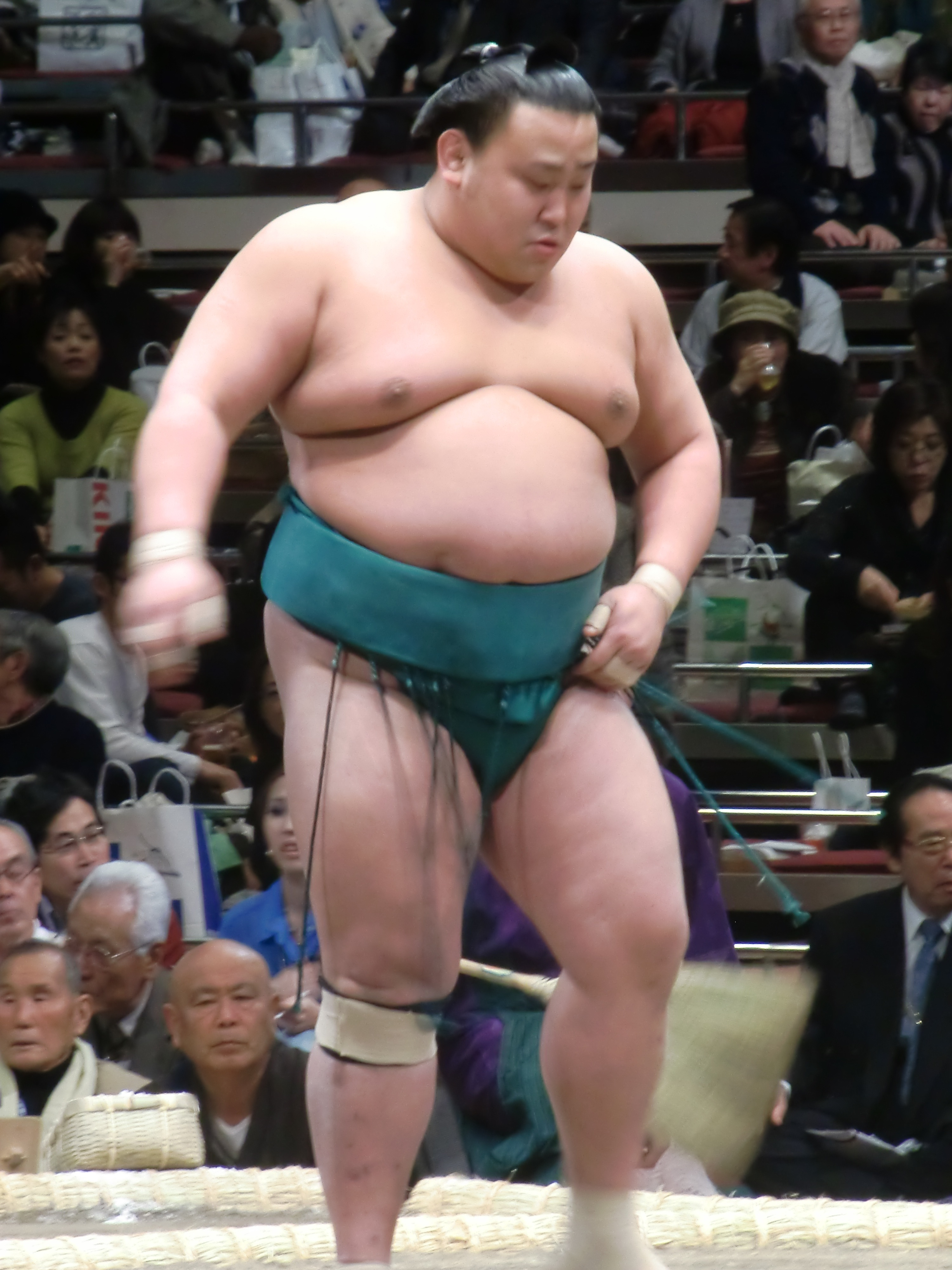
- Asahishō in his second sekitori tournament in January 2012

Personal information
- Native name: 旭日松 広太
- Born: Kōta Matsushima; July 21, 1989 (age 37)
- Height: 175 cm (5 ft 9 in)
- Weight: 140 kg (310 lb)

Sport
- Sport: Sumo
- Retired: June 2021
- Heya: Ōshima → Tomozuna
- Record: 453-453-31
- Debut: March 2005
- Highest rank: Maegashira 11 (November 2012)
- Elder name: Furiwake
- Championships: 1 (Makushita)
- Updated on June 21, 2021

Asahishō Kōta (Japanese: 旭日松 広太; born July 21, 1989 as Kōta Matsushima (松嶋 広太)) is a retired Japanese professional sumo wrestler from Noda, Chiba. He made his professional debut in March 2005, reaching the top makuuchi division in September 2012. He has fought in the top division in four tournaments and his highest rank has been maegashira 11. Originally from Ōshima stable, he most recently wrestled for Tomozuna stable. He was demoted from the jūryō division to the makushita division in 2017.

== Career ==
He began sumo at the age of just three and won national championships for five consecutive years from the second to sixth years of elementary school. He joined professional sumo upon graduation from junior high school, recruited by Ōshima stable. At just 170 cm (5 ft 7 in) tall he was accepted by passing the secondary exam for promising recruits who do not meet the primary height requirement. In his first few tournaments he fought under his own surname of Matsushima, but soon adopted the shikona of Asahishō. He won the makushita division championship or yūshō in September 2011 with a perfect 7–0 record and this performance saw him promoted to the elite sekitori ranks for the first time in the November 2011 tournament. He was the first sekitori from the city of Noda. In April 2012 his heya closed upon the retirement of his stablemaster, former ōzeki Asahikuni, and he moved to Tomozuna stable. In May 2012 he saw his longtime stablemate Kyokutenhō win the top division championship at 37 years of age, and was overcome with emotion while waiting to congratulate him afterwards.

In July 2012 he produced a 10–5 record at jūryō 4, and this earned him promotion to the top makuuchi division for the first time. He was the tenth wrestler who began at Ōshima stable to reach the top division. He came through with a winning record in his makuuchi debut, but two make-koshi or losing scores in his next two tournaments saw him demoted back to jūryō. In July 2013 he somewhat fortuitously won promotion back to the top division despite only scoring 9–6 at jūryō 7, due to a large number of vacancies with five men being demoted from makuuchi, and also many jūryō wrestlers around him under-performing. However, in September he injured his elbow in a match with Shotenro on Day 9 and had to withdraw. Although he returned to the tournament on Day 13 and won two more matches he could not prevent demotion back to jūryō. This was his final appearance in the top division.

In 2017 Asahishō narrowly failed to get a majority of wins against losses in three straight tournaments, and his third 7–8 in May 2017 cost him his place in jūryō, as only he and Takagenji had demotable records and Abi and Iwasaki were both deserving of promotion. During this tournament he was reprimanded on Day 2 by the ringside judge Minato Oyakata, the former Minatofuji, for giving Takagenji an extra shove after the match was already over. Asahishō apologized for the "educational slap" afterwards, explaining that he was annoyed at Takagenji (then just 20 and in his first jūryō tournament) for disrespecting his opponents by not bowing properly. He was demoted to makushita after 34 tournaments as a sekitori, and never managed a return to the paid ranks. He was forced to sit out the January 2021 tournament after a wrestler at Tomozuna stable tested positive for COVID-19. His final tournament in May 2021 saw him ranked in the sandanme division.

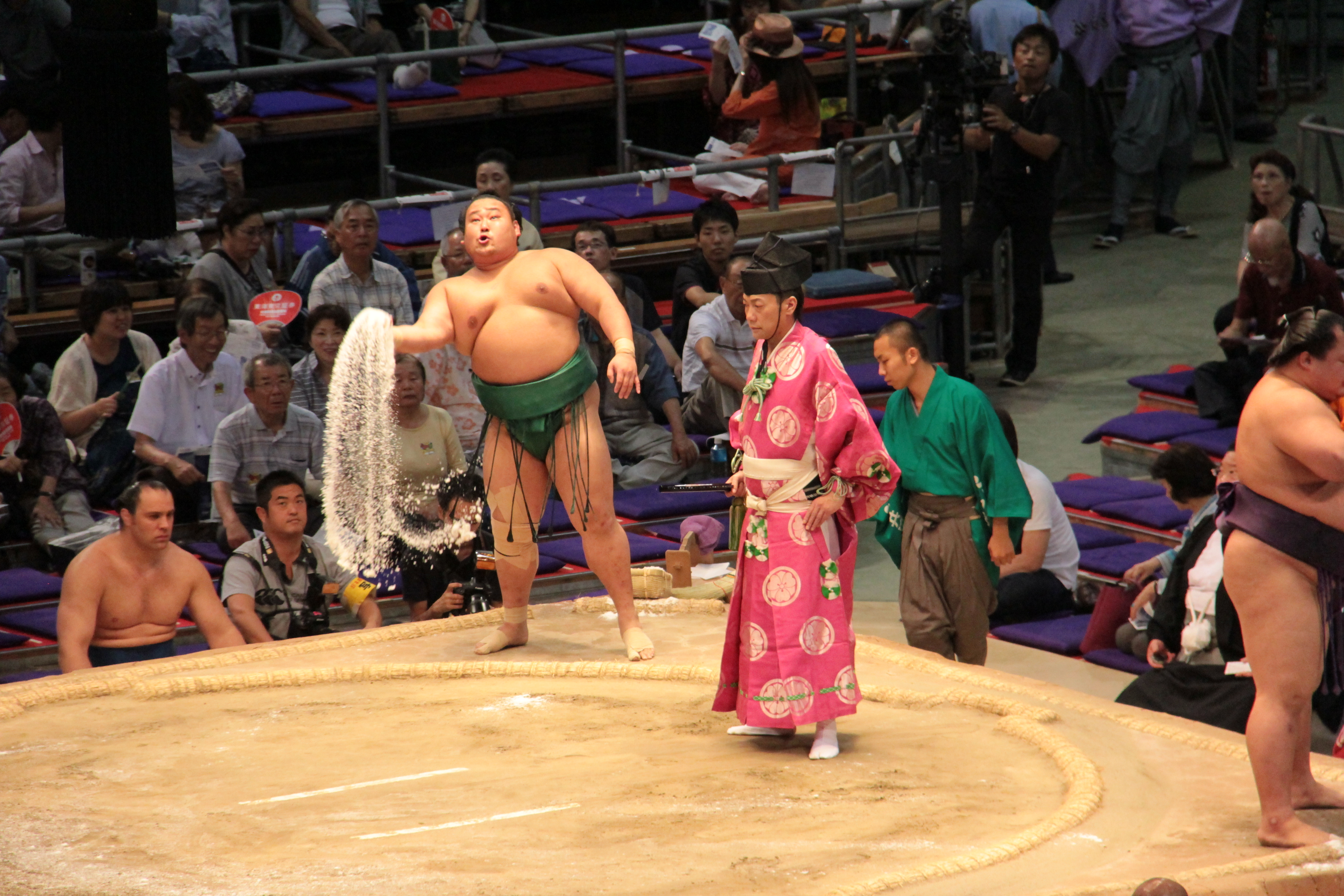
Salt-throwing routine from July 2014

Asahishō had a habit of throwing unusually large amounts of purifying salt into the ring before his bouts, previously the trademark of Mitoizumi and Kitazakura. He began doing it in May 2012 to change his luck after suffering ten straight defeats from Day 1, and he promptly won his next five matches. He told reporters in the following July 2012 tournament, "I want the fans to remember my name." He throws so much salt on the start lines that he occasionally causes his opponents to slip on the surface at the tachi-ai.

Asahishō is known for his sense of humour and love of practical jokes, which has made him a regular on the chat show circuit despite his relative lack of success in the top division. In December 2014 he appeared in a commercial with three other wrestlers as part of a heavy metal band, promoting Docomo's Moveband activity tracker.

== Retirement ==
Asahishō retired in June 2021, and took on the elder name of Kiriyama. His danpatsu-shiki (retirement ceremony) was held at the Ryōgoku Kokugikan on 3 December 2022. At the end of July 2024 he changed his elder name to Furiwake. He left the Sumo Association after the September 2024 tournament.

== Fighting style ==
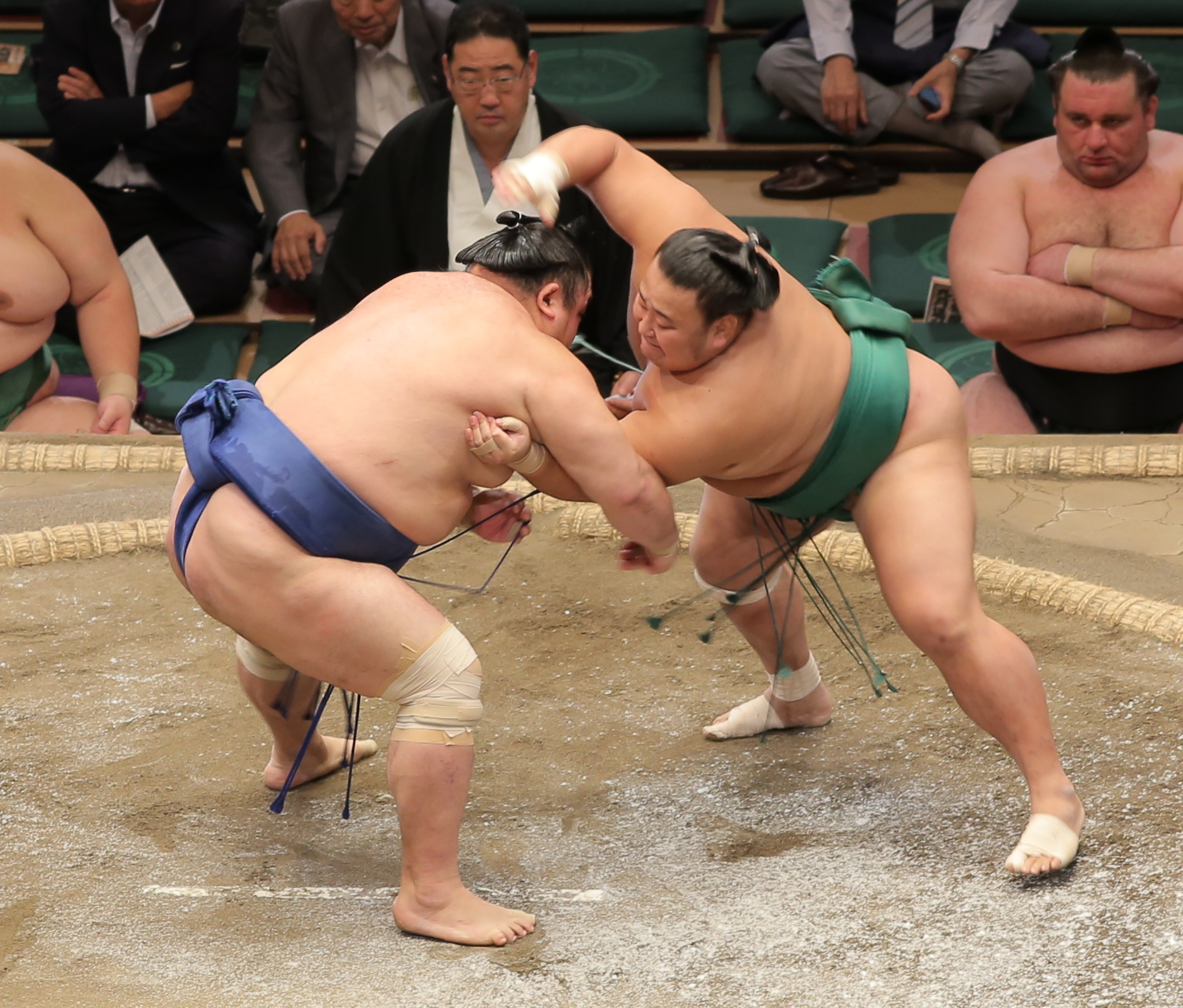
Asahishō (right) fighting Wakanosato on Day 8 of the September 2014 tournament

Asahishō was an oshi-sumo specialist who preferred pushing and thrusting techniques to grabbing the opponent's mawashi. His most common winning kimarite was oshi-dashi, or push out. He also regularly won by forcing his opponent to the floor of the dohyō by hiki-otoshi (pull down) or hataki-komi (slap down).

== Family ==
Asahishō married a woman from Tokyo in June 2014 and their first child, a son, was born in November 2014.

== Career record ==
Asahishō Kōta
| Year | January Hatsu basho, Tokyo | March Haru basho, Osaka | May Natsu basho, Tokyo | July Nagoya basho, Nagoya | September Aki basho, Tokyo | November Kyūshū basho, Fukuoka |
|---|---|---|---|---|---|---|
| 2005 | x | (Maezumo) | East Jonokuchi #26; 3–4 | West Jonokuchi #22; 5–2 | East Jonidan #101; 2–5 | West Jonokuchi #2; 6–1 |
| 2006 | West Jonidan #44; 1–6 | West Jonidan #86; 3–4 | West Jonidan #108; 6–1 | West Jonidan #28; 0–1–6 | West Jonidan #98; 3–4 | East Jonidan #115; 6–1 |
| 2007 | East Jonidan #34; 2–5 | West Jonidan #64; 4–3 | East Jonidan #37; 5–2 | East Sandanme #100; 5–2 | East Sandanme #67; 3–4 | East Sandanme #80; 6–1 |
| 2008 | West Sandanme #22; 3–4 | West Sandanme #33; 4–3 | East Sandanme #18; 5–2 | West Makushita #57; 0–1–6 | West Sandanme #32; 3–4 | West Sandanme #41; 5–2 |
| 2009 | West Sandanme #13; 4–3 | West Sandanme #3; 4–3 | West Makushita #55; 4–3 | East Makushita #45; 3–4 | West Makushita #56; 2–5 | East Sandanme #22; 4–3 |
| 2010 | East Sandanme #11; 3–4 | East Sandanme #23; 3–4 | East Sandanme #39; 6–1 | East Makushita #52; 5–2 | East Makushita #32; 3–4 | West Makushita #37; 5–2 |
| 2011 | West Makushita #24; 4–3 | Tournament Cancelled; 0–0–0 | East Makushita #21; 4–3 | West Makushita #10; 3–4 | West Makushita #12; 7–0; Champion | East Jūryō #13; 8–7 |
| 2012 | East Jūryō #10; 9–6 | East Jūryō #4; 9–6 | East Jūryō #1; 5–10 | West Jūryō #4; 10–5 | East Maegashira #14; 8–7 | East Maegashira #11; 6–9 |
| 2013 | West Maegashira #13; 4–11 | East Jūryō #3; 8–7 | West Jūryō #1; 4–11 | East Jūryō #7; 9–6 | East Maegashira #16; 5–8–2 | West Jūryō #4; 9–6 |
| 2014 | East Jūryō #1; 7–8 | East Jūryō #2; 7–8 | East Jūryō #3; 5–10 | East Jūryō #8; 6–9 | East Jūryō #11; 8–7 | East Jūryō #6; 8–7 |
| 2015 | East Jūryō #4; 9–6 | West Jūryō #2; 5–10 | East Jūryō #8; 9–6 | West Jūryō #3; 6–9 | East Jūryō #6; 6–9 | West Jūryō #8; 6–9 |
| 2016 | West Jūryō #10; 8–7 | East Jūryō #9; 7–8 | East Jūryō #10; 8–7 | West Jūryō #9; 5–10 | West Jūryō #12; 9–6 | West Jūryō #7; 6–9 |
| 2017 | East Jūryō #12; 7–8 | East Jūryō #13; 7–8 | West Jūryō #13; 7–8 | West Makushita #1; 2–2–3 | West Makushita #11; 5–2 | East Makushita #6; 2–5 |
| 2018 | West Makushita #15; 3–4 | East Makushita #22; 1–6 | West Makushita #46; 4–3 | East Makushita #38; 4–3 | East Makushita #29; 2–5 | East Makushita #45; 5–2 |
| 2019 | East Makushita #30; 4–3 | West Makushita #23; 4–3 | East Makushita #19; 2–5 | West Makushita #32; 3–4 | East Makushita #40; 2–5 | West Makushita #58; 3–4 |
| 2020 | West Sandanme #13; 6–1 | West Makushita #38; 4–3 | East Makushita #31; Tournament Cancelled; 0–0–0 | East Makushita #31; 2–5 | East Makushita #41; 4–3 | West Makushita #31; 3–4 |
| 2021 | West Makushita #42; Sat out due to COVID rules 0–0–7 | West Makushita #42; Sat out due to injury 0–0–7 | West Sandanme #22; 4–3 | West Sandanme #8; Retired – | x | x |
Record given as wins–losses–absences Top division champion Top division runner-up Retired Lower divisions Non-participation Sanshō key: F=Fighting spirit; O=Outstanding performance; T=Technique Also shown: ★=Kinboshi; P=Playoff(s); Divisions: Makuuchi — Jūryō — Makushita — Sandanme — Jonidan — Jonokuchi Makuuchi ranks: Yokozuna — Ōzeki — Sekiwake — Komusubi — Maegashira

== See also ==
- Glossary of sumo terms
- List of active sumo wrestlers
