= Kisenosato Yutaka =

Japanese sumo wrestler (born 1986)

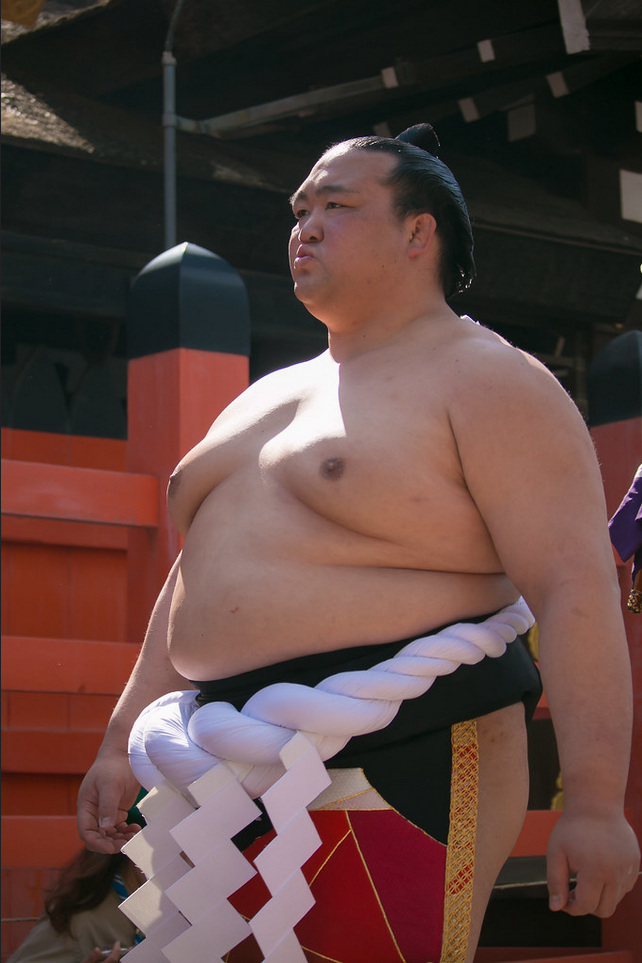
- Kisenosato, March 2017

Personal information
- Native name: 稀勢の里 寛
- Born: Yutaka Hagiwara; July 3, 1986 (age 40) Ashiya, Hyōgo, Japan
- Height: 188 cm (6 ft 2 in)
- Weight: 177 kg (390 lb; 27.9 st)
- Website: https://nishonosekibeya.com/introduction Nishonoseki stable

Sport
- Sport: Sumo
- Retired: January 2019
- Heya: Tagonoura
- Record: 800–496–97
- Debut: March 2002
- Highest rank: Yokozuna (January 2017)
- Elder name: Nishonoseki
- Championships: 2 (Makuuchi); 1 (Makushita)
- Special Prizes: Outstanding Performance (5); Fighting Spirit (3); Technique (1)
- Gold Stars: 3 Hakuhō (2); Asashōryū
- Updated on Jan 16, 2019

Kisenosato Yutaka (Japanese: 稀勢の里 寛, Hepburn: Kisenosato Yutaka; born July 3, 1986, as Yutaka Hagiwara (萩原 寛, Hagiwara Yutaka)) is a Japanese sumo elder from Ibaraki. As a wrestler, he made his professional debut in 2002 and reached the top makuuchi division in 2004 at the age of just 18. After many years in the junior san'yaku ranks, he reached the second highest rank of ōzeki in January 2012. He earned three kinboshi or gold stars by defeating yokozuna in his career leading up to ōzeki and nine special prizes. He scored more than 20 double-digit winning records at the ōzeki rank. In 2016, he secured the most wins in the calendar year, the first wrestler to do so without winning a tournament in that year.

After being a runner-up in a tournament on twelve occasions, he broke through at the January 2017 tournament, winning his first top division championship or yūshō with a 14–1 record and subsequently was promoted to yokozuna, the first Japanese-born wrestler to reach sumo's highest rank since Wakanohana in 1998. He had been a candidate four times previously (July 2013, January 2014, July 2016 and September 2016), but in each case, he failed to achieve the necessary number of wins. Kisenosato won his first tournament as a yokozuna in March 2017, but suffered a left chest muscle injury in the process and was not able to complete another tournament until September 2018. His eight straight missed tournaments were a record for a yokozuna. His 12 runner-up finishes are the most in history. In January 2019, he announced his retirement from sumo. He is now an elder of the Japan Sumo Association under the name of Nishonoseki Yutaka (二所ノ関 寛).

== Early life and sumo background ==
Yutaka Hagiwara was born in Ashiya, Hyōgo, but moved to Ryūgasaki, Ibaraki, when he was two years old. In his second year of middle school, he moved to neighbouring Ushiku but continued to attend school in Ryūgasaki. Though Hagiwara was a fan of watching sumo from a young age, he was on his school's baseball teams as a pitcher in primary and junior high school. He eventually gave up when he realized he was excelling only because of his size. On a chance meeting with the head of Naruto stable, the former yokozuna Takanosato, the stablemaster convinced Hagiwara's initially skeptical parents that he was a great candidate for sumo. Hagiwara eventually joined the stable upon finishing junior high school. The stable was known for its strict environment and the oyakata would encourage him to always use forward-moving techniques in training to better prepare him for tournament situations, rather than go for a quick win by stepping backward.

== Career ==
He fought his first bout in March 2002 under his real name. He rose quickly through the divisions, entering the second-highest jūryō division in May 2004, aged 17 years and 9 months, the second youngest ever jūryō wrestler after Takanohana, whom Hagiwara had idolised when he was a boy. Three tournaments later, in November 2004, he entered the top makuuchi division, again the second youngest (18 years and 3 months) after Takanohana. To mark his entry into the top division his stablemaster gave him the shikona or ring surname of Kisenosato.

His first major top division result was 12 wins against three losses in the September 2005 tournament, where he was awarded the Fighting Spirit special prize. He was promoted to the rank of komusubi in July 2006, which he held until March 2007 when he fell back to maegashira 1.

Early in his top division career, Kisenosato was involved in some controversial bouts with yokozuna Asashōryū. He defeated him for the first time in September 2006 and was awarded the Outstanding Performance Prize. Shaken by this, Asashōryū responded in the next tournament by leaping to the side at the tachi-ai and employing a highly unusual leg-kicking technique called ketaguri. Afterwards, Asashōryū was criticised by the Yokozuna Deliberation Committee for using this rare move. In March 2007 Kisenosato slapped Asashōryū around the face during their match. Asashōryū was so riled by this that he gave Kisenosato a small kick in the back after the bout was over, which prompted much criticism from the Japanese media.

In July 2007 Kisenosato turned in a strong 11–4 record and derailed Kotomitsuki's hopes of a tournament championship on the final day by slapping him down. This earned him a promotion back to komusubi in September 2007. Kisenosato defeated Asashōryū once again in the yokozuna's comeback tournament in January 2008, earning him his first kinboshi or gold star, (his first win over Asashōryū had been at komusubi rank so he was ineligible then), and his second Outstanding Performance prize. After this performance, he was named one of seven wrestlers who NHK commentator Shūhei Nagao (the former Mainoumi) called the "Seven Samurai" and identified as "holding the key" to a Japanese resurgence in sumo, which was dominated by foreigners in the top ranks. (The others were Gōeidō, Kotoshōgiku, Hōmashō, Toyohibiki, Toyonoshima and Tochiōzan). Returning to komusubi in the March 2008 tournament, Kisenosato lost to Asashōryū on opening day but defeated three out of four ōzeki and held his rank with an 8–7 score.

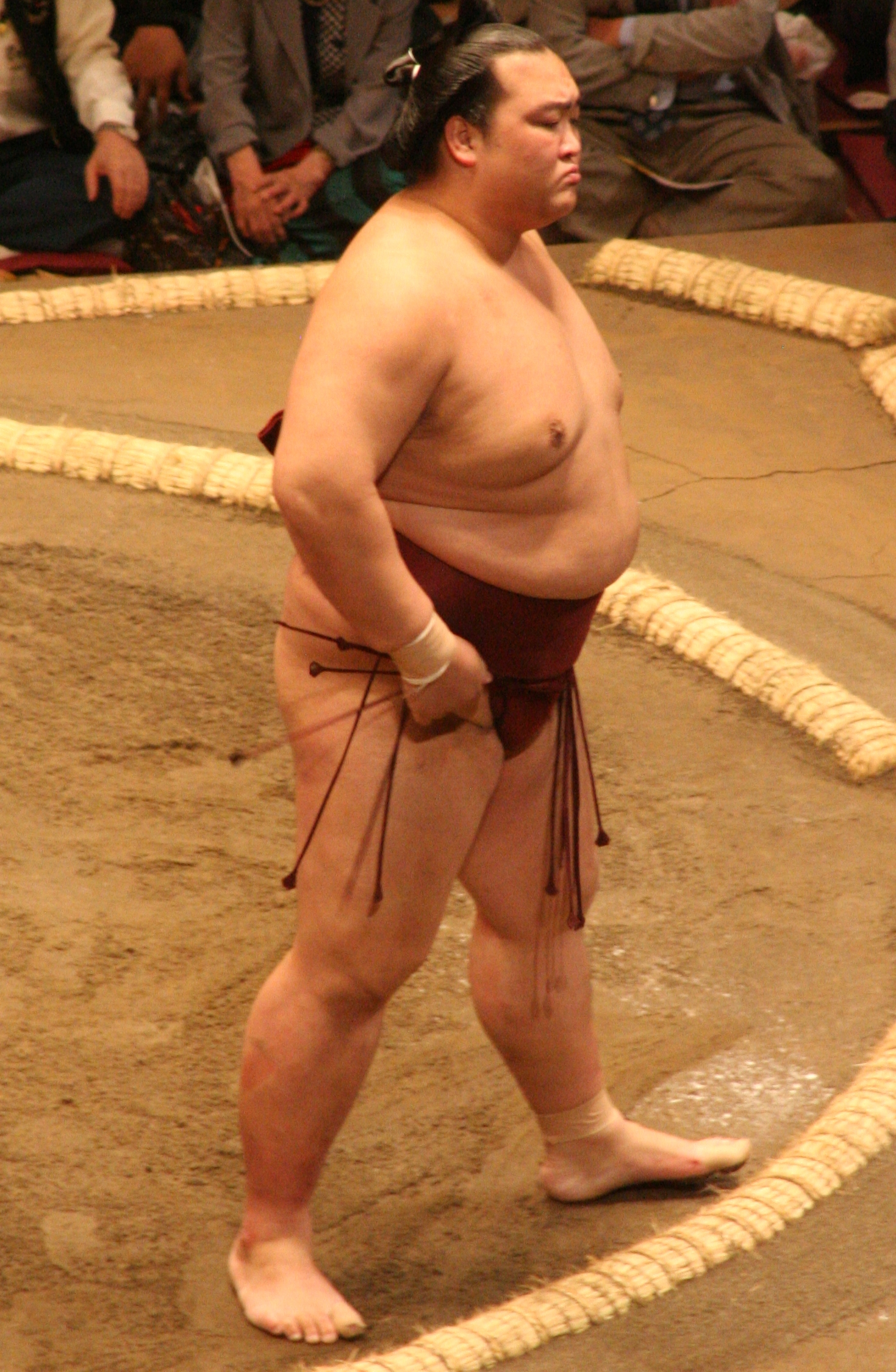
Kisenosato in May 2009

In May 2008 he scored another win over Asashōryū on opening day, finishing with a strong 10–5 record and a share of the Fighting Spirit prize. Despite this he was not promoted to sekiwake, only the third time since 15-day tournaments were introduced in 1949 that a komusubi with ten wins has not moved up the rankings. Kisenosato spent nine tournaments at komusubi without making sekiwake, which had only happened to three previous wrestlers, Dewanishiki, Fujinishiki and Takamiyama. Back in the maegashira ranks for the September 2008 tournament, he was the only man to defeat tournament winner Hakuhō, earning him his second kinboshi, but he fell short with six wins against nine losses.

In November 2008 Kisenosato scored 11–4, sending him to komusubi for the fifth time in the January 2009 tournament. He scored eight wins there, and Aminishiki's losing record meant Kisenosato finally made his long-awaited sekiwake debut in March 2009, in his tenth tournament at a san'yaku rank. He produced a somewhat disappointing 5–10 record and was demoted to maegashira 4 in May. However, he proved this rank was too low for him by producing a 13–2 record, his best-ever top division score, and winning his third Fighting Spirit prize. This performance returned him immediately to sekiwake for the July 2009 tournament. He came through with a good 9–6 score there, defeating Asashōryū (for the fourth time) and three ōzeki. In September he failed on the final day to get kachi-koshi but remained in the san'yaku ranks at komusubi for the November 2009 tournament. However, a 6–9 in Kyushu saw him drop back to the maegashira ranks.

In January 2010 he won his first five matches, before losing five in a row. He finished on 9–6 and returned to komusubi for the March tournament. He remained in san'yaku for the next three tournaments but fell back to maegashira 1 in November 2010. On the second day of the Kyushu tournament, he upset Hakuhō, bringing to an end the yokozuna's post-war record of 63 consecutive victories. He was rewarded with the Outstanding Performance prize and promotion back to sekiwake. He defeated Hakuhō once again in the following tournament, scoring 10–5 and winning another Outstanding Performance award, his fourth. Japan Sumo Association official Takanohana said after the tournament that Kisenosato would be considered for promotion to ōzeki if he won at least 13 bouts in the March 2011 honbasho, which would give him 33 wins over three tournaments (the usual minimum requirement for ōzeki). However, that tournament never took place due to a match-fixing scandal and in the subsequent 'technical examination' tournament in May, he secured a majority of wins only on the final day.

=== Promotion to ōzeki ===
After a solid 10–5 score in July, in the September 2011 tournament Kisenosato raced to an 8–0 start, before losing three in a row. However, he then rebounded by beating Hakuhō for the third time in their last five meetings on Day 12. He finished runner-up alongside Kotoshōgiku on 12–3, his first-ever runner-up performance, and also shared the Outstanding Performance prize. With 22 wins in the last two tournaments, he was once again a candidate for promotion to ōzeki in November. However, with a record of 10–4 going into his match on the final day, he lost to Kotoshōgiku. This gave him a record of "only" 32 wins in three tournaments, below the Association's loosely defined ōzeki promotion standard of 33, but the Sumo Association had already indicated before the match took place that he had done enough to earn promotion. This was the second successive tournament to feature an ōzeki promotion, following Kotoshōgiku. Kisenosato credited his success to his late stablemaster, the former yokozuna Takanosato, who had died suddenly shortly before the tournament. "Everything that he taught me about sumo led to this result and I'm so grateful." He had long been regarded as one of the most promising Japanese sumo wrestlers, but before reaching ōzeki there had been concern expressed about his seeming inability to hold down a san'yaku position and a possible lack of fighting spirit. His stablemaster had also criticized him in 2010 for his attitude in training. Kisenosato's promotion was made official on 30 November, following a unanimous vote by the Sumo Association's executive board. Chairman Hanaregoma commented, "He has been solid through the last several tournaments. I want him to start putting himself in title contention."

=== Ōzeki career ===
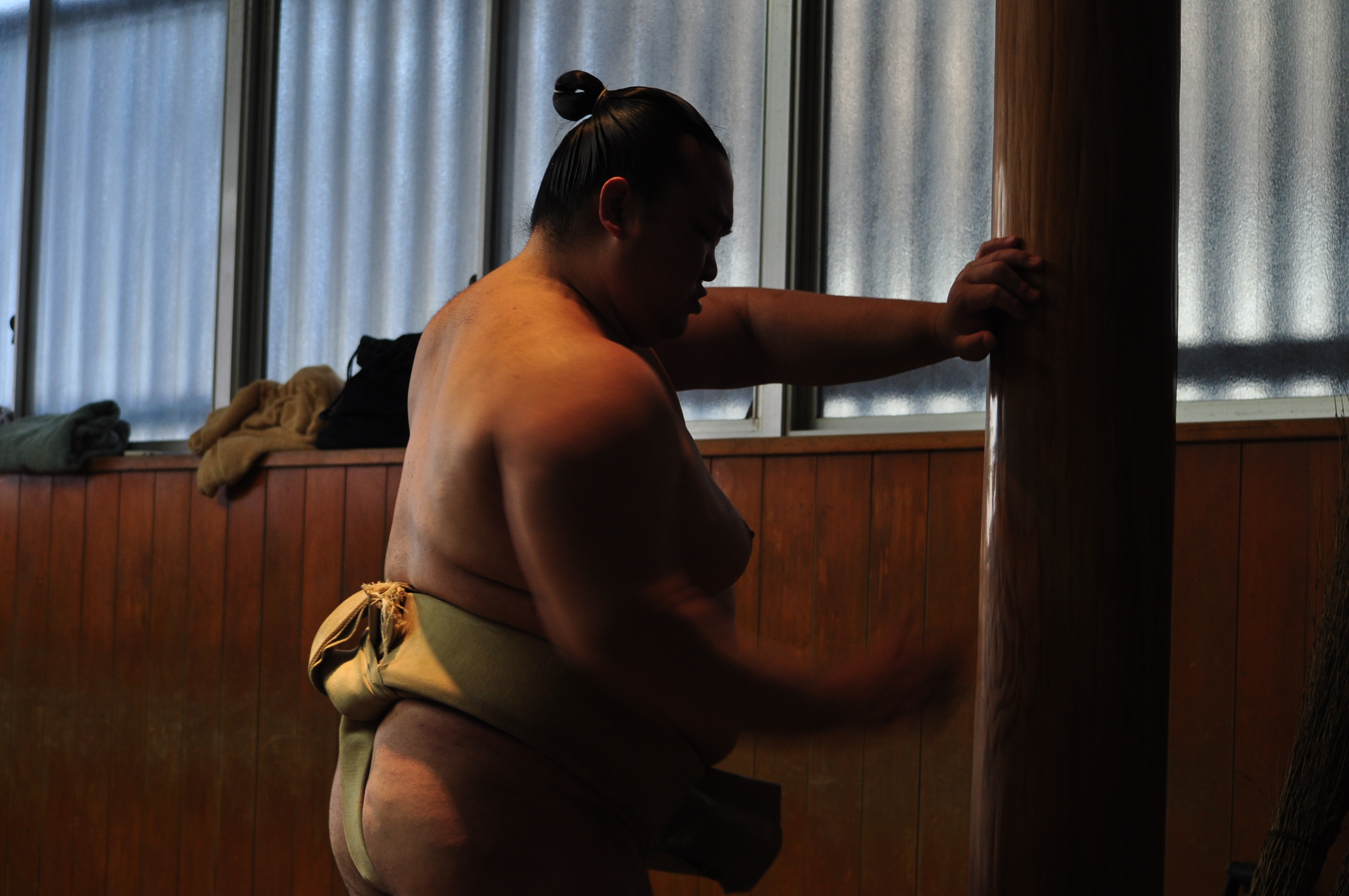
Kisenosato training in January 2014

Kisenosato produced an 11–4 record in his debut ōzeki tournament in January 2012. In the May 2012 tournament, he was leading the yūshō race after twelve days, the first Japanese-born wrestler to do so at that stage since Tochiazuma in 2007, but a loss against Hakuhō on Day 13 meant he was caught up by rank–and–filers Kyokutenhō and Tochiōzan, and a final day loss to Baruto meant he finished on 11–4 and missed out on a playoff for the championship. In the next five tournaments, he produced five double-figure scores, but only just, as they were all 10–5. However, in the May 2013 tournament, he won his first thirteen matches, making a strong case for a possible start at a run for yokozuna promotion, but he was defeated by Hakuhō on Day 14, and he also lost his final day bout to Kotoshōgiku to finish two wins behind Hakuhō on 13–2. In July 2013 he stopped Hakuhō's streak of 43 consecutive victories by beating him on the 14th day – the third time he has ended a significant winning run of the yokozuna, having also defeated Hakuhō after his 63 wins in a row in November 2010 and 23 in January 2011. After the November 2013 tournament, in which he was runner-up for the fourth time in a row, Kisenosato was told by the Sumo Association that he would be promoted if he won the championship with at least 13 wins, but he collapsed in the following January basho and won only seven bouts. He pulled out on the final day, missing the first bout of his career. He maintained his ōzeki status with a 9–6 result in March 2014 and was never in danger of demotion again. He finished runner-up in May 2014, January 2015, and May 2015.

In the second half of 2015, Kisenosato maintained his consistent form: he went 10–5 in July (including a win over Kakuryū), 11–4 in September, and 10–5 in November (beating Harumafuji on the final day). After a moderate 9–6 in January 2016, he was back to his best in March, recording 13 wins and finishing runner-up to Hakuhō. He was runner-up for the tenth time in his career in the May 2016 tournament, finishing 13–2 and having been at 12–0 before losing to Hakuhō and Kakuryū on consecutive days.

Kisenosato went into the July 2016 tournament with the possibility of being promoted to yokozuna if he could win the tournament, however, he was unable to clinch a victory and was runner-up for the eleventh time, and the third time in a row. He was criticized by Hideshige Moriya, chair of the Yokozuna Deliberation Council, for the manner of his defeat to the eventual winner Harumafuji on Day 13, which saw him fall to 10–3: "The way he lost to Harumafuji made him unworthy of recommendation [for promotion]." He finished this tournament with a 12–3 record. His fourth bid for yokozuna promotion in September failed in two losses in the first three days, to Okinoumi on the opening day and Tochinoshin on Day 3, and a final score of 10–5. In the November 2016 tournament, Kisenosato was runner-up for the twelfth time in his career finishing with a 12–3 record including victories over all three yokozuna (dealing yokozuna Kakuryū, the victor of the tournament, his only loss). He also won against ōzeki Gōeidō and ōzeki Terunofuji. His three losses were against Endō, Shōdai, and Tochinoshin. Kisenosato finished out 2016 with the most victories in a calendar year getting 69 wins. Harumafuji had 67 wins, and Hakuhō (who sat out one tournament) had 62 wins. He is the first wrestler in the modern era of sumo to do this without winning a tournament. In 2016 Kisenosato was runner-up four times, and under yokozuna promotion consideration twice.

Kisenosato started off the January 2017 tournament very strong, winning his first 8 days straight, however on day 9 Kisenosato lost to fellow ōzeki Kotoshōgiku. This did not put him off leading the tournament since Hakuhō also lost on day 9. Kisenosato won the remaining days of the tournament. On Day 14, Kisenosato secured his much-anticipated first career top-division championship with a win over Ichinojō and a Hakuhō loss against Takanoiwa. His first championship came in his 31st tournament as an ōzeki, longer than any other ōzeki since the Shōwa era began in 1926. He defeated yokozuna Hakuhō on Day 15 to conclude the tournament with a 14–1 record.

=== Promotion to yokozuna ===
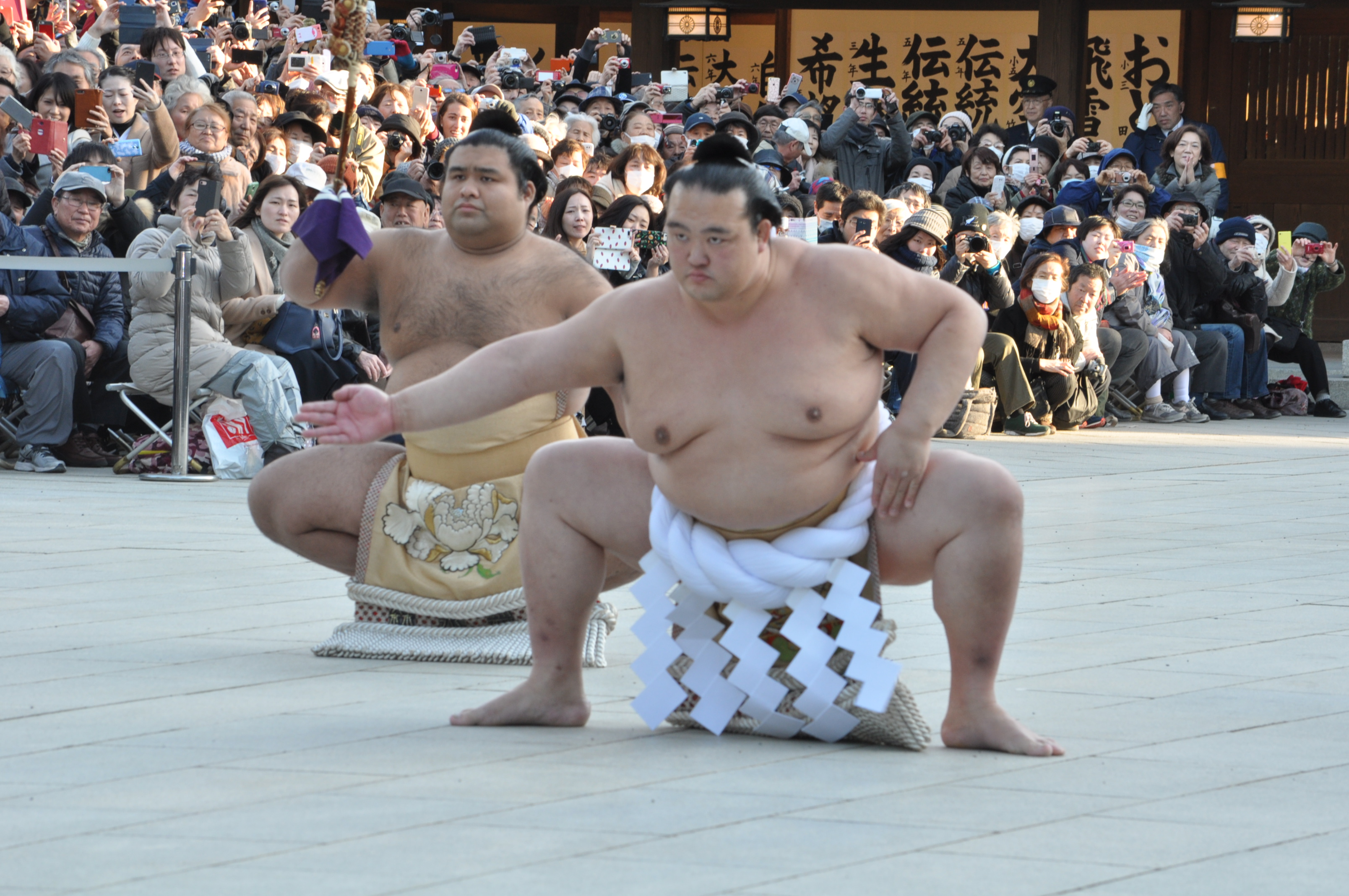
Kisenosato performing his first yokozuna ring-entering ceremony at the Meiji Shrine in Tokyo (27 January 2017)

Having won his first tournament in January 2017, combined with his overall 2016 record (including four runner-up finishes), Kisenosato was considered for promotion to the yokozuna rank. The Japan Sumo Association's Yokozuna Deliberation Council met on January 23, 2017, and determined that Kisenosato was a suitable candidate. The Board of Directors accepted the council's recommendation two days later. Shortly after the Board of Directors met on January 25, 2017, two envoys conveyed the decision to Kisenosato and his stablemaster. Kisenosato accepted, formally becoming the 72nd yokozuna. He was the first wrestler of Japanese descent to be promoted to yokozuna since Wakanohana in 1998. As is the tradition for a new yokozuna, he performed his first yokozuna dohyō-iri, or ring-entering ceremony, on January 27 at Meiji Shrine in Tokyo. He chose to use the Unryū style of ring entrance ceremony after studying footage of previous yokozuna and practicing until late the previous night to master the technique. His stablemate Takayasu acted as sword carrier while Shōhōzan took the role of dew sweeper.

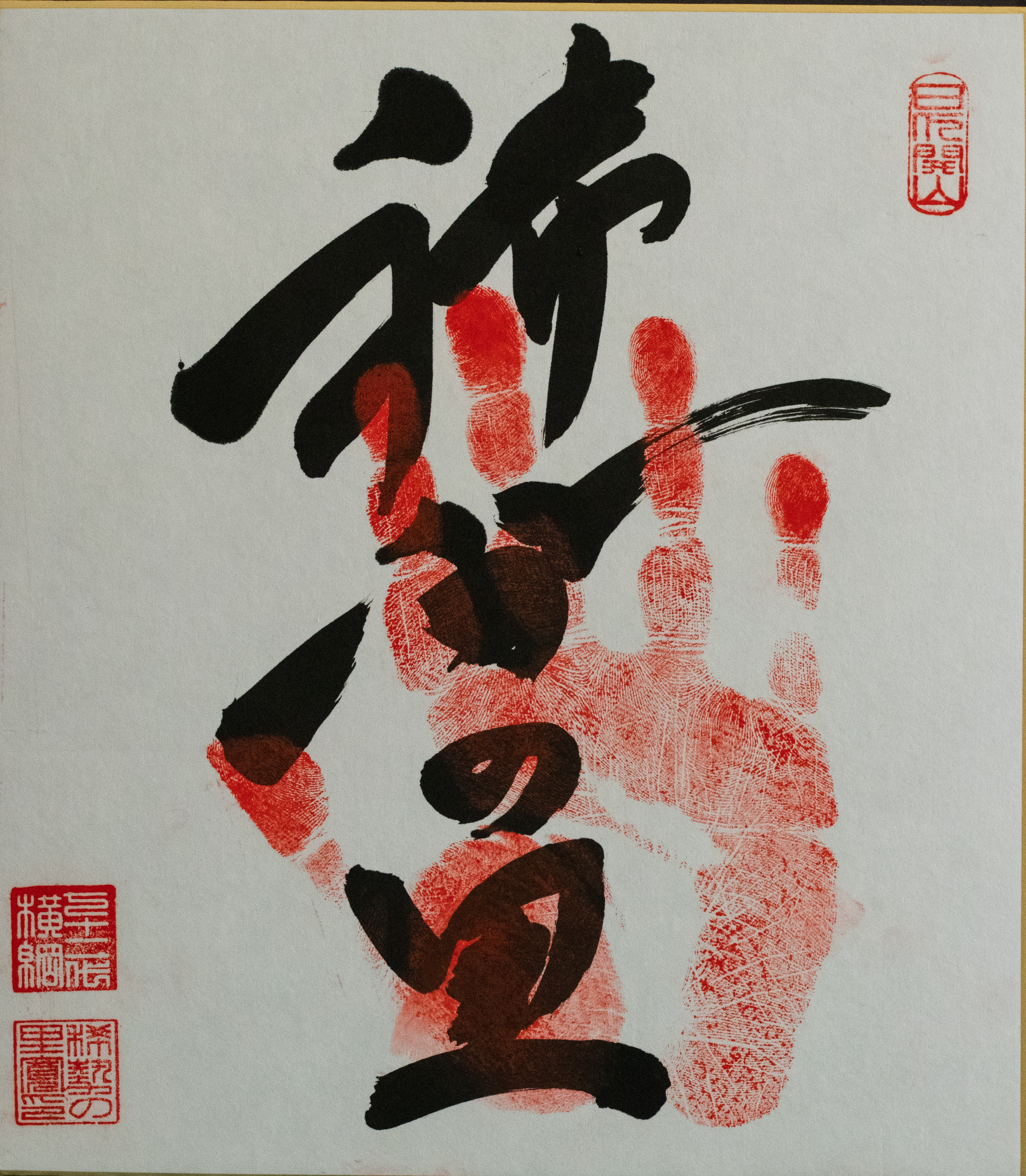
Kisenosato original yokozuna tegata (handprint and signature)

=== Yokozuna career ===
Kisenosato was listed on the west side of the new banzuke released on February 27, 2017, the first Japanese born wrestler to appear as a yokozuna on the ranking sheets since Takanohana retired in January 2003. He told a press conference, "My mission is to always be involved in the championship title race. That is an absolute must." At Osaka in March he began impressively, winning his first twelve matches to lead the tournament but was defeated by Harumafuji on day 13 sustaining shoulder and chest injuries as he fell from the dohyō. Despite leaving the arena with his arm in a sling, his stablemaster said Kisenosato was not immediately withdrawing from the tournament and would fight on Day 14. However he lost easily to Kakuryū. On the final day of the tournament, Kisenosato defeated Terunofuji to tie him with a record of 13–2 and force a playoff. In spite of his injured shoulder, Kisenosato won the playoff match beating Terunofuji again to win the tournament, his second in a row. This victory made him the first newly promoted yokozuna in 22 years to have won his debut tournament. His medical certificate was published by the Japan Sumo Association after the tournament, indicating injuries to his left chest muscle and left upper arm, with a month-long recovery period. He skipped the regional tour in April to allow his injuries to heal.

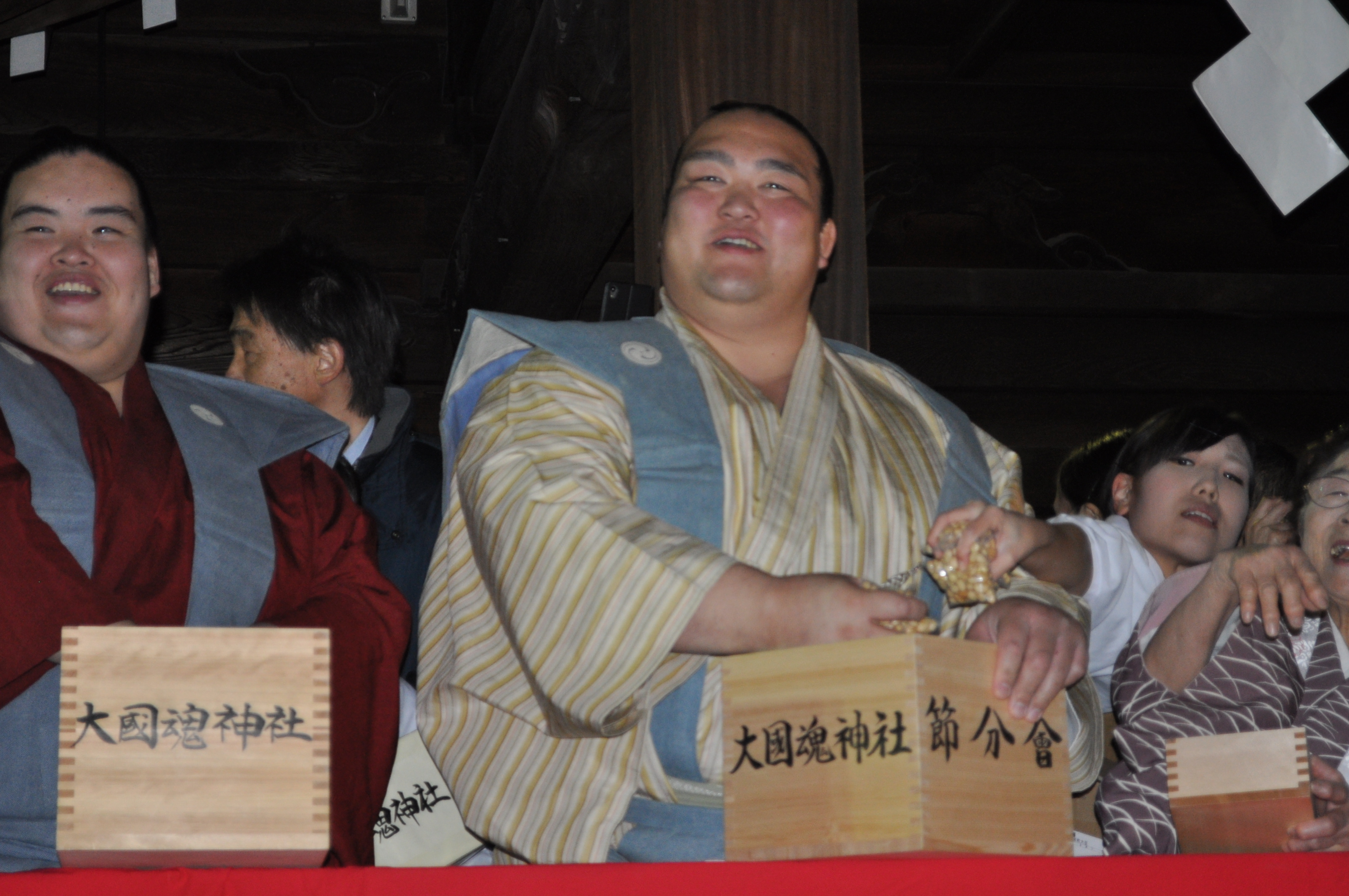
Kisenosato throwing beans at Ōkunitama Shrine during setsubun, 2017

He was ranked as the top East Yokozuna on the May 2017 banzuke, the first time a Japanese wrestler held the highest position since Takanohana in July 2001. He withdrew from the tournament on Day 11 having lost four matches, due to his failure to recover from his upper body injuries and inability to use his left arm properly. Nishiiwa Oyakata, a coach at Tagonoura stable, said that Kisenosato had suffered from a lack of preparation time. "He only had about a week to practice against wrestlers before the meet. You would usually train for about a month after healing from injury, so I wish he had more time. I hope he will be able to live up to fans' expectations at the Nagoya basho." The only previous time Kisenosato had withdrawn from a tournament in his 15-year career was the final day of the January 2014 tournament. Kisenosato declared himself fit for the July tournament but lost to Mitakeumi on opening day and Tochinoshin on Day 3. He then withdrew from the tournament on Day 6 after suffering a left ankle ligament injury in his defeat the previous day to Ikioi. His stablemaster said, "The pain in his left arm seems to be gone but he hasn't been able to put on good sumo." He began full training for the September basho with 13 practice bouts with Yago of the jūryō division on September 4, but admitted he "had a long way to go." Shibatayama Oyakata commented, "He is not in a condition to engage in bouts at a sumo tournament. I felt that he was just testing how much he has recovered from his injuries." On September 7 Kisenosato's stablemaster confirmed that he would sit out the tournament, saying "it takes courage to rest, and I hope this break will turn things in the right direction." He returned for the November 2017 tournament in Kyushu but pulled out on Day 10, having already given away five kinboshi to maegashira ranked wrestlers, tying the record for the most conceded in one tournament since 15 day honbasho were established in 1949. Kisenosato's stablemaster said he was suffering from a contusion in his lower back and a left leg ligament injury.

He entered the January 2018 tournament but withdrew on Day 6 with a 1–4 record having suffered three successive defeats to maegashira. His stablemaster indicated that Kisenosato had injured the left pectoralis major muscle of his chest, near his old injury. This marked the fifth successive tournament that he had either failed to enter or dropped out of. Having received criticism for repeatedly returning to action without healing properly, Kisenosato said that the outcome of the next tournament in which he competes will determine whether or not he continues his career. He did not enter the March 2018 tournament, and his decision not to participate in May meant a failure to complete seven straight tournaments, equalling the longest absence for a yokozuna since the six tournaments a year system began in 1958. On July 2 Kisenosato faced Hakuhō in a training session held at Kokonoe stable, the first time the two yokozuna had met in the practice ring in over a year, but he ultimately decided not to enter the July basho. Missing his eighth straight tournament, Kisenosato said, "Although I have been trying desperately to be in shape, I decided to withdraw since I haven't made enough progress. I will put everything into competing at the next meet."

Kisenosato fully participated in the Yokozuna Deliberation Council's sōken or training session shortly before the September 2018 tournament. He said, "I'm fully prepared. I did everything there is to be done," and his stablemaster said Kisenosato was in the best condition since his injury. He finished the tournament with a 10–5 record, the first time he has completed a tournament since March 2017. He met Hakuhō on the 13th day for the 60th time, but the first time as a yokozuna. Hakuhō defeated Kisenosato but said after the tournament, "I think he did a fine job. He is someone who will propel the sport to greater prosperity." He was the sole yokozuna to enter the November 2018 tournament, but lost his opening three bouts, and seemed to observers to be still suffering from a lack of power in his left upper body. He became the first yokozuna to lose his first three matches since Asahifuji in January 1992. On Day 4 he was defeated by Tochiōzan, the first yokozuna since Miyagiyama in 1931 to lose his first four bouts. He withdrew from the tournament the following day, citing an injury to his right knee suffered on the opening day (unrelated to his previous injury problems). After the tournament he received an "encouragement" from the Yokozuna Deliberation Council, which indicates that his performance is considered to be below that of yokozuna standard. The council had not previously issued any sort of resolution on the previous occasions in which Kisenosato had withdrawn or abstained from participating in a tournament. Kisenosato pulled out of the winter regional tour, but on December 25 he told reporters he intended to compete in the January 2019 tournament.

=== Retirement ===
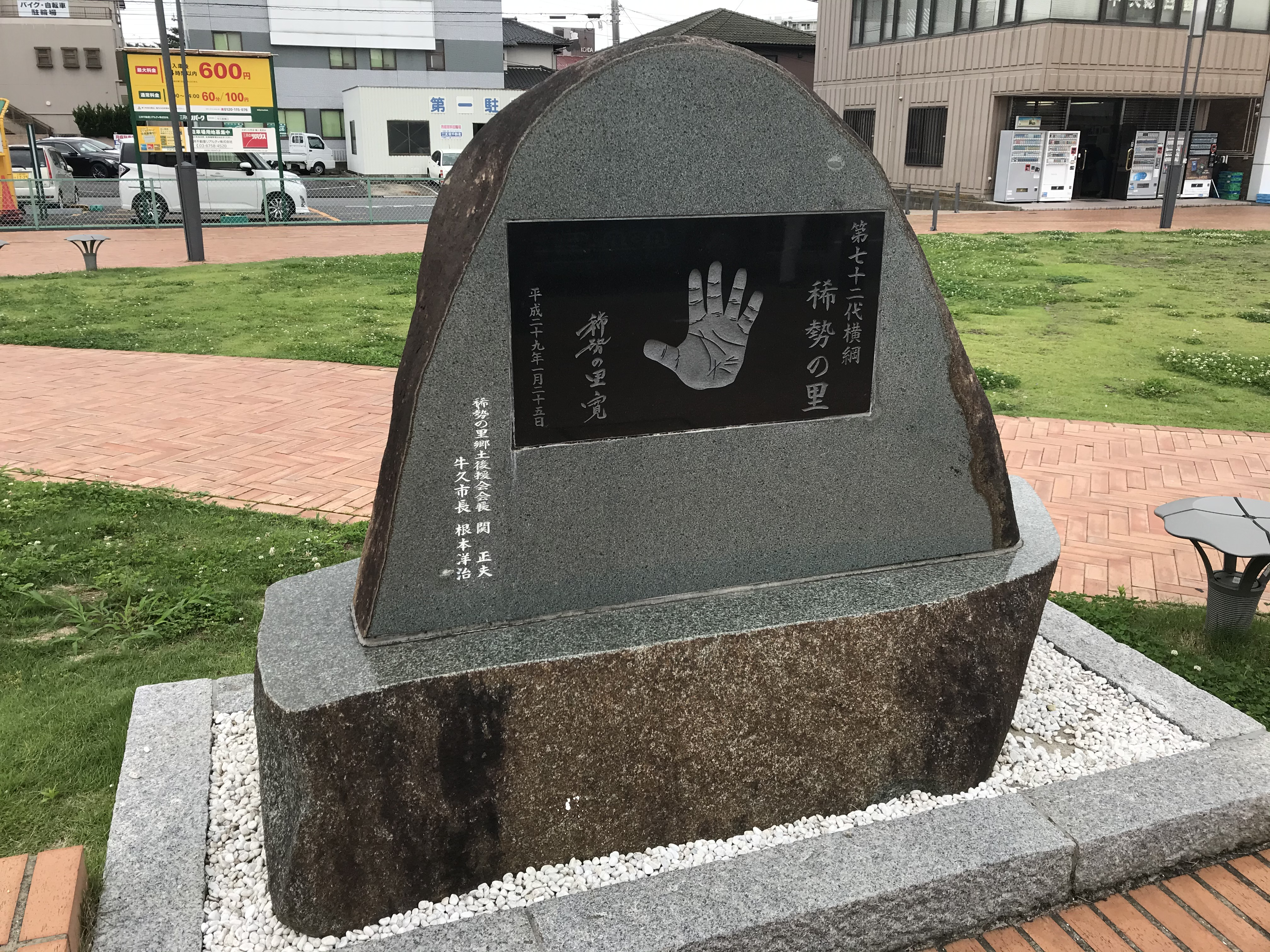
A stone monument honouring Kisenosato at Ushiku Station

Kisenosato was listed as the top yokozuna on the January 2019 banzuke, despite not winning a match in November, because the other two yokozuna had sat out completely. He lost his opening three bouts of the tournament, giving him a sequence of eight straight losses from the last day of the September 2018 tournament (not counting defaults), the worst by a yokozuna since 15-day tournaments were established in 1949. On the morning of the fourth day of the tournament, stablemaster Tagonoura announced that Kisenosato had decided to retire from the sport. His stablemaster said, "It was his decision. He told me he could no longer perform at the level he wanted to."

In a press conference on January 16, 2019, Kisenosato said "I'm retiring as a wrestler in the ongoing tournament and assuming the name of Araiso as a sumo elder." He further went on to say, "Even though it's very regrettable that I wasn't able to live up to everyone's expectations as a yokozuna, I don't regret one bit of my career on the dohyo." When mentioning the injury he suffered in March 2017, he said, "Since the injury, I was confident that I was doing the best I could. I wrestled with everything I had in the world, but I felt for the first time that I was unable to go on." Further saying, "I was gradually recovering, but I was unable to wrestle in my own style. My condition couldn't return to that before I was injured." Kisenosato also expressed his gratitude to his supporters saying, "I was supported by so many people... I have nothing but gratitude." His stablemaster Tagonoura said of the retirement, "I was delighted when he became yokozuna but when you see him closely, you can tell that he was struggling a lot. These two years went like a flash." Hakuhō on learning of Kisenosato's retirement said, "It's lonely now. I've run out of words to express my appreciation for his efforts." Chief Cabinet Secretary Yoshihide Suga said during his daily briefing that, "I would like to give honor to what he has achieved and to send hearty cheers to Kisenosato."

== After retirement ==
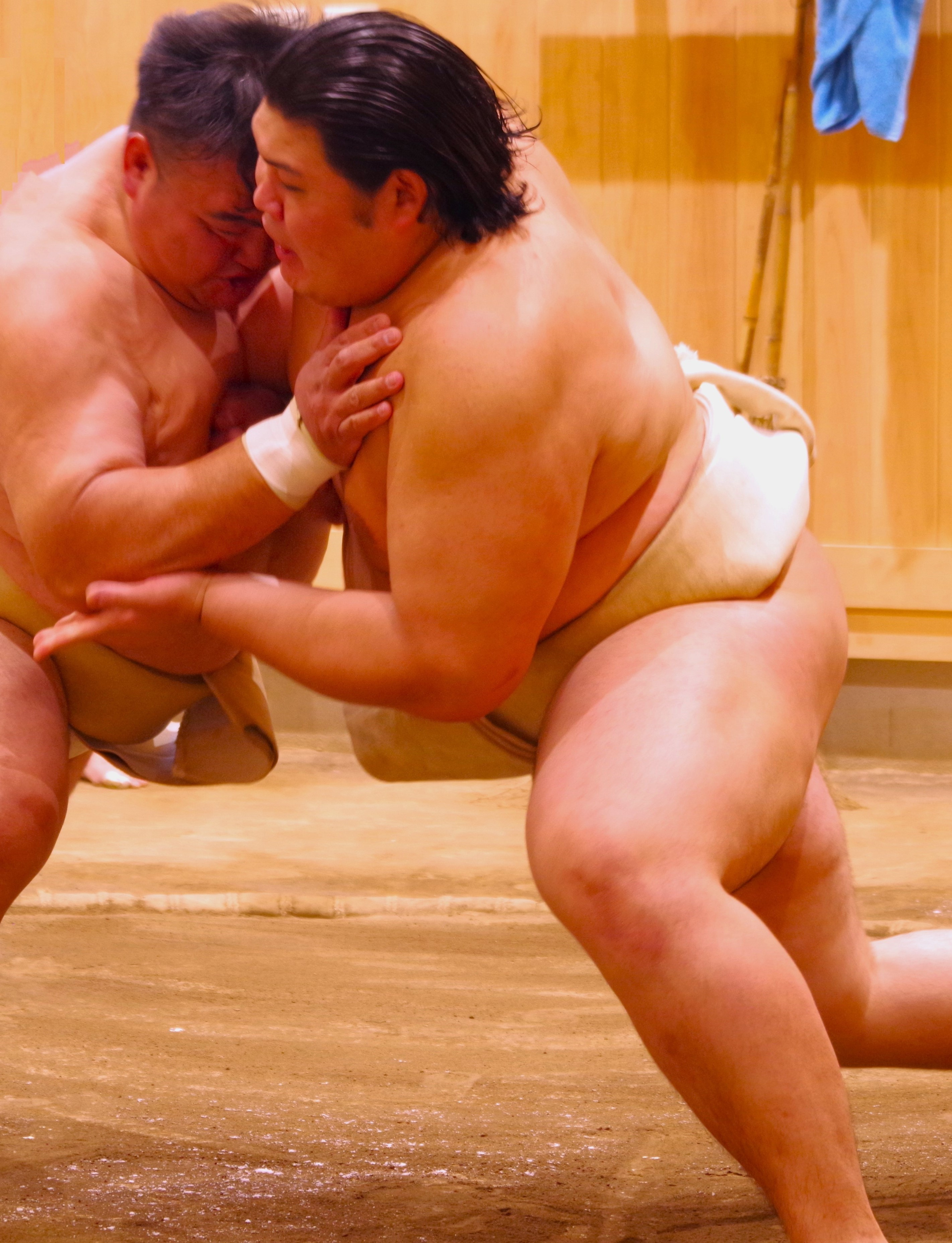
Kisenosato training with Ōnosato in December 2023

Kisenosato remained in sumo as a coach for Tagonoura stable under the elder name Araiso (荒磯) for the mandatory one-year period before planning to open his own stable. He initially looked for premises in the area between Akihabara Station and Asakusabashi Station. His official retirement ceremony (danpatsu-shiki) was held on September 29, 2019. To help him prepare for being a head coach he took a one-year sports science research master's course at Waseda University graduate school, his thesis being "A new way to run a sumo stable". In May 2021 the Sumo Association gave permission for him to open up his own stable effective August 1. Initially located in Tsukuba, Ibaraki, the stable will eventually be based in Inashiki when construction is completed in May 2022. Kisenosato took four wrestlers from Tagonoura stable with him when the stable first opened.

In December 2021 it was announced that Kisenosato would be changing his elder name to Nishonoseki, to coincide with the previous holder of the name, former ōzeki Wakashimazu, reaching the mandatory retirement age of 65 in January 2022. Araiso stable was accordingly renamed Nishonoseki stable. Kisenosato was appointed as a shimpan (ringside judge) in March 2022. He made his debut as a judge at the May 2022 tournament.

Just under a year after establishing his own stable, Nishonoseki raised his first sekitori with Tomokaze, who had been transferred from Oguruma stable, achieving this status again after a long period of injury. Three months later, in July 2023, Nishonoseki stable had a double promotion to sekitori with Ōnosato, a protégé of Kisenosato, and Takahashi achieving this status at the same time for the September tournament and becoming the first two wrestlers recruited by Nishonoseki to achieve this status. Ōnosato has won five tournaments in the makuuchi division since his promotion, and under Nishonoseki's coaching has become sumo's 75th yokozuna.

Nishonoseki was issued a strict warning by the Sumo Association in April 2024 along with Ōnosato, after reporting that Ōnosato had been drinking with an underage wrestler in his stable back in September 2023. Ōnosato won the top-division championship for Nishonoseki stable the following month.

== Fighting style ==
Kisenosato was mainly a yotsu-sumo wrestler, and his favourite grip on his opponent's mawashi was hidari-yotsu, or right hand outside, left hand inside. His most common winning kimarite was yorikiri (force out), followed by oshidashi (push out) and tsukiotoshi (thrust over). He was criticized for frequently stalling at the tachi-ai, or initial charge, in an attempt to unsettle his opponent. Kisenosato's injury in March 2017 prevented him from using his favoured defensive technique of ottsuke, where he traps his opponent's arm with his left. He had been encouraged by his first stablemaster, Naruto Oyakata, to base his style on his powerful left arm, and after the injury commentators noted that it appeared difficult for him to adapt and use his right in tournament bouts. Kisenosato confirmed this in an interview after his retirement, saying "My left chest muscle became weak after that injury, and my opponents were able to easily escape my attempts for a hold. My physician proposed an idea to tape up the affected area, but I didn't want people seeing me like that. The injury limited my range of motion and I wasn't able to do the things I'd easily done before."

== Career record ==
Kisenosato Yutaka
Year	January Hatsu basho, Tokyo	March Haru basho, Osaka	May Natsu basho, Tokyo	July Nagoya basho, Nagoya	September Aki basho, Tokyo	November Kyūshū basho, Fukuoka
2002	x	(Maezumo)	East Jonokuchi #26; 6–1	East Jonidan #61; 6–1	West Sandanme #95; 4–3	West Sandanme #77; 5–2
2003	West Sandanme #49; 5–2	West Sandanme #21; 3–4	East Sandanme #37; 7–0–P	East Makushita #25; 3–4	West Makushita #35; 5–2	East Makushita #25; 4–3
2004	East Makushita #18; 7–0; Champion	East Makushita #1; 5–2	West Jūryō #12; 9–6	East Jūryō #6; 8–7	West Jūryō #3; 9–6	West Maegashira #16; 9–6
2005	East Maegashira #12; 6–9	West Maegashira #15; 8–7	West Maegashira #11; 5–10	West Maegashira #15; 7–8	West Maegashira #16; 12–3; F	East Maegashira #5; 5–10
2006	East Maegashira #9; 8–7	East Maegashira #7; 10–5	East Maegashira #1; 8–7	West Komusubi #1; 8–7	East Komusubi #1; 8–7; O	East Komusubi #1; 8–7
2007	East Komusubi #1; 7–8	East Maegashira #1; 6–9	West Maegashira #3; 6–9	West Maegashira #6; 11–4	East Komusubi #1; 6–9	East Maegashira #2; 9–6
2008	East Maegashira #1; 10–5; O★	East Komusubi #1; 8–7	East Komusubi #1; 10–5; F	East Komusubi #1; 6–9	East Maegashira #2; 6–9 ★	East Maegashira #4; 11–4
2009	East Komusubi #1; 8–7	West Sekiwake #1; 5–10	East Maegashira #4; 13–2; F	West Sekiwake #1; 9–6	East Sekiwake #1; 7–8	East Komusubi #1; 6–9
2010	West Maegashira #3; 9–6	East Komusubi #1; 9–6	East Sekiwake #1; 8–7	East Sekiwake #1; 7–8	East Komusubi #1; 7–8	East Maegashira #1; 10–5; O★
2011	East Sekiwake #1; 10–5; O	West Sekiwake #1; Tournament Cancelled; Match fixing investigation 0–0–0	West Sekiwake #1; 8–7	West Sekiwake #1; 10–5	West Sekiwake #1; 12–3; O	East Sekiwake #1; 10–5; T
2012	West Ōzeki #3; 11–4	East Ōzeki #2; 9–6	East Ōzeki #2; 11–4	East Ōzeki #1; 10–5	West Ōzeki #1; 10–5	West Ōzeki #1; 10–5
2013	East Ōzeki #1; 10–5	East Ōzeki #1; 10–5	East Ōzeki #1; 13–2	East Ōzeki #1; 11–4	East Ōzeki #1; 11–4	East Ōzeki #1; 13–2
2014	East Ōzeki #1; 7–8	East Ōzeki #2; 9–6	East Ōzeki #1; 13–2	East Ōzeki #1; 9–6	West Ōzeki #1; 9–6	West Ōzeki #1; 11–4
2015	East Ōzeki #1; 11–4	East Ōzeki #1; 9–6	East Ōzeki #1; 11–4	East Ōzeki #1; 10–5	West Ōzeki #1; 11–4	West Ōzeki #1; 10–5
2016	East Ōzeki #1; 9–6	West Ōzeki #1; 13–2	East Ōzeki #1; 13–2	East Ōzeki #1; 12–3	East Ōzeki #1; 10–5	West Ōzeki #1; 12–3
2017	East Ōzeki #1; 14–1	West Yokozuna #2; 13–2–P	East Yokozuna #1; 6–5–4	East Yokozuna #2; 2–4–9	East Yokozuna #2; Sat out due to injury 0–0–15	East Yokozuna #2; 4–6–5
2018	West Yokozuna #1; 1–5–9	East Yokozuna #2; Sat out due to injury 0–0–15	East Yokozuna #2; Sat out due to injury 0–0–15	East Yokozuna #2; Sat out due to injury 0–0–15	East Yokozuna #2; 10–5	East Yokozuna #2; 0–5–10
2019	East Yokozuna #1; Retired; 0–4	x	x	x	x	x
Record given as wins–losses–absences Top division champion Top division runner-up Retired Lower divisions Non-participation Sanshō key: F=Fighting spirit; O=Outstanding performance; T=Technique Also shown: ★=Kinboshi; P=Playoff(s); Divisions: Makuuchi — Jūryō — Makushita — Sandanme — Jonidan — Jonokuchi Makuuchi ranks: Yokozuna — Ōzeki — Sekiwake — Komusubi — Maegashira

== See also ==
- List of yokozuna
- List of sumo tournament top division champions
- List of sumo tournament top division runners-up
- Glossary of sumo terms
- List of sumo record holders
- List of sumo elders
- List of past sumo wrestlers

Preceded by Kakuryū Rikisaburō	72nd Yokozuna; 2017–2019	Succeeded by Terunofuji Haruo
Yokozuna is not a successive rank, and more than one wrestler can hold the title at once
