= 2012 in sumo =

The following are the events in professional sumo during 2012.

== Tournaments ==
=== Hatsu basho ===
Ryōgoku Kokugikan, Tokyo, 8 – 22 January

2012 Hatsu basho results - Makuuchi Division
| W | | L | | A | East | | | Rank | West | | | W | | L | | A |
|---|---|---|---|---|---|---|---|---|---|---|---|---|---|---|---|---|
| 12 | - | 3 | - | 0 | | (Mongolia) | **Hakuhō** | Y | ø | | | | | | | |
| 14 | - | 1 | - | 0 | | (Estonia) | **Baruto** | O | | (Japan) | **Kotoshōgiku** | 8 | - | 7 | - | 0 |
| 10 | - | 5 | - | 0 | | (Bulgaria) | **Kotoōshū** | O | | (Mongolia) | **Harumafuji** | 11 | - | 4 | - | 0 |
| | | | | | ø | | | O | | (Japan) | **Kisenosato** | 11 | - | 4 | | 0 |
| 10 | - | 5 | - | 0 | | (Mongolia) | **Kakuryū** | S | | (Japan) | Toyonoshima | 5 | - | 10 | - | 0 |
| 3 | - | 12 | - | 0 | | (Japan) | Miyabiyama | K | | (Japan) | Wakakōyū | 5 | - | 10 | - | 0 |
| 4 | - | 11 | - | 0 | | (Japan) | Takekaze | M1 | | (Japan) | **Aminishiki** | 9 | - | 6 | - | 0 |
| 4 | - | 11 | - | 0 | | (Japan) | Okinoumi | M2 | | (Japan) | Gōeidō | 6 | - | 9 | - | 0 |
| 2 | - | 13 | - | 0 | | (Japan) | Kitataiki | M3 | | (Japan) | Takayasu | 6 | - | 9 | - | 0 |
| 7 | - | 8 | - | 0 | | (Japan) | Hōmashō | M4 | | (South Korea) | **Tochinowaka** | 8 | - | 7 | - | 0 |
| 9 | - | 6 | - | 0 | | (Japan) | **Myōgiryū** | M5 | | (Japan) | Toyohibiki | 7 | - | 8 | - | 0 |
| 9 | - | 6 | - | 0 | | (Japan) | **Yoshikaze** | M6 | | (Mongolia) | **Kyokutenhō** | 9 | - | 6 | - | 0 |
| 8 | - | 7 | - | 0 | | (Russia) | **Aran** | M7 | | (Bulgaria) | Aoiyama | 6 | - | 9 | - | 0 |
| 8 | - | 7 | - | 0 | | (Japan) | **Shōhōzan** | M8 | | (Japan) | **Tochiōzan** | 11 | - | 4 | - | 0 |
| 10 | - | 5 | - | 0 | | (Georgia (country)) | **Tochinoshin** | M9 | | (Japan) | Daidō | 6 | - | 9 | - | 0 |
| 11 | - | 4 | - | 0 | | (Mongolia) | **Tokitenkū** | M10 | | (Georgia (country)) | **Gagamaru** | 12 | - | 3 | - | 0 |
| 7 | - | 8 | - | 0 | | (Japan) | Fujiazuma | M11 | | (Japan) | **Sadanofuji** | 8 | - | 7 | - | 0 |
| 3 | - | 12 | - | 0 | | (Japan) | Yoshiazuma | M12 | | (Japan) | Tosayutaka | 4 | - | 11 | - | 0 |
| 9 | - | 6 | - | 0 | ø | (Japan) | **Chiyonokuni** | M13 | | (Japan) | **Tenkaihō** | 8 | - | 7 | - | 0 |
| 6 | - | 9 | - | 0 | | (Czech Republic) | Takanoyama | M14 | | (Japan) | Sagatsukasa | 5 | - | 10 | - | 0 |
| 9 | - | 6 | - | 0 | | (Mongolia) | **Asasekiryū** | M15 | | (Mongolia) | Kyokushūhō | 3 | - | 12 | - | 0 |
| 5 | - | 10 | - | 0 | | (Brazil) | Kaisei | M16 | | (Japan) | Nionoumi | 5 | - | 10 | - | 0 |

ø - Indicates a pull-out or absent rank
**winning record in bold**
**Yusho Winner**

=== Haru basho ===
Osaka Prefectural Gymnasium, Osaka, 11 – 25 March

2012 Haru basho results - Makuuchi Division
| W | | L | | A | East | | | Rank | West | | | W | | L | | A |
|---|---|---|---|---|---|---|---|---|---|---|---|---|---|---|---|---|
| 13 | - | 2 | - | 0 | | (Mongolia) | **Hakuhō*** | Y | ø | | | | | | | |
| 10 | - | 5 | - | 0 | | (Estonia) | **Baruto** | O | | (Mongolia) | **Harumafuji** | 11 | - | 4 | - | 0 |
| 9 | - | 6 | - | 0 | | (Japan) | **Kisenosato** | O | | (Bulgaria) | **Kotoōshū** | 8 | - | 7 | - | 0 |
| | | | | | ø | | | O | | (Japan) | **Kotoshōgiku** | 9 | - | 6 | | 0 |
| 13 | - | 2 | - | 0 | | (Mongolia) | **Kakuryū** | S | | (Japan) | Aminishiki | 7 | - | 8 | - | 0 |
| 6 | - | 9 | - | 0 | | (Georgia (country)) | Gagamaru | K | | (Japan) | Tochiōzan | 5 | - | 10 | - | 0 |
| 7 | - | 8 | - | 0 | | (Japan) | Myōgiryū | M1 | | (South Korea) | Tochinowaka | 5 | - | 10 | - | 0 |
| 3 | - | 12 | - | 0 | | (Mongolia) | Tokitenkū | M2 | ø | (Japan) | Yoshikaze | 3 | - | 10 | - | 2 |
| 5 | - | 10 | - | 0 | | (Mongolia) | Kyokutenhō | M3 | | (Georgia (country)) | Tochinoshin | 5 | - | 10 | - | 0 |
| 11 | - | 4 | - | 0 | | (Japan) | **Toyonoshima** | M4 | | (Russia) | **Aran** | 9 | - | 6 | - | 0 |
| 7 | - | 8 | - | 0 | | (Japan) | Wakakōyū | M5 | | (Japan) | **Hōmashō** | 11 | - | 4 | - | 0 |
| 7 | - | 8 | - | 0 | | (Japan) | Shōhōzan | M6 | | (Japan) | **Gōeidō** | 12 | - | 3 | - | 0 |
| 10 | - | 5 | - | 0 | | (Japan) | **Takayasu** | M7 | | (Japan) | **Toyohibiki** | 9 | - | 6 | - | 0 |
| 3 | - | 10 | - | 2 | ø | (Japan) | Chiyonokuni | M8 | | (Japan) | **Takekaze** | 9 | - | 6 | - | 0 |
| 8 | - | 7 | - | 0 | | (Japan) | **Okinoumi** | M9 | | (Japan) | **Miyabiyama** | 8 | - | 7 | - | 0 |
| 6 | - | 9 | - | 0 | | (Japan) | Sadanofuji | M10 | | (Bulgaria) | **Aoiyama** | 8 | - | 7 | - | 0 |
| 5 | - | 10 | - | 0 | | (Mongolia) | Asasekiryū | M11 | | (Japan) | Tenkaihō | 6 | - | 9 | - | 0 |
| 7 | - | 8 | - | 0 | | (Japan) | Daidō | M12 | | (Japan) | Fujiazuma | 5 | - | 10 | - | 0 |
| 9 | - | 6 | - | 0 | | (Japan) | **Kitataiki** | M13 | | (Japan) | **Wakanosato** | 8 | - | 7 | - | 0 |
| 6 | - | 9 | - | 0 | | (Japan) | Takarafuji | M14 | | (Japan) | Ikioi | 5 | - | 10 | - | 0 |
| 7 | - | 8 | - | 0 | | (Mongolia) | Tamawashi | M15 | | (Japan) | Hōchiyama | 4 | - | 11 | - | 0 |
| 9 | - | 6 | - | 0 | | (Mongolia) | **Shōtenrō** | M16 | | (Czech Republic) | Takanoyama | 4 | - | 11 | - | 0 |

ø - Indicates a pull-out or absent rank
**winning record in bold**
**Yusho Winner**
***Won Playoff**

=== Natsu basho ===
Ryōgoku Kokugikan, Tokyo, 6 – 20 May

2012 Natsu basho results - Makuuchi Division
| W | | L | | A | East | | Rank | West | | | W | | L | | A |
|---|---|---|---|---|---|---|---|---|---|---|---|---|---|---|---|
| 10 | - | 5 | - | 0 | (Mongolia) | **Hakuhō** | Y | ø | | | | | | | |
| 8 | - | 7 | - | 0 | (Mongolia) | **Harumafuji** | O | | (Estonia) | **Baruto** | 9 | - | 6 | - | 0 |
| 11 | - | 4 | - | 0 | (Japan) | **Kisenosato** | O | | (Japan) | **Kotoshōgiku** | 10 | - | 5 | - | 0 |
| 8 | - | 7 | - | 0 | (Bulgaria) | **Kotoōshū** | O | | (Mongolia) | **Kakuryū** | 8 | - | 7 | | 0 |
| 7 | - | 8 | - | 0 | (Japan) | Toyonoshima | S | | (Japan) | **Gōeidō** | 8 | - | 7 | - | 0 |
| 4 | - | 11 | - | 0 | (Japan) | Hōmashō | K | | (Japan) | Aminishiki | 7 | - | 8 | - | 0 |
| 5 | - | 10 | - | 0 | (Russia) | Aran | M1 | | (Japan) | Takayasu | 5 | - | 10 | - | 0 |
| 9 | - | 6 | - | 0 | (Japan) | **Myōgiryū** | M2 | | (Georgia (country)) | Gagamaru | 5 | - | 10 | - | 0 |
| 5 | - | 10 | - | 0 | (Japan) | Toyohibiki | M3 | | (Japan) | Takekaze | 7 | - | 8 | - | 0 |
| 12 | - | 3 | - | 0 | (Japan) | **Tochiōzan** | M4 | | (South Korea) | Tochinowaka | 2 | - | 13 | - | 0 |
| 10 | - | 5 | - | 0 | (Japan) | **Okinoumi** | M5 | | (Japan) | Miyabiyama | 4 | - | 11 | - | 0 |
| 10 | - | 5 | - | 0 | (Japan) | **Wakakōyū** | M6 | | (Bulgaria) | **Aoiyama** | 11 | - | 4 | - | 0 |
| 9 | - | 6 | - | 0 | (Japan) | **Shōhōzan** | M7 | | (Mongolia) | **Kyokutenhō*** | 12 | - | 3 | - | 0 |
| 9 | - | 6 | - | 0 | (Georgia (country)) | **Tochinoshin** | M8 | | (Japan) | Kitataiki | 5 | - | 10 | - | 0 |
| 7 | - | 8 | - | 0 | (Mongolia) | Tokitenkū | M9 | | (Japan) | **Yoshikaze** | 8 | - | 7 | - | 0 |
| 5 | - | 10 | - | 0 | (Japan) | Wakanosato | M10 | ø | (Japan) | Chiyotairyū | 5 | - | 4 | - | 6 |
| 9 | - | 6 | - | 0 | (Mongolia) | **Shōtenrō** | M11 | | (Japan) | Sadanofuji | 7 | - | 8 | - | 0 |
| 9 | - | 6 | - | 0 | (Brazil) | **Kaisei** | M12 | | (Japan) | Daidō | 7 | - | 8 | - | 0 |
| 5 | - | 10 | - | 0 | (Japan) | Tenkaihō | M13 | ø | (Japan) | Kimikaze | 5 | - | 8 | - | 2 |
| 6 | - | 9 | - | 0 | (Mongolia) | Asasekiryū | M14 | ø | (Japan) | Chiyonokuni | 0 | - | 0 | - | 15 |
| 3 | - | 12 | - | 0 | (Japan) | Fujiazuma | M15 | | (Mongolia) | **Tamawashi** | 8 | - | 7 | - | 0 |
| 9 | - | 6 | - | 0 | (Japan) | **Takarafuji** | M16 | ø | | | | | | | |

ø - Indicates a pull-out or absent rank
**winning record in bold**
**Yusho Winner**
***Won Playoff**

=== Nagoya basho ===
Aichi Prefectural Gymnasium, Nagoya, 8 – 22 July

2012 Nagoya basho results - Makuuchi Division
| W | | L | | A | East | | | Rank | West | | | W | | L | | A |
|---|---|---|---|---|---|---|---|---|---|---|---|---|---|---|---|---|
| 14 | - | 1 | - | 0 | | (Mongolia) | **Hakuhō** | Y | ø | | | | | | | |
| 10 | - | 5 | - | 0 | | (Japan) | **Kisenosato** | O | | (Japan) | **Kotoshōgiku** | 10 | - | 5 | - | 0 |
| 9 | - | 6 | - | 0 | | (Estonia) | **Baruto** | O | | (Mongolia) | **Harumafuji** | 15 | - | 0 | - | 0 |
| 9 | - | 6 | - | 0 | | (Bulgaria) | **Kotoōshū** | O | | (Mongolia) | **Kakuryū** | 9 | - | 6 | | 0 |
| 7 | - | 7 | - | 1 | ø | (Japan) | Gōeidō | S | | (Japan) | Tochiōzan | 4 | - | 11 | - | 0 |
| 8 | - | 7 | - | 0 | | (Japan) | **Myōgiryū** | K | | (Japan) | Toyonoshima | 5 | - | 10 | - | 0 |
| 2 | - | 13 | - | 0 | | (Mongolia) | Kyokutenhō | M1 | | (Japan) | Aminishiki | 6 | - | 9 | - | 0 |
| 8 | - | 7 | - | 0 | | (Bulgaria) | **Aoiyama** | M2 | | (Japan) | Okinoumi | 4 | - | 11 | - | 0 |
| 3 | - | 12 | - | 0 | | (Japan) | Wakakōyū | M3 | | (Japan) | **Shōhōzan** | 8 | - | 7 | - | 0 |
| 9 | - | 6 | - | 0 | | (Georgia (country)) | **Tochinoshin** | M4 | | (Japan) | Takekaze | 7 | - | 8 | - | 0 |
| 9 | - | 6 | - | 0 | | (Russia) | **Aran** | M5 | | (Japan) | Takayasu | 6 | - | 9 | - | 0 |
| 9 | - | 6 | - | 0 | | (Japan) | **Hōmashō** | M6 | | (Mongolia) | Shōtenrō | 7 | - | 8 | - | 0 |
| 10 | - | 5 | - | 0 | | (Georgia (country)) | **Gagamaru** | M7 | | (Japan) | **Toyohibiki** | 9 | - | 6 | - | 0 |
| 7 | - | 8 | - | 0 | | (Japan) | Yoshikaze | M8 | | (Brazil) | **Kaisei** | 11 | - | 4 | - | 0 |
| 8 | - | 7 | - | 0 | | (Japan) | **Miyabiyama** | M9 | | (Mongolia) | **Tokitenkū** | 9 | - | 6 | - | 0 |
| 2 | - | 13 | - | 0 | | (Japan) | Tamaasuka | M10 | | (Japan) | Takarafuji | 6 | - | 9 | - | 0 |
| 4 | - | 11 | - | 0 | | (Mongolia) | Tamawashi | M11 | | (Japan) | **Kitataiki** | 9 | - | 6 | - | 0 |
| 5 | - | 10 | - | 0 | | (Japan) | Sadanofuji | M12 | | (Czech Republic) | Takanoyama | 5 | - | 10 | - | 0 |
| 10 | - | 5 | - | 0 | | (Japan) | **Daidō** | M13 | | (Japan) | **Masunoyama** | 11 | - | 4 | - | 0 |
| 5 | - | 10 | - | 0 | | (South Korea) | Tochinowaka | M14 | | (Japan) | **Wakanosato** | 8 | - | 7 | - | 0 |
| 1 | - | 14 | - | 0 | | (Japan) | Hōchiyama | M15 | | (Japan) | **Chiyotairyū** | 8 | - | 7 | - | 0 |
| 7 | - | 8 | - | 0 | | (Japan) | Ikioi | M16 | ø | | | | | | | |

ø - Indicates a pull-out or absent rank
**winning record in bold**
**Yusho Winner**

=== Aki basho ===
Ryōgoku Kokugikan, Tokyo, 9 – 23 September

2012 Aki basho results - Makuuchi Division
| W | | L | | A | East | | | Rank | West | | | W | | L | | A |
|---|---|---|---|---|---|---|---|---|---|---|---|---|---|---|---|---|
| 13 | - | 2 | - | 0 | | (Mongolia) | **Hakuhō** | Y | ø | | | | | | | |
| 15 | - | 0 | - | 0 | | (Mongolia) | **Harumafuji** | O | | (Japan) | **Kisenosato** | 10 | - | 5 | - | 0 |
| 2 | - | 2 | - | 11 | ø | (Japan) | Kotoshōgiku | O | ø | (Estonia) | Baruto | 1 | - | 3 | - | 11 |
| 2 | - | 4 | - | 9 | ø | (Bulgaria) | Kotoōshū | O | | (Mongolia) | **Kakuryū** | 11 | - | 4 | | 0 |
| 10 | - | 5 | - | 0 | | (Japan) | **Myōgiryū** | S | | (Japan) | **Gōeidō** | 8 | - | 7 | - | 0 |
| 4 | - | 11 | - | 0 | | (Bulgaria) | Aoiyama | K | | (Georgia (country)) | Tochinoshin | 6 | - | 9 | - | 0 |
| 7 | - | 8 | - | 0 | | (Japan) | Shōhōzan | M1 | | (Brazil) | Kaisei | 7 | - | 8 | - | 0 |
| 3 | - | 12 | - | 0 | | (Russia) | Aran | M2 | | (Georgia (country)) | Gagamaru | 4 | - | 11 | - | 0 |
| 9 | - | 6 | - | 0 | | (Japan) | **Hōmashō** | M3 | | (Japan) | Toyonoshima | 6 | - | 9 | - | 0 |
| 10 | - | 5 | - | 0 | | (Japan) | **Aminishiki** | M4 | | (Japan) | Toyohibiki | 7 | - | 8 | - | 0 |
| 9 | - | 6 | - | 0 | | (Japan) | **Tochiōzan** | M5 | | (Japan) | **Takekaze** | 8 | - | 7 | - | 0 |
| 6 | - | 9 | - | 0 | | (Mongolia) | Tokitenkū | M6 | | (Japan) | **Masunoyama** | 8 | - | 7 | - | 0 |
| 5 | - | 10 | - | 0 | | (Japan) | Miyabiyama | M7 | | (Mongolia) | Shōtenrō | 6 | - | 9 | - | 0 |
| 7 | - | 8 | - | 0 | | (Japan) | Daidō | M8 | | (Japan) | **Okinoumi** | 11 | - | 4 | - | 0 |
| 6 | - | 9 | - | 0 | | (Japan) | Kitataiki | M9 | | (Japan) | **Takayasu** | 10 | - | 5 | - | 0 |
| 7 | - | 8 | - | 0 | | (Japan) | Yoshikaze | M10 | | (Japan) | Wakakōyū | 6 | - | 9 | - | 0 |
| 10 | - | 5 | - | 0 | | (Mongolia) | **Kyokutenhō** | M11 | | (Japan) | Wakanosato | 7 | - | 8 | - | 0 |
| 6 | - | 9 | - | 0 | | (Japan) | Chiyotairyū | M12 | | (Japan) | Takarafuji | 5 | - | 10 | - | 0 |
| 8 | - | 7 | - | 0 | | (Mongolia) | **Asasekiryū** | M13 | | (Japan) | Tenkaihō | 6 | - | 9 | - | 0 |
| 8 | - | 7 | - | 0 | | (Japan) | **Asahishō** | M14 | | (Japan) | Kimurayama | 6 | - | 9 | - | 0 |
| 8 | - | 7 | - | 0 | | (Japan) | **Fujiazuma** | M15 | | (Japan) | Sadanofuji | 5 | - | 10 | - | 0 |
| 6 | - | 9 | - | 0 | | (Czech Republic) | Takanoyama | M16 | ø | | | | | | | |

ø - Indicates a pull-out or absent rank
**winning record in bold**
**Yusho Winner**

=== Kyushu basho ===
Fukuoka Kokusai Center, Kyushu, 11 – 25 November

2012 Kyushu basho results - Makuuchi Division
| W | | L | | A | East | | | Rank | West | | | W | | L | | A |
|---|---|---|---|---|---|---|---|---|---|---|---|---|---|---|---|---|
| 14 | - | 1 | - | 0 | | (Mongolia) | **Hakuhō** | Y | | (Mongolia) | **Harumafuji** | 9 | - | 6 | - | 0 |
| 9 | - | 6 | - | 0 | | (Mongolia) | **Kakuryū** | O | | (Japan) | **Kisenosato** | 10 | - | 5 | - | 0 |
| 8 | - | 7 | - | 0 | | (Japan) | Kotoshōgiku | O | | (Bulgaria) | **Kotoōshū** | 9 | - | 6 | - | 0 |
| 1 | - | 2 | - | 12 | ø | (Estonia) | Baruto | O | ø | | | | | | | |
| 6 | - | 9 | - | 0 | | (Japan) | Myōgiryū | S | | (Japan) | **Gōeidō** | 11 | - | 4 | - | 0 |
| 7 | - | 8 | - | 0 | | (Japan) | Aminishiki | K | | (Japan) | Hōmashō | 4 | - | 11 | - | 0 |
| 2 | - | 8 | - | 5 | ø | (Japan) | Okinoumi | M1 | | (Japan) | **Tochiōzan** | 10 | - | 5 | - | 0 |
| 10 | - | 5 | - | 0 | | (Japan) | **Shōhōzan** | M2 | | (Brazil) | Kaisei | 7 | - | 8 | - | 0 |
| 5 | - | 10 | - | 0 | | (Georgia (country)) | Tochinoshin | M3 | | (Japan) | Takekaze | 4 | - | 11 | - | 0 |
| 5 | - | 10 | - | 0 | | (Japan) | Takayasu | M4 | | (Japan) | Masunoyama | 5 | - | 10 | - | 0 |
| 6 | - | 3 | - | 6 | ø | (Bulgaria) | Aoiyama | M5 | | (Japan) | **Toyohibiki** | 9 | - | 6 | - | 0 |
| 10 | - | 5 | - | 0 | | (Mongolia) | **Kyokutenhō** | M6 | | (Japan) | **Toyonoshima** | 11 | - | 4 | - | 0 |
| 8 | - | 7 | - | 0 | | (Georgia (country)) | **Gagamaru** | M7 | | (Russia) | **Aran** | 8 | - | 7 | - | 0 |
| 7 | - | 8 | - | 0 | | (Mongolia) | Tokitenkū | M8 | | (Japan) | Daidō | 5 | - | 10 | - | 0 |
| 5 | - | 10 | - | 0 | | (Mongolia) | Shōtenrō | M9 | ø | (Mongolia) | Asasekiryū | 0 | - | 3 | - | 12 |
| 9 | - | 6 | - | 0 | | (Japan) | **Ikioi** | M10 | | (Japan) | **Yoshikaze** | 8 | - | 7 | - | 0 |
| 6 | - | 9 | - | 0 | | (Japan) | Asahishō | M11 | | (Japan) | Miyabiyama | 5 | - | 10 | - | 0 |
| 8 | - | 7 | - | 0 | | (Japan) | **Kitataiki** | M12 | | (Japan) | **Wakanosato** | 8 | - | 7 | - | 0 |
| 8 | - | 7 | - | 0 | | (Japan) | **Fujiazuma** | M13 | | (Japan) | Wakakōyū | 4 | - | 11 | - | 0 |
| 6 | - | 9 | - | 0 | | (Japan) | Jōkōryū | M14 | | (Japan) | Chiyonokuni | 5 | - | 10 | - | 0 |
| 3 | - | 12 | - | 0 | | (Japan) | Yoshiazuma | M15 | | (Japan) | **Chiyotairyū** | 10 | - | 5 | - | 0 |
| 9 | - | 6 | - | 0 | | (Mongolia) | **Tamawashi** | M16 | ø | | | | | | | |

ø - Indicates a pull-out or absent rank
**winning record in bold**
**Yusho Winner**

== News ==
=== January ===
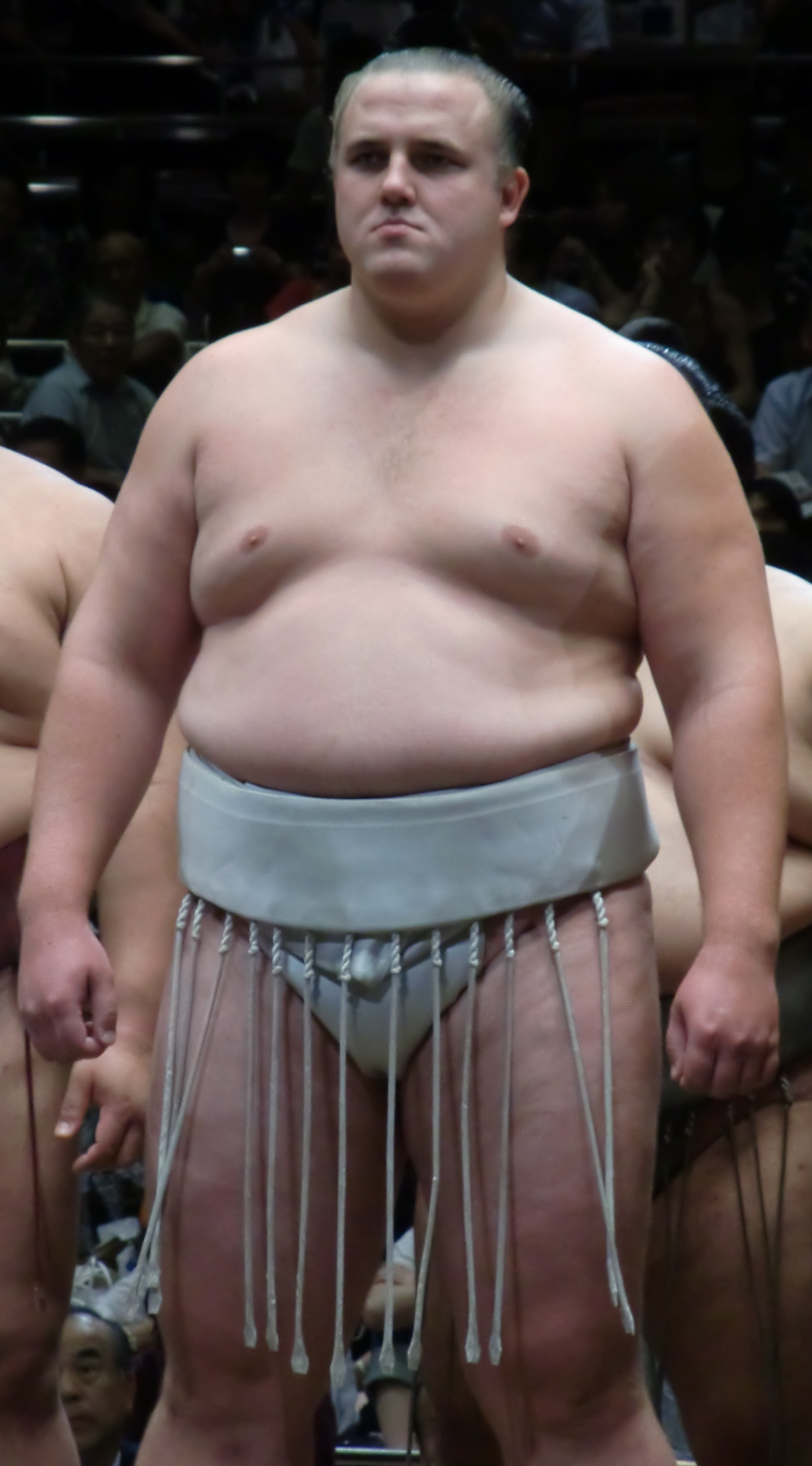
Baruto won his first championship in January

- 6: Yokozuna Hakuho performs the dohyo-iri ceremony at the Meiji Shrine in front of hundreds of sumo fans to mark the New Year.
- 8: A CD of a song performed by a group of ten sumo coaches calling themselves the "Oyakata All-Stars" and also featuring the Sumo Association's official mascot goes on sale at the Kokugikan.
- 11: On the fourth day of the Hatsu basho a gyōji, the 10th Kimura Shōzaburō, is knocked out of the dohyo during a bout between Baruto and Wakakoyu, hitting his head and losing consciousness. He is taken away on a stretcher and is later revealed to have suffered a concussion.
- 20: Ozeki Baruto wins his first top division yusho or championship with two days to spare, moving to an unassailable 13–0 lead whilst Hakuho suffers his third defeat of the tournament to Kotooshu.
- 20: Sakumayama is handed the first defeat of his professional career in the makushita division by Sensho, ending a record run of 27 consecutive victories since his debut.
- 22: On the final day, Hakuho defeats Baruto to finish on 12–3, two wins behind the Estonian. Georgian Gagamaru also finishes a runner-up on 12–3 and receives his second Fighting Spirit prize. The Technique prize goes to Myogiryu, whilst Kakuryu gets the Outstanding Performance award for handing Hakuho his first defeat on Day 10. The jūryō championship is won by Chiyotairyu in his first tournament in the division. The makushita yusho is won by Sakumayama at his first attempt in a series of playoffs after eight men finish on 6–1.
- 22: Former sekiwake Tochinonada retires and becomes Takenawa Oyakata.
- 28: The danpatsu-shiki or official retirement ceremony of Sekinoto Oyakata, the former komusubi Iwakiyama who retired in September 2010, is held at the Kokugikan.
- 31: In the Japan Sumo Association's board elections, Kitanoumi returns as chairman, replacing Hanaregoma who is stepping down as he will reach the mandatory retirement age of 65 next year. Kitanoumi, who previously served as the JSA head from 2002 until 2008, is the first man to hold the post more than once.

=== February ===
- 5: Hakuho wins the 36th Ozumo one day knock out competition at the Kokugikan, defeating Goeido in the final and winning the ¥2.5 million prize. Goeido had defeated him in the last tournament held in 2010.
- 13: Tagonoura Oyakata (former maegashira Kushimaumi), head of Tagonoura stable, dies suddenly at the age of 46.
- 17–18: A special exhibition tournament is held in Bangkok, Thailand at the CentralWorld shopping complex, to celebrate the 84th birthday of King Bhumibol Adulyadej. It is the first time sumo has come to the country.
- 27: The banzuke for the first Osaka tournament since March 2010 is released. Gagamaru makes his san'yaku debut at komusubi, and Ikioi of Isenoumi stable reaches the makuuchi division. Newcomers to jūryō are Chiyootori, the fifth jūryō debut from Kokonoe stable in the last five tournaments, and Sensho, the first wrestler from the former Oshio's Shikihide stable to reach sekitori level since it opened in 1992.
- 29: Former maegashira Hamanishiki retires. He becomes the head of the Kasugayama stable, with the former Kasugafuji, now on the Sumo Association's board of directors, moving to the Ikazuchi name.

=== March ===
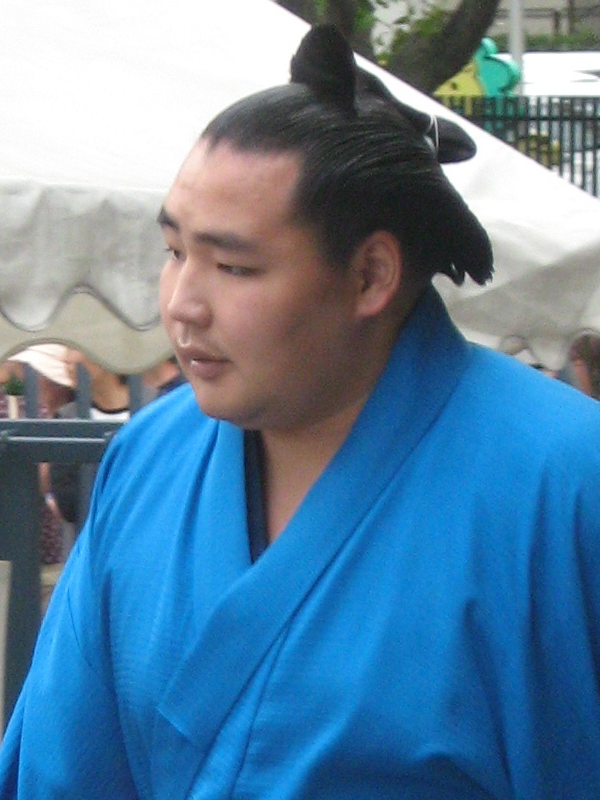
Kakuryu became sumo's sixth ozeki in March 2012

- 18: The Sumo Association agree to allow the re–establishment of Kise stable, run by former maegashira Higonoumi, as of April 1. He was forced to merge his stable with Kitanoumi stable in 2010 after he was caught selling basho tickets to yazuka members. All the ex−Kise wrestlers as well as rising star Sakumayama will move to the new stable.
- 25: Sekiwake Kakuryu comes into the final day of the Osaka tournament on 13–1, one win ahead of Hakuho on 12–2, but he loses to Goeido while Hakuho beats Baruto to set up a playoff. Hakuho gains revenge on Kakuryu who beat him on Day 9, and claims his 22nd yusho, drawing him level with Takanohana in fifth placed all–time. Kakuryu receives awards for Outstanding performance and Technique, and is guaranteed promotion to ozeki having won 33 bouts in three tournaments. Toyonoshima, who scored 11–4, shares the Technique prize while the Fighting Spirit Award goes to Goeido who won 12 bouts. The jūryō division championship is won by Kimikaze.
- 28: The Sumo Association announce four promotions to jūryō – newcomers Sakumayama (later known as Jokoryu) and Kitazono (later Masakaze) and returnees Tokushoryu and Homarefuji. All four are ex–collegiate wrestlers. Kakuryu's promotion to ozeki is also officially confirmed. It is the first time in sumo history that there are six active ozeki at the same time.

=== April ===
The spring tour visits the following locations:

  - 1: Ise Shrine, Mie Prefecture
  - 2: Katsuragi, Nara Prefecture
  - 3–4: Obama, Fukui Prefecture
  - 6: Yasukuni Shrine, Kudan, Chiyoda, Tokyo
  - 7: Fujisawa, Kanagawa Prefecture
  - 8: Sano, Tochigi Prefecture
- 23: The banzuke for the May tournament is released. With Kakuryu's promotion there are six ozeki for the first time in sumo history. There are two newcomers to the top division: Kokonoe stable's Chiyotairyu, formerly of Nihon Taiiku University, and Oguruma stable's Kimikaze, only the second Waseda University graduate to make makuuchi.
- 25: Oshima Oyakata, the former ozeki Asahikuni, turns 65 and retires. As a result, Oshima stable closes, with its wrestlers moving to Tomozuna stable.

=== May ===
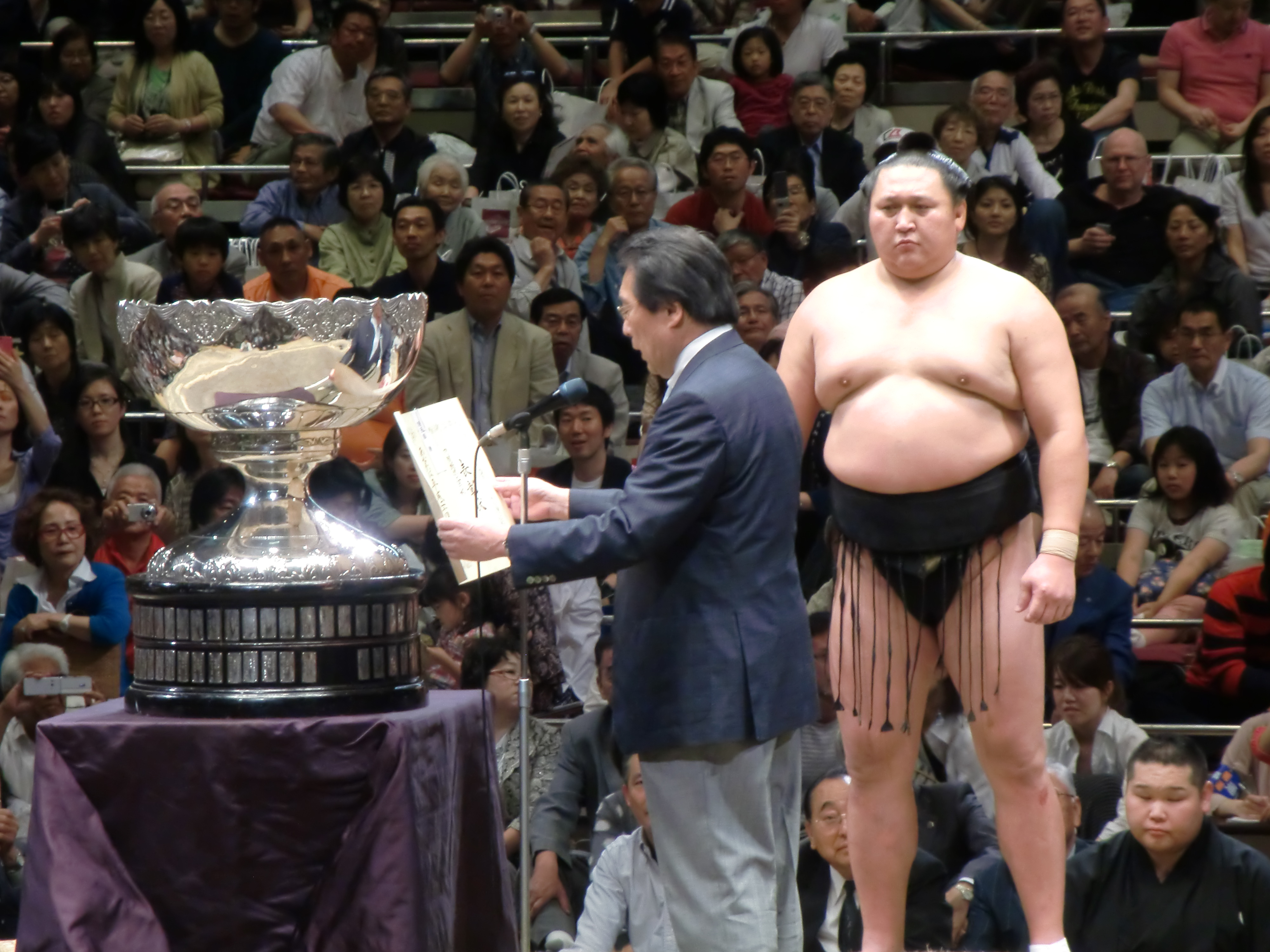
Kyokutenho was the surprise winner of the May 2012 tournament

- 20: For the first time in 62 basho (since Kotomitsuki's victory in September 2001) the yusho is not won by a yokozuna or an ozeki. The final day of the Natsu basho sees three co–leaders on 11–3, maegashira Kyokutenho and Tochiozan, and ozeki Kisenosato. Kyokutenho beats Goeido and Tochiozan gets a default win over the withdrawing Kotooshu, but Kisenosato, who led by two wins earlier in the tournament, is defeated by fellow ozeki Baruto and is out of contention. Kyokutenho then defeats Tochiozan in a playoff – the first ever between two maegashira – and at 37 years and 8 months becomes the oldest ever first–time yusho winner, and second oldest yusho winner ever (behind only Tachiyama in 1916). Kyokutenho had originally been due to retire and take over Oshima stable before this tournament, but decided to continue wrestling. He receives his sixth Fighting Spirit Award, shared with Tochiozan, while Goeido gets his first Outstanding performance Award for defeating Hakuho on Day 8. The Technique Award is won for the second time by Myogiryu. In the jūryō division Tamaasuka wins his second yusho. This tournament also sees former komusubi Kakizoe and former maegashira Tsurugidake announce their retirements.
- 20: The Hanakago stable closes, with its wrestlers and stablemaster, former sekiwake Daijuyama, moving to Minezaki stable.
- 22: The Sumo Association announce two promotions to jūryō. Mongolian Takanoiwa becomes Takanohana's first sekitori since he took over his stable in 2004, and fellow Mongolian Oniarashi of Asahiyama stable finally reaches jūryō after 71 tournaments, the slowest rise ever by a foreign recruit.
- 27: The retirement ceremony of former ozeki Kaio, who ended his career in July 2011, takes place at the Kokugikan, with around 10000 spectators.

=== June ===
- 25: The banzuke for the July tournament is released. Myogiryu makes his san'yaku debut at komusubi, and despite his victory in the last tournament Kyokutenho remains in the magashira ranks – the first time a magashira yusho winner has not been promoted to san'yaku since Sadanoyama in 1961.

=== July ===
- 22: The final day of the Nagoya basho sees a showdown for the title between two wrestlers with identical 14–0 records – the first time this has occurred since 1983. Ozeki Harumafuji defeats Hakuho to win his third yusho with a perfect record. He will be under consideration for yokozuna promotion in September, despite only scoring 8–7 in May. For the first time since 2008, Hakuho goes two consecutive tournaments without winning the title. Myogiryu wins his third Technique prize, while the Fighting Spirit Award is shared between Brazilian Kaisei and Masunoyama in just his second makuuchi tournament. The jūryō championship is won by Chiyonokuni, a great comeback after missing some or all of his last three tournaments. The retirement of former juryo and Nippon Sport Science University competitor Chiyozakura is confirmed. He had missed the previous three tournaments due to a cervical spine injury suffered the previous year. His career was so brief that despite reaching sekitori status he never had the chance to have his hair put in the oichomage style, the first since Oyamato in 1994.

=== August ===
- 27: The banzuke for the forthcoming Aki basho is released. Myogiryu makes his sekiwake debut, and Aoiyama his komusubi debut. Asahishō is promoted to makuuchi. New sekitori are Keitenkai, and college champions Daikiho and Tanzo.

=== September ===
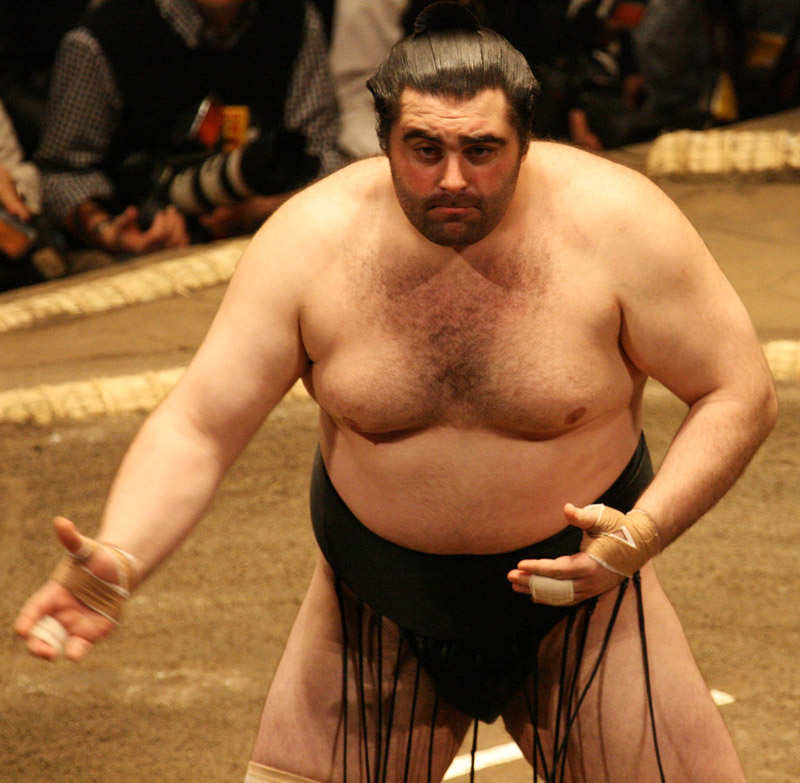
Kokkai announced his retirement in September.

- 20: Ikazuchi Oyakata, the former Kasugafuji, resigns from the Japan Sumo Association after a tabloid magazine claims that he submitted bogus expenses to cover up an affair he was having with a Sumo Association employee.
- 23: At the Aki basho in Tokyo, Harumafuji defeats Hakuho in an epic bout to seal his second consecutive championship with another perfect 15–0 record, and is virtually guaranteed to become sumo′s 70th Yokozuna. Hakuho, who gave up a kinboshi to Tochiozan earlier in the tournament, has to settle for runner-up honours once again and has only one yusho for the year. Three ozeki, Kotooshu, Kotoshogiku and Baruto, pull out of the tournament through injury and will be kadoban in November. Sekiwake Myogiryu scores 10–5 and wins his fourth Technique prize in five tournaments. Tochiozan gets the Outstanding Performance award for his win over Hakuho. There is no Fighting Spirit prize awarded, although Kyokutenho, who won his first nine bouts, would have received it had he won on the final day. The jūryō championship is won by Jokoryu, who secures promotion to the top division after just nine tournaments as a pro – the fastest rise since the introduction of six tournaments a year in 1958. Georgian Kokkai, the first European to reach the top division in 2004, announces his retirement due to persistent injuries.
- 26: The Sumo Association announces that Harumafuji has been promoted to the 70th Yokozuna, making him the fifth foreigner to make the rank. Harumafuji says becoming a yokozuna, "was a dream that was distant, very distant. I think I have been very fortunate."
- 28: Harumafuji makes his first public appearance as a yokozuna, performing the dohyo-iri in the Shiranui style at the Meiji Shrine.
- 29: At the retirement ceremony or danpatsu-shiki of former sekiwake Tochinonada, Harumafuji performs the dohyo–iri in the Kokugikan for the first time.

=== October ===
- 1: Harumafuji wins the first day of the All Japan sumo tournament, defeating Kisenosato in the final. It is his fourth one-day title, matching the record held by Futabayama and Akebono.

The autumn tour visits the following locations:

- 6: Nagano, Nagano Prefecture
- 7: Fujioka, Gunma Prefecture
- 13: Saitama, Saitama Prefecture
- 14: Yokohama, Kanagawa Prefecture
- 20: Uozu, Toyama Prefecture
- 21: Hamamatsu, Shizuoka Prefecture
- 22: Tokushima, Tokushima Prefecture
- 23: Shodoshima, Kagawa Prefecture
- 25: Kurashiki, Okayama Prefecture
- 26: Seiyo, Ehime Prefecture
- 27: Hiroshima, Hiroshima Prefecture
- 28: Ube, Yamaguchi Prefecture
- 29: The banzuke for the forthcoming Kyūshū basho is released. Harumafuji is listed as West Yokozuna; Aminishiki and Hōmashō return to komusubi rank, with Aoiyama losing the rank; Jōkōryū is the sole debutant in the Makuuchi division, with Ikioi, Chiyonokuni, Yoshiazuma, and Tamawashi all returning; Ryūden's Jūryō debut is accompanied by the return of Kyokushūhō, Akiseyama, Homarefuji, and Masakaze. In addition, the 10th Kimura Shōzaburō, the gyōji who was knocked out in the January basho, is promoted to become the 39th Shikimori Inosuke.

=== November ===
- 1: The Sumo Association says that it has received an application for just one new recruit for the forthcoming tournament. That means a total for the year of just 56, the lowest since the six tournaments a year system was established in 1958. 34 of those entered at the end of the Japanese school year in March, the lowest since 1973.
- 25: At the Kyushu basho, Hakuho wins just his second championship of the year, but 23rd of his career, and for good measure defeats his fellow yokozuna Harumafuji for the first time since March. Hakuho finishes on 14–1, three wins ahead of sekiwake Goeido, who wins the Technique Award, and rank and filer Toyonoshima. Harumafuji can only score 9–6 and loses his last five bouts, the first debut yokozuna ever to do so. Hakuho′s victory is his sixth straight in Kyushu, and he also ensures that for the sixth year in a row he has the most wins of any rikishi, with 76, although this is well down on the record of 86 he set in 2009 and 2010. There are several withdrawals through injury, including Baruto who loses his ozeki status as a result. Kotooshu and Kotoshogiku however, maintain their ranks with 9–6 and 8–7 respectively. Shōhōzan wins the Fighting Spirit Award for his strong performance at maegashira 2. In the Juryo division, Tochinowaka races to a 13–0 lead but then loses his last two bouts and misses out on the yusho, which goes to Sadanofuji on 14–1.
- 26: After a meeting of the Yokozuna Deliberation Council at the Kokugikan, its chairman Takuhiko Tsuruta criticises Harumafuji′s 9–6 performance as unacceptable, saying "as a yokozuna, you at least have to be able to get double digits wins, or you don't qualify." He even suggests the Council may have erred in recommending Harumafuji for promotion – "His poor performance leaves us with the feeling that we might have promoted him too quickly."

=== December ===
- 24: The banzuke for the forthcoming January tournament is released. Baruto is relegated to sekiwake; Myōgiryū, Aminishiki, and Hōmashō lose san'yaku status, while Tochiōzan and Shōhōzan are promoted to komusubi, and Takarafuji, Tamaasuka, Kotoyūki, Sadanofuji, and Tochinowaka are promoted to makuuchi. Shironoryū's return to jūryō is accompanied by the debuts of Azumaryū and Kagamiō and the relegations of Asasekiryū, Wakakōyū, Jōkōryū, Chiyonokuni, and Yoshiazuma, while Kitaharima, Ryūden, and Masakaze lose sekitori status altogether.

== Deaths ==
- 7 January: Former maegashira 11 Tochimatoi, aged 52, blood poisoning.
- 13 February: Former maegashira 1 Kushimaumi, Tagonoura Oyakata, aged 46, ischemic heart disease.
- 20 March: Former maegashira 8 Daishin, aged 74.
- 20 July: Former jūryō 7 Ichinishiki, also former Tomozuna Oyakata, aged 88.

== See also ==
- Glossary of sumo terms
- List of active sumo wrestlers
- List of years in sumo
- List of yokozuna
