= Kitataiki Akeyoshi =

Japanese sumo wrestler

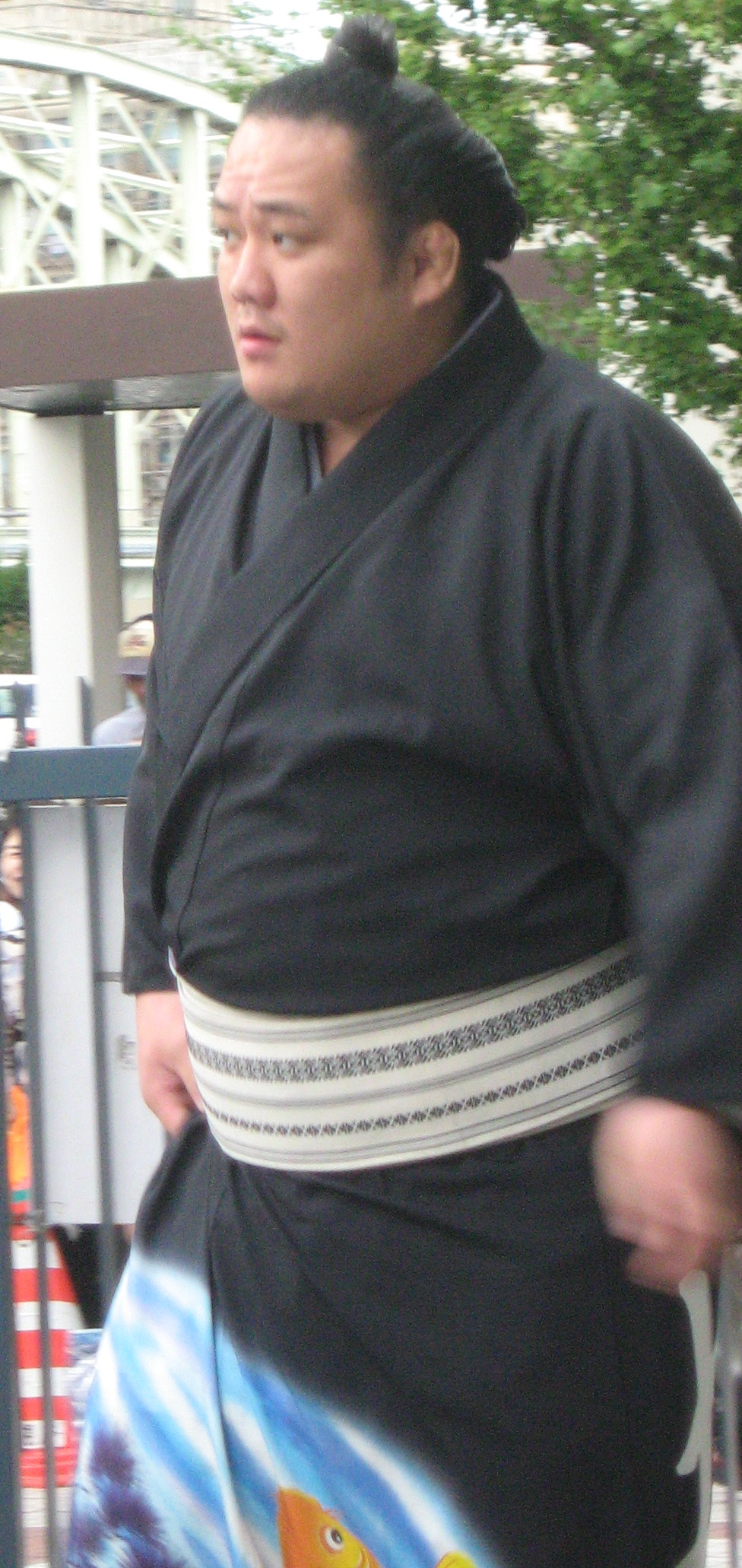

Personal information
- Native name: 北太樹 明義
- Born: Akeyoshi Sanuki; 5 October 1982 (age 44) Machida City, Tokyo, Japan
- Height: 1.85 m (6 ft 1 in)
- Weight: 151 kg (333 lb; 23.8 st)

Sport
- Sport: Sumo
- Retired: January 2018
- Heya: Yamahibiki
- Record: 649-648-2
- Debut: March 1998
- Highest rank: Maegashira 2 (May 2013)
- Elder name: Onogawa
- Championships: 2 (Jūryō)
- Updated on June 25, 2020

Kitataiki Akeyoshi (北太樹 明義, born 5 October 1982) is a Japanese former professional sumo wrestler from Machida City, Tokyo, Japan. Making his debut in March 1998, he reached the top division for the first time in September 2008, returning in January 2010. He won two second division jūryō championships in his career. His highest rank was maegashira 2. He retired in January 2018 and became an elder of the Japan Sumo Association under the name of Onogawa.

== Early life and sumo background ==
As a boy Sanuki participated in swimming, soccer and some judo as an elementary school student. His only experience with sumo during this time was one national children's sumo competition. He went on to play basketball in junior high school. However, starting from his elementary school days he made several visits to the stable of Kitanoumi, who was an acquaintance of his father. Deciding he wanted something different he chose to join Kitanoumi stable, later renamed to Yamahibiki stable after junior high school instead of going on to high school.

== Career ==
He joined Kitanoumi stable and made his professional debut in March 1998. He spent over nine years ranked in the lower divisions, but finally achieved promotion to jūryō in July 2007. He was the first wrestler from his stable in nine years (following Kitazakura) to achieve sekitori status. After a year in jūryō he gained promotion to makuuchi in September 2008 where he lasted two tournaments before being relegated back to jūryō, restricted by a serious injury to his left knee.

Another year in jūryō, ending with his first career yūshō or division championship after a three-way playoff with Kōryū and Tokusegawa, put him back in makuuchi for the second time in January 2010. There he produced his first kachi-koshi in the top division, scoring 9–6 despite aggravating his knee injury. This saw him promoted to maegashira 10 in March and he produced another strong performance with a 10–5 score. For the May 2010 tournament he was in the upper maegashira ranks for the first time at #4. In this tournament he defeated ōzeki Kotomitsuki but failed to secure a winning record; losing his last three matches to finish on 7–8. A 9–6 score in September saw him promoted to a new highest rank of maegashira 3 for the November tournament. He scored only 5–10 in that basho but returned to the maegashira 3 rank for the May 2011 Technical Examination Tournament. There he beat struggling ōzeki Kotoōshū but won only two other matches. He returned to maegashira 3 in January 2012, but was again out of his depth and scored just 2–13.

Kitataiki reached a new highest rank of maegashira 2 in May 2013, scoring 4–11. He generally maintained a consistent enough performance to remain in the mid-level top division ranks, but never won a special prize. January 2015 saw him back in the jūryō division for the first time since 2009. He quickly bounced back and won his second jūryō championship in January 2015 to earn re-promotion to the top division for the March 2015 tournament. However, a succession of losing scores saw him lose top division status again in March 2016 and fall to the bottom of the jūryō division for the September 2016 tournament. He was finally demoted to the makushita division in September 2017 after 61 tournaments as a sekitori.

Having not missed a bout since 2003, at the end of his career Kitataiki had the longest streak of consecutive career matches amongst active wrestlers, with 1082. He overtook the previous holder Yoshiazuma in the July 2017 tournament.

== Retirement from sumo ==
Just before the January 2018 tournament was due to begin, Kitataiki announced his retirement. He has stayed in sumo as an elder of the Japan Sumo Association and works as a coach under the name of Onogawa Oyakata.

== Fighting style ==
Kitataiki was a yotsu-sumo specialist, preferring to grip his opponent's mawashi with a right hand outside, left hand inside position (hidari-yotsu). His most common winning kimarite was yori-kiri or force out, closely followed by oshi-dashi or push out.

== Family ==
His father came up with his current ring name, which he took after two years in sumo. This shikona combines the "kita" of Kitanoumi and "taiki" meaning large tree and symbolizing strength and growth. Kitataiki is married, and the couple have a son born in September 2015.

== Career record ==
Kitataiki Akeyoshi
Year	January Hatsu basho, Tokyo	March Haru basho, Osaka	May Natsu basho, Tokyo	July Nagoya basho, Nagoya	September Aki basho, Tokyo	November Kyūshū basho, Fukuoka
1998	x	(Maezumo)	East Jonokuchi #40; 5–2	West Jonidan #146; 3–4	East Jonokuchi #2; 4–3	West Jonidan #131; 3–4
1999	West Jonidan #144; 5–2	East Jonidan #102; 2–5	West Jonidan #135; 6–1	West Jonidan #53; 2–5	East Jonidan #80; 3–4	East Jonidan #93; 5–2
2000	East Jonidan #52; 1–6	East Jonidan #83; 6–1	West Jonidan #12; 3–4	East Jonidan #31; 5–2	West Sandanme #96; 2–5	East Jonidan #20; 6–1
2001	West Sandanme #58; 2–5	East Sandanme #87; 3–4	East Jonidan #2; 2–5	West Jonidan #25; 6–1	East Sandanme #61; 4–3	East Sandanme #47; 4–3
2002	West Sandanme #31; 4–3	West Sandanme #16; 5–2	West Makushita #57; 3–4	East Sandanme #9; 3–4	East Sandanme #26; 5–2	East Makushita #60; 3–4
2003	West Sandanme #16; 4–3	East Sandanme #7; 6–1	East Makushita #33; 1–4–2	West Sandanme #1; 4–3	West Makushita #49; 3–4	West Sandanme #1; 6–1
2004	East Makushita #26; 4–3	West Makushita #18; 4–3	West Makushita #15; 3–4	West Makushita #19; 3–4	East Makushita #26; 3–4	West Makushita #32; 5–2
2005	East Makushita #23; 3–4	West Makushita #31; 3–4	West Makushita #38; 5–2	West Makushita #22; 5–2	East Makushita #12; 2–5	East Makushita #26; 6–1
2006	West Makushita #9; 3–4	West Makushita #15; 6–1	East Makushita #5; 2–5	East Makushita #15; 4–3	East Makushita #12; 3–4	West Makushita #20; 4–3
2007	East Makushita #16; 5–2	East Makushita #10; 6–1	East Makushita #3; 5–2	East Jūryō #13; 8–7	West Jūryō #10; 9–6	East Jūryō #7; 6–9
2008	East Jūryō #11; 8–7	East Jūryō #10; 11–4	West Jūryō #1; 6–9	East Jūryō #4; 11–4	West Maegashira #13; 7–8	West Maegashira #14; 2–13
2009	West Jūryō #7; 7–8	West Jūryō #9; 10–5	East Jūryō #3; 5–10	West Jūryō #10; 9–6	East Jūryō #4; 7–8	East Jūryō #5; 10–5–PP; Champion
2010	East Maegashira #15; 9–6	East Maegashira #10; 10–5	East Maegashira #4; 7–8	West Maegashira #4; 6–9	East Maegashira #7; 9–6	West Maegashira #3; 5–10
2011	East Maegashira #8; 9–6	Tournament Cancelled; 0–0–0	East Maegashira #3; 3–12	East Maegashira #10; 7–8	East Maegashira #11; 10–5	East Maegashira #5; 8–7
2012	East Maegashira #3; 2–13	East Maegashira #13; 9–6	West Maegashira #8; 5–10	West Maegashira #11; 9–6	East Maegashira #9; 6–9	East Maegashira #12; 8–7
2013	East Maegashira #10; 8–7	West Maegashira #6; 10–5	East Maegashira #2; 4–11	West Maegashira #8; 8–7	East Maegashira #6; 6–9	West Maegashira #9; 8–7
2014	East Maegashira #8; 7–8	East Maegashira #9; 6–9	West Maegashira #13; 9–6	West Maegashira #9; 6–9	West Maegashira #10; 7–8	East Maegashira #12; 3–12
2015	East Jūryō #3; 13–2; Champion	West Maegashira #10; 9–6	East Maegashira #5; 4–11	East Maegashira #10; 5–10	East Maegashira #14; 7–8	East Maegashira #15; 7–8
2016	West Maegashira #15; 7–8	West Maegashira #15; 3–12	West Jūryō #6; 5–10	West Jūryō #12; 6–9	West Jūryō #14; 9–6	East Jūryō #10; 10–5
2017	East Jūryō #5; 4–11	East Jūryō #11; 7–8	West Jūryō #12; 8–7	East Jūryō #12; 5–10	West Makushita #1; 4–3	East Makushita #1; 3–4
2018	East Makushita #3; Retired; 0–1	x	x	x	x	x
Record given as wins–losses–absences Top division champion Top division runner-up Retired Lower divisions Non-participation Sanshō key: F=Fighting spirit; O=Outstanding performance; T=Technique Also shown: ★=Kinboshi; P=Playoff(s); Divisions: Makuuchi — Jūryō — Makushita — Sandanme — Jonidan — Jonokuchi Makuuchi ranks: Yokozuna — Ōzeki — Sekiwake — Komusubi — Maegashira

== See also ==
- List of sumo tournament second division champions
- Glossary of sumo terms
- List of past sumo wrestlers
- List of sumo elders
