= Seirō Takeshi =

Mongolian sumo wrestler

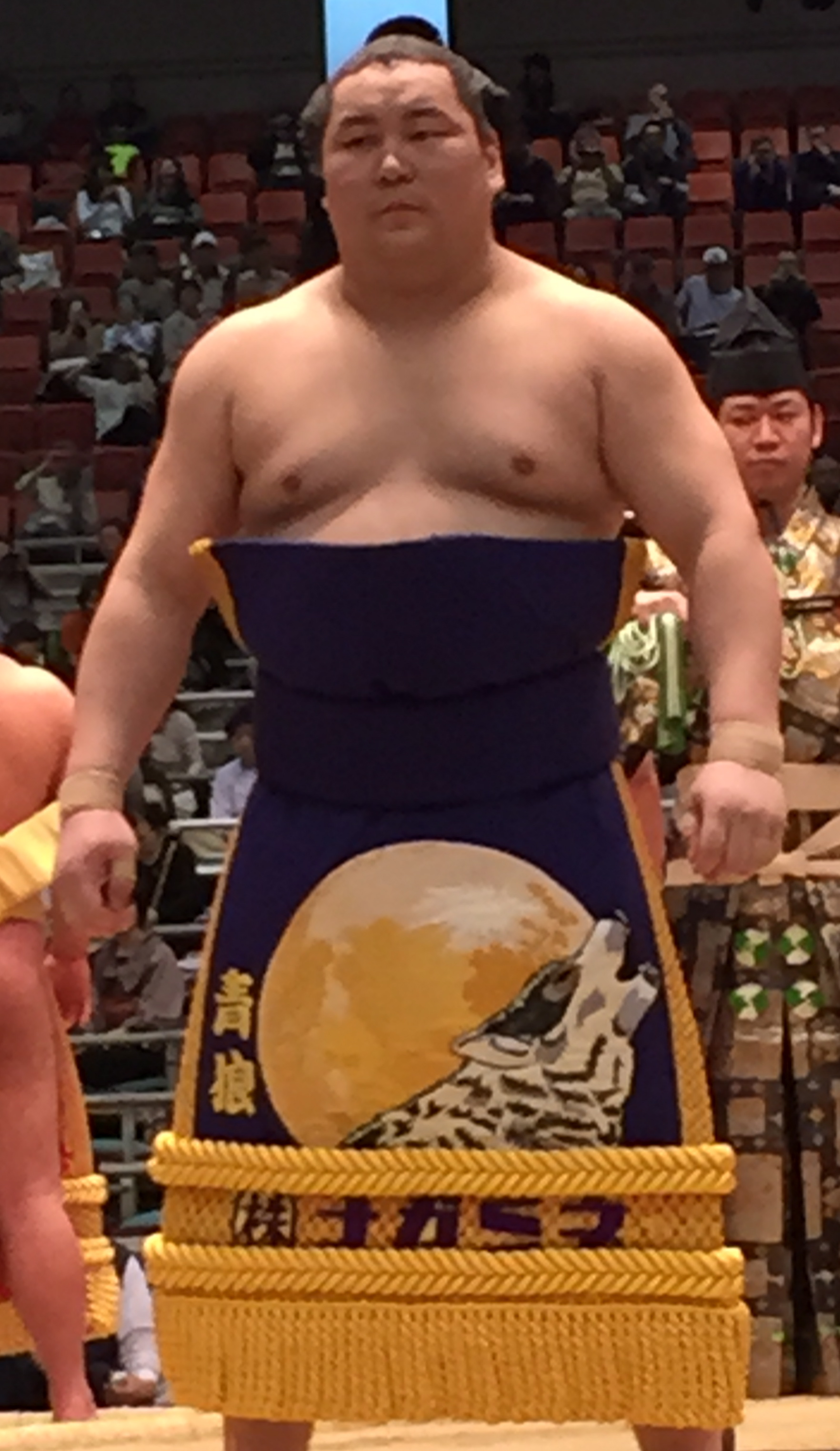
- Seirō in 2015

Personal information
- Native name: 青狼 武士
- Born: Amgaa Unubold; 18 August 1988 (age 38) Ulaanbaatar, Mongolia
- Height: 1.86 m (6 ft 1 in)
- Weight: 146 kg (322 lb)

Sport
- Sport: Sumo
- Retired: July, 2020
- Heya: Shikoroyama stable
- Record: 433-424-25
- Debut: July, 2005
- Highest rank: Maegashira 14 (May, 2016)
- Championships: 1 (Sandanme)
- Updated on 13 July 2020

Seirō Takeshi (Japanese: 青狼 武士; born 18 August 1988 as Amgaa Unubold (Mongolian: Амгаагийн Өнөболд)) is a Mongolian former professional sumo wrestler. He made his professional debut in July 2005. After a decade of competing in the lower ranks of sumo he reached the top division for the first time in 2015. His highest rank was maegashira 14. He wrestled for Shikoroyama stable. He retired in July 2020.

== Early life and sumo background ==
Amgaa Unubold was born on 18 August 1988 in Ulaanbaatar, Mongolian People's Republic. His father was a successful Mongolian wrestler with a rank the equivalent of sekiwake. Then-yokozuna Asashōryū noticed his talent and word got to the head of Shikoroyama stable, the former Terao, who had come scouting to Mongolia. Unubold accepted an invitation to come to Japan to enter sumo and while still a teenager he joined said Shikoroyama stable, taking the ring name (shikona) Seirō, meaning "blue wolf".

== Career ==
Seirō made his debut as a 17-year-old in September 2005 when he won five of his seven bouts in the lowest jonokuchi division and was immediately promoted to jonidan. He competed in jonidan for the next ten tournaments, recording more wins than losses (kachi-koshi) on six occasions before being promoted to the sandanme division for the July tournament in Nagoya in July 2007. After four consecutive kachi-koshi he was promoted to the makushita division in March 2008 but dropped to sandanme after losing four of his seven bouts. In the May tournament of 2009 he was unbeaten in seven contests, taking the championship in that division, securing his second promotion to makushita. Injury problems in early 2010 saw him relegated briefly to sandanme but he returned to makushita for the Nagoya tournament in July. After another three years in the division, Seiro was promoted to jūryō rank in July 2013. In the May 2014, he took part in a four-man playoff for the jūryō championship which would eventually go to Ichinojō. He became the top wrestler in his stable, and the only sekitori, in January 2015 upon the retirement of former komusubi Hōmashō.

In the first three tournaments of 2015, Seirō made kachi-koshi, recording nine wins in January, eight in March and eight in May to earn him promotion to the makuuchi division. In his first appearance in sumo's top division he was ranked maegashira 15 for the Nagoya tournament in July 2015. On his makuuchi debut Seirō won seven of his first thirteen bouts but lost to Yoshikaze and Homarefuji on the last two days to end with a losing record (make-koshi) of 7–8, which nevertheless enabled him to maintain his place in the top division. He again recorded a 7–8 result in September – although he won seven of his twelve matches against makuuchi opposition he lost all three of his contests against jūryō wrestlers. After two losing records he was demoted to jūryō for November and recorded eight wins to maintain a position near the top of the second division. In January he won his first five matches to head the jūryō division, but won only two of his subsequent bouts to end the tournament on 7–8. In March he was more consistent, recording a 9–6 score including a top-division win over Satoyama on the final day to all but ensure his promotion back to makuuchi. Seirō was given a career high ranking of maegashira 14 in May but his second spell in the top division lasted only one tournament. He recorded wins over Gagamaru and Endō but ended with a 5–10 record and was immediately relegated. An 8–7 record in July kept him in contention for promotion but a disappointing performance in September saw him drop to the lower reaches of the second division. He returned to form in November with eleven wins to finish runner-up behind Satō and return to the upper ranks of jūryō. He continued to compete in the second tier throughout 2017, but was never in serious promotion contention.

After an injury in the September 2018 tournament he was demoted to makushita for November, breaking a run of 32 straight tournaments as a sekitori since his jūryō debut. He was promoted back to the jūryō division after the March 2019 tournament. A losing record saw him return to makushita after the May tournament, but he once again earned a promotion to jūryō after the July tournament. However his return to jūryō was short-lived as he withdrew from the September 2019 tournament with only two wins.

== Retirement from sumo ==
Seirō announced his retirement before the July 2020 tournament, citing a number of health problems including meningitis.

Seirō's danpatsu-shiki (retirement ceremony) was held in Tokyo on 20 August 2022.

== Fighting style ==
Seirō favoured a left hand outside, right hand inside (migi-yotsu) grip on his opponent's belt. He employed a wide variety of winning techniques (kimarite) but his most common was yorikiri or force-out which accounted for more than 30% of his wins. He also made frequent use of uwatenage (outer arm throw) and yoritaoshi (front crush-out).

== Personal life ==
On 14 May 2018 Seiro declared that he had been married since December 2016 to a Mongolian woman. Their wedding reception was held on 10 June 2018 with 250 guests in attendance most notable of which being Shikoroyama-oyakata, Hakuhō, and Kakuryū.

== Career record ==
Seirō Takeshi
Year	January Hatsu basho, Tokyo	March Haru basho, Osaka	May Natsu basho, Tokyo	July Nagoya basho, Nagoya	September Aki basho, Tokyo	November Kyūshū basho, Fukuoka
2005	x	x	x	(Maezumō)	East Jonokuchi #41; 5–2	West Jonidan #107; 5–2
2006	West Jonidan #60; 4–3	West Jonidan #35; 3–4	West Jonidan #57; 5–2	East Jonidan #15; 3–4	West Jonidan #37; 3–4	West Jonidan #57; 4–3
2007	East Jonidan #33; 4–3	East Jonidan #7; 3–4	East Jonidan #29; 5–2	West Sandanme #95; 4–3	East Sandanme #78; 6–1	West Sandanme #20; 4–3
2008	East Sandanme #7; 4–3	West Makushita #57; 3–4	West Sandanme #6; 3–4	East Sandanme #19; 3–4	West Sandanme #31; 4–3	West Sandanme #16; 3–4
2009	West Sandanme #34; 0–0–7	West Sandanme #95; 5–2	East Sandanme #62; 7–0; Champion	East Makushita #37; 3–4	East Makushita #45; 3–4	East Makushita #53; 4–3
2010	West Makushita #46; 4–3	East Makushita #40; 0–5–2	West Sandanme #15; 5–2	East Makushita #56; 4–3	West Makushita #46; 5–2	West Makushita #30; 4–3
2011	East Makushita #25; 3–4	Tournament Cancelled; 0–0–0	West Makushita #33; 2–5	West Makushita #37; 5–2	East Makushita #22; 3–4	West Makushita #28; 3–4
2012	East Makushita #36; 5–2	East Makushita #21; 4–3	West Makushita #17; 4–3	West Makushita #13; 4–3	East Makushita #9; 5–2	East Makushita #2; 3–5
2013	West Makushita #6; 4–3	West Makushita #3; 4–3	East Makushita #1; 5–2	East Jūryō #9; 9–6	East Jūryō #7; 4–11	East Jūryō #12; 6–9
2014	West Jūryō #14; 8–7	East Jūryō #10; 6–9	West Jūryō #12; 11–4–P	East Jūryō #5; 5–10	West Jūryō #10; 9–6	West Jūryō #3; 4–11
2015	East Jūryō #9; 9–6	East Jūryō #4; 8–7	West Jūryō #1; 8–7	East Maegashira #15; 7–8	East Maegashira #16; 7–8	West Jūryō #2; 8–7
2016	East Jūryō #1; 7–8	West Jūryō #1; 9–6	West Maegashira #14; 5–10	East Jūryō #3; 8–7	East Jūryō #2; 4–11	West Jūryō #11; 11–4
2017	East Jūryō #4; 4–11	West Jūryō #10; 8–7	East Jūryō #8; 8–7	West Jūryō #6; 4–11	West Jūryō #12; 9–6	East Jūryō #8; 6–9
2018	East Jūryō #10; 8–7	East Jūryō #9; 8–7	East Jūryō #7; 8–7	East Jūryō #6; 6–9	West Jūryō #9; 1–11–3	West Makushita #8; 4–3
2019	East Makushita #6; 4–3	West Makushita #3; 6–1	West Jūryō #14; 7–8	East Makushita #1; 5–2	East Jūryō #12; 2–7–5	West Makushita #6; 3–4
2020	East Makushita #11; 3–4	West Makushita #16; Sat out due to injury 0–0–7	East Makushita #57; Tournament Cancelled; 0–0–0	East Makushita #57; Retired –	x	x
Record given as wins–losses–absences Top division champion Top division runner-up Retired Non-participation Jūryō Lower divisions Sanshō key: F=Fighting spirit; O=Outstanding performance; T=Technique Also shown: ★=Kinboshi; P=Playoff(s); Divisions: Makuuchi — Jūryō — Makushita — Sandanme — Jonidan — Jonokuchi Makuuchi ranks: Yokozuna — Ōzeki — Sekiwake — Komusubi — Maegashira

== See also ==
- Glossary of sumo terms
- List of past sumo wrestlers
- List of Mongolian sumo wrestlers
- List of non-Japanese sumo wrestlers
