= Shikoroyama stable =

Stable of sumo wrestlers in Japan

Coordinates: 35.6822°N 139.7972°E

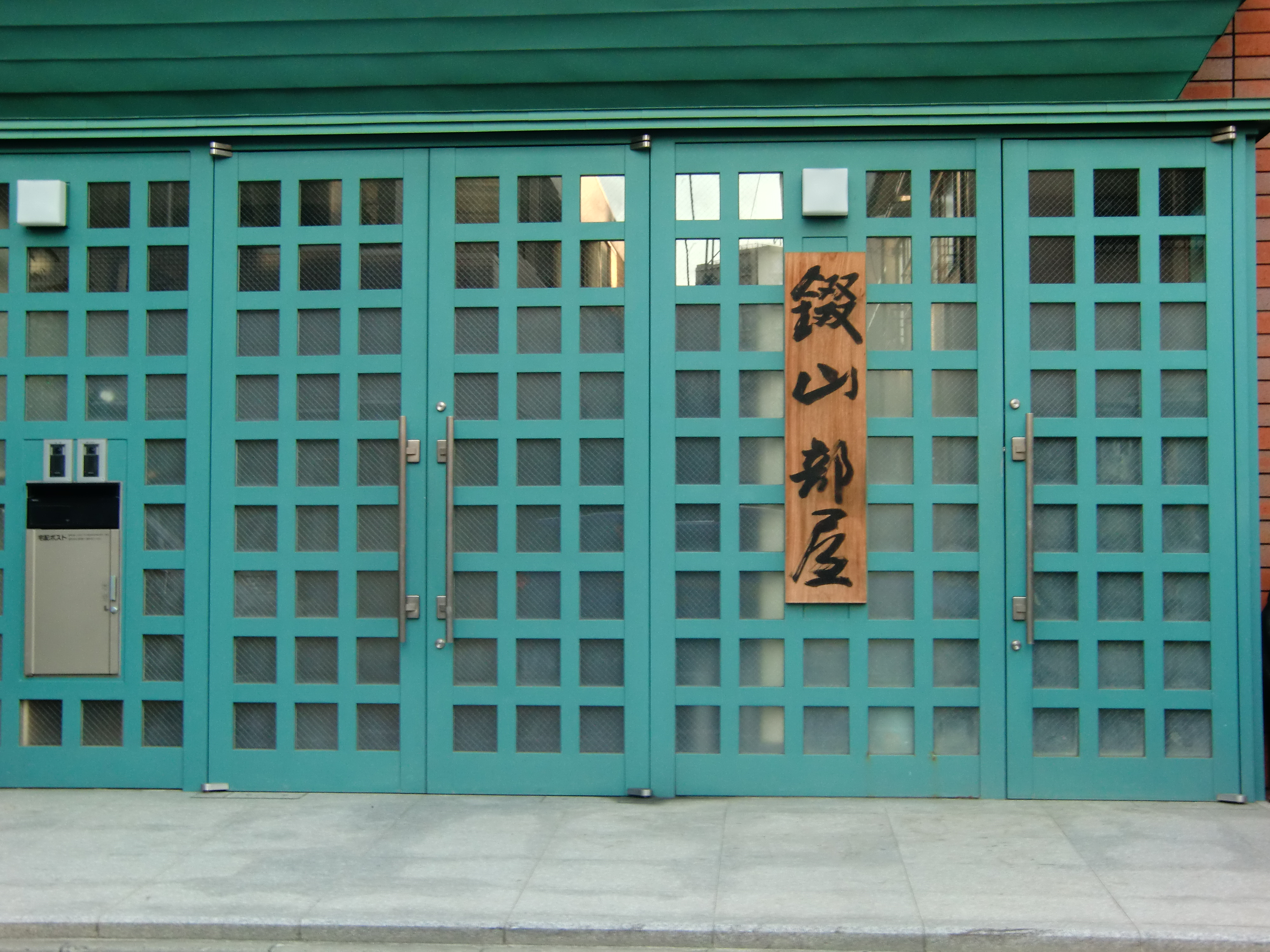

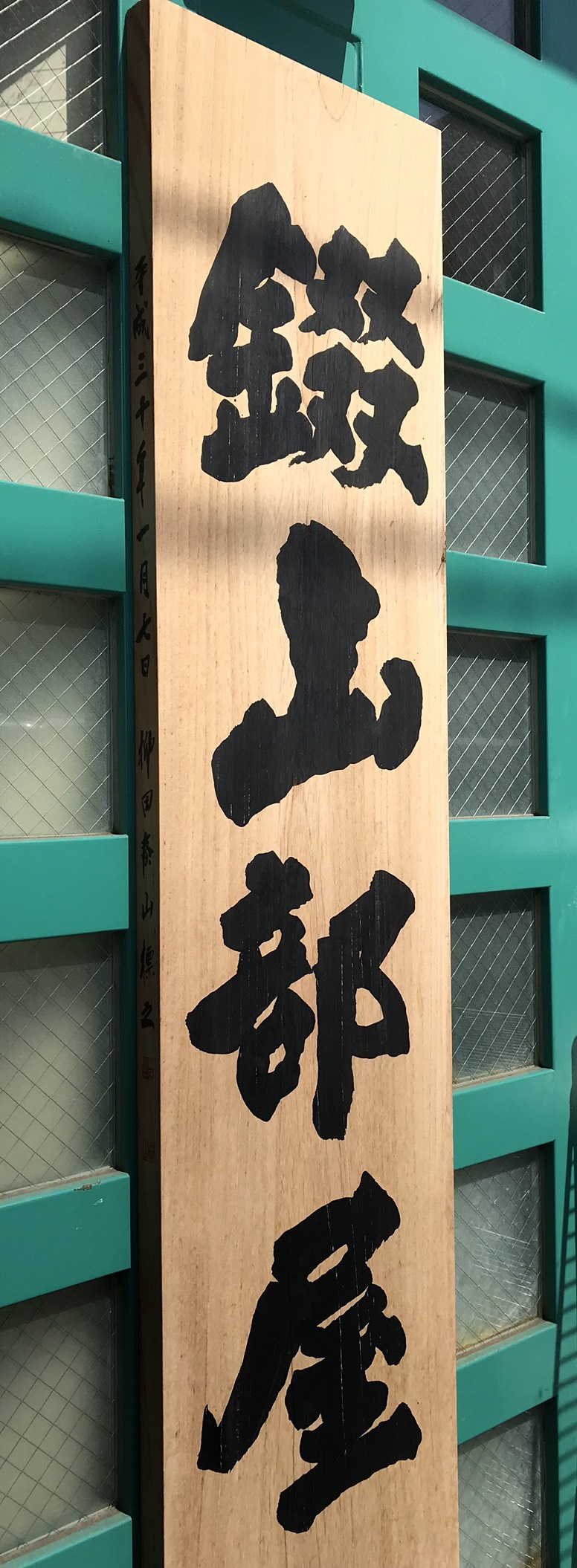

Shikoroyama stable (錣山部屋, Shikoroyama beya) is a stable of sumo wrestlers, formerly part of the Tokitsukaze ichimon or group of stables. It was established in its current form in February 2004 by former sekiwake Terao Tsunefumi, who branched off from the Izutsu stable. He did not take any established wrestlers with him, recruiting all the wrestlers himself instead. In December 2017 Shikoroyama left the Tokitsukaze group along with Tatsutagawa (komusubi Hōmashō) and Minato (maegashira Minatofuji), announcing that he would not join any other ichimon but would support Takanohana in the January 2018 elections to the board of the Japan Sumo Association. In September 2018 the stable joined the Nishonoseki group.

As of May 2026, the stable has 13 active wrestlers.

Hamatensei (real name Issei Amakusa), a junior wrestler who competed for the stable from 2011 to 2019, became a civil servant after completing a correspondence course as part of an arrangement between the Japan Sumo Association and NHK Gakuen senior high school.

Terao died in December 2023. Soon after his death, Tatsutagawa announced his intention to inherit the name Shikoroyama. Tatsutagawa reportedly discussed the changes with Terao's widow and members of the stable. Later in December, the Sumo Association announced that Tatsutagawa was named acting master in charge of managing and supervising wrestlers, and in February 2024 it was officially declared that Hōmashō inherited the name Shikoroyama.

In October 2024, the stable announced the recruitment of Serjbüdeegiin Luvsangombo, son of Dolgorsürengiin Serjbüdee (the former Blue Wolf), nephew of 68th yokozuna Asashōryū, and cousin of the 74th yokozuna Hōshōryū; upon entering professional sumo, Luvsangombo was given the ring name (shikona) of Tenrosei. Like other members of his family such as Hōshōryū, Luvsangombo decided to pursue a career in sumo after studying at Meitoku Gijuku High School in Kōchi Prefecture and spending a year training at the stable.

== Ring name conventions ==
Since the establishment of the stable, some wrestlers at this stable have taken ring names or shikona that begin with the characters 寺尾 (read: terao), in deference to their coach and the stable's owner, the former Terao. Examples include Teraoshō, Teraoumi and Teraowaka.

== Owner ==
- 2024–present: 21st Shikoroyama (iin, komusubi Hōmashō, born 1981)
- 2004–2023: 20th Shikoroyama (sekiwake Terao, 1963–2023)

== Notable active wrestlers ==
- Abi (best rank sekiwake, born 1994)

== Former wrestlers ==
- Hōmashō (komusubi, born 1981)
- Seirō (maegashira 14, born 1988)
- Irodori (jūryō 11, born 1992)

== Referee ==
- Kimura Shunta (sandanme gyōji, real name Shunta Utsugi, born 2002)

== Usher ==
- Setsuo (makushita yobidashi, real name Satoru Kumazaki, born 1988)

== Location and access ==
Tokyo, Kōtō Ward, Kiyosumi 3-6-2
3 minute walk from Kiyosumi-shirakawa Station on the Ōedo Line and Hanzōmon Line

== See also ==
- List of sumo stables
- List of active sumo wrestlers
- List of past sumo wrestlers
- Glossary of sumo terms
