= Hōmashō Noriyuki =

Japanese sumo wrestler

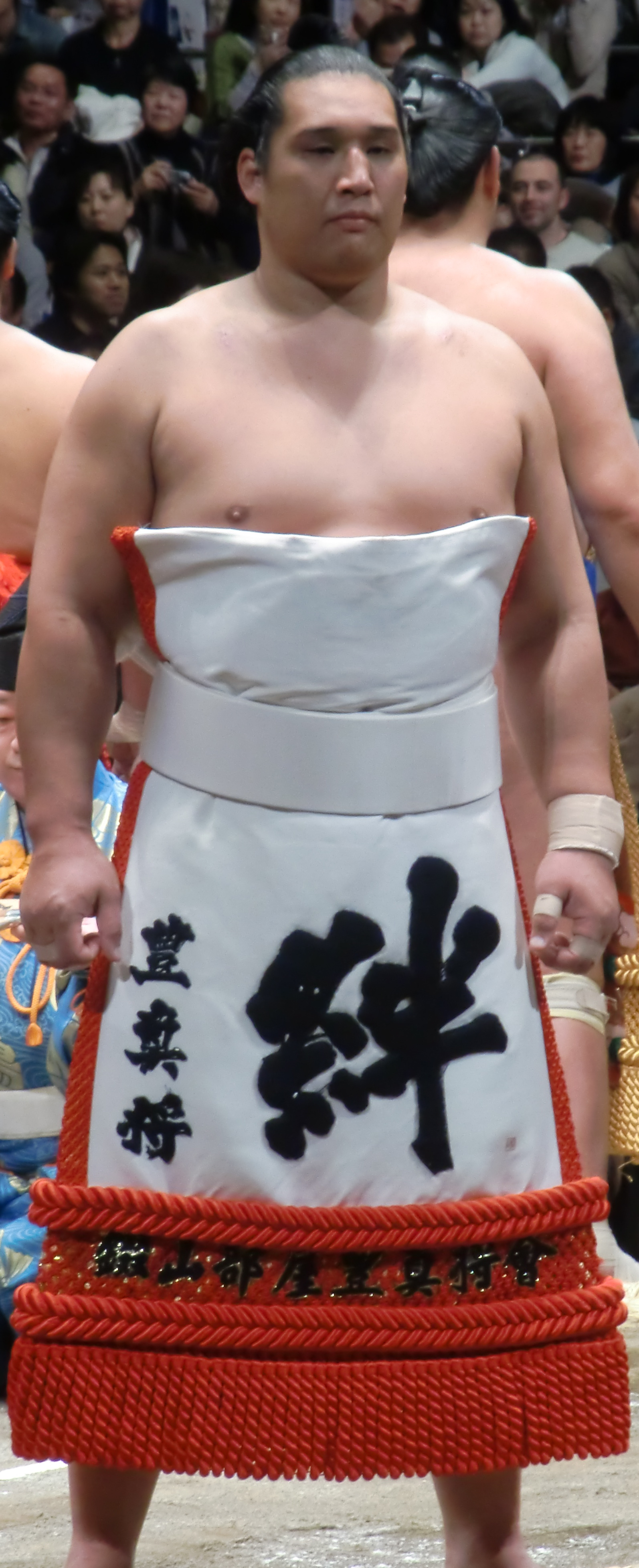

Personal information
- Native name: 豊真将 紀行
- Born: Yōsuke Yamamoto; April 16, 1981 (age 45) Yamaguchi, Japan
- Height: 1.87 m (6 ft 1 1/2 in)
- Weight: 145 kg (320 lb; 22.8 st)
- Website: http://blog.livedoor.jp/houmashou/

Sport
- Sport: Sumo
- University team: Nihon University
- Retired: January 2015
- Heya: Shikoroyama
- Record: 415-344-109
- Debut: March 2004
- Highest rank: Komusubi (Nov 2011)
- Elder name: Shikoroyama
- Championships: 1 (Jūryō); 1 (Sandanme)
- Special Prizes: Fighting Spirit (5); Technique (2)
- Updated on Jan 19, 2015

Hōmashō Noriyuki (born April 16, 1981 as Yōsuke Yamamoto in Shimonoseki, Yamaguchi Prefecture, Japan), is a former sumo wrestler. He turned professional in March 2004 and reached the top makuuchi division in May 2006 as the first sekitori from Shikoroyama stable, without any losing scores on his record. His highest rank was komusubi. He earned seven special prizes in his top division career and was a runner-up in three tournaments. In March 2014 he took the championship in the jūryō division. Hōmashō was a popular wrestler among sumo fans, and was noted for his deep and graceful bow at the end of a match. Upon his retirement in January 2015 he became an elder of the Japan Sumo Association under the name of Tatsutagawa.

== Early life and sumo background ==
He graduated from Saitama Sakae High School and was accepted by the Nihon University sumo club. However, due to cellulitis, he had to quit the club and instead did various part-time jobs in between attending lectures at the university. He did not make his professional debut until March 2004, at the age of nearly 23, just before the upper age limit set by the Sumo Association. He was recruited by former sekiwake Terao, the head coach of the newly opened Shikoroyama stable, who he had admired as a young boy.

== Career ==
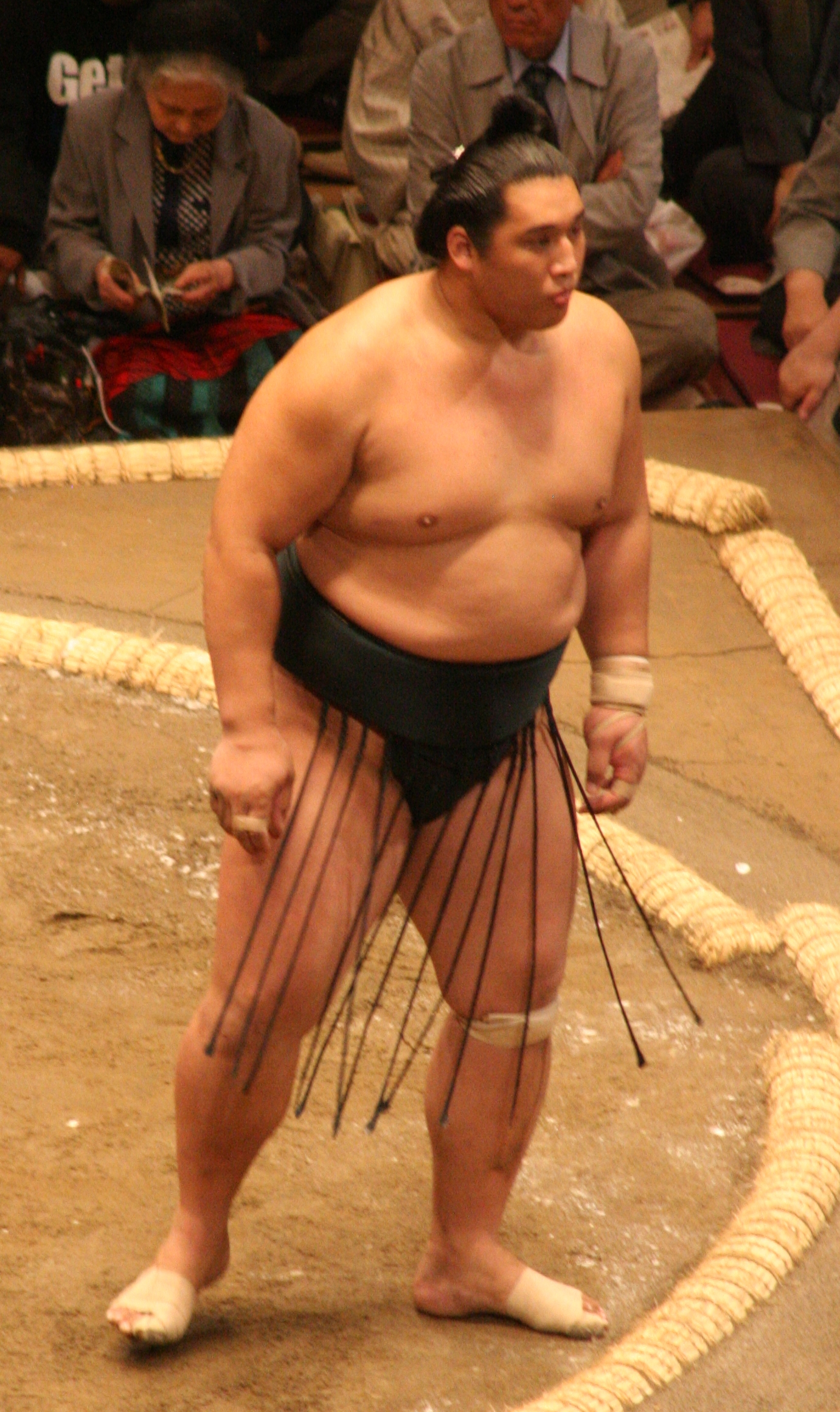

Initially fighting under his real surname of Yamamoto, he rose through the lower divisions quickly, capturing the yūshō or tournament championship in the sandanme division with a perfect 7-0 record in November 2004, upon which he changed his shikona to Hōmashō. He achieved kachi-koshi in every tournament until he reached the top makuuchi division, only the third wrestler to do so since 1958, following Akebono and Kotoōshū. He moved through the second highest jūryō division in just two tournaments. He took his first make-koshi or losing score in his top division debut in May 2006, but an exceptional result of 12-3 in November of that year, in which he was runner-up, gained him two prizes.

Hōmashō was promoted to maegashira 4 for the following tournament in January 2007. He only managed a 7-8 score there and so slipped down the rankings slightly, but he produced a strong 11-4 record from maegashira 5 in March 2007, which earned him his second Technique prize. He was promoted to his highest rank to date of maegashira 1 for the following tournament, just missing out on the two available komusubi positions which instead went to the demoted sekiwake Kotoshōgiku, and Toyonoshima who had scored 8-7 at maegashira 1.

Hōmashō suffered his first big setback in the May 2007 tournament, dropping his last four matches (all against maegashira ranked wrestlers) to finish with a poor 5-10 record. In July 2007 he won nine of his first ten bouts but lost the last five, finishing on 9-6. He returned to maegashira 1 in September and recorded eight wins, but again was not promoted to the san'yaku ranks, instead being moved from the west to the east side of the banzuke. He would only manage three wins at that rank in the November tournament.

At the end of 2007 he dropped 10 kilos in weight, due to the effects of medication for high cholesterol, and he turned in a poor 4-11 score in January 2008, sliding to maegashira 13 for the March 2008 tournament. At this low rank he was able to produce a kachi-koshi score of 9-6. He had climbed to maegashira 2 by September 2008 but was unable to compete in that tournament due to a wrist injury, the first time in his career that he has missed any bouts. After having surgery, he returned in November but despite being ranked as low as maegashira 15 he could only win seven matches. He was one of seven wrestlers who NHK commentator Shuhei Nagao (the former Mainoumi) in 2008 called the "Seven Samurai" and identified as "holding the key" to a Japanese resurgence in sumo, which was dominated by foreigners in the top ranks. (The others were Gōeidō, Kisenosato, Kotoshogiku, Toyohibiki, Toyonoshima and Tochiozan).

Hōmashō was in better condition for the January 2009 tournament and from the very bottom maegashira 16 rank he scored eleven wins and won the Fighting Spirit Prize. In the following tournament in March he won nine bouts in a row from 2-3, finishing as a runner-up with another 11-4 score and winning his second successive Fighting Spirit Prize, and third overall. Once again he was denied a san'yaku debut, with the komusubi positions going to Kakuryū and Tochiōzan, and was ranked at maegashira 1 for the fourth time in the May 2009 tournament. However, he performed very badly in May, losing his first fourteen matches before managing a solitary win on the final day. He recovered to score 10-5 in July.

He rose to maegashira 2 for the May 2010 tournament, but withdrew after losing his first six matches, citing an injury to his cervical vertebrae picked up in training shortly before the tournament. He made a strong comeback in July, winning his first ten bouts and finishing joint runner-up alongside Aran and Kakuryū on 11-4. He was awarded his fourth Fighting Spirit Prize (shared with Aran). In the September tournament he defeated ōzeki Kotoōshū and Baruto on consecutive days. This came after he had lost his previous twenty matches against ōzeki ranked wrestlers. However, he lost five of his last six matches to finish with a disappointing 7-8 score. Ranked at maegashira 2 in May 2011, he won just three bouts; although these did include wins over Kotoōshū and sekiwake Kisenosato. Fighting from a more comfortable position at maegashira 9 in the July tournament, he scored 11-4 and won his fifth Fighting Spirit Prize and seventh Special Prize overall. This resulted in his promotion to maegashira 1 for the fifth time in the September 2011 tournament. He is the first wrestler to be ranked at maegashira 1 more than three times without ever making the san'yaku ranks.

In the September tournament he went 10-5, including victories over all three ōzeki, and this performance saw him finally reach san'yaku in the November 2011 tournament at komusubi rank. At 30 years and six months he became the fourth oldest san'yaku debutant since the six tournament a year system began in 1958. He was able to win only four matches in his komusubi debut. In 2012 he reached komusubi twice more, in May and November, but scored only 4–11 in these tournaments too. He was forced to sit out the first two tournaments of 2013 after undergoing shoulder surgery, resulting in a fall to the bottom of the jūryō division. He returned to the top division in September 2013 but after missing the opening tournament of 2014 through injury he was once again demoted to jūryō.

He came back strongly by taking the jūryō championship with a 14–1 record, losing only on the final day. His 9-6 showing in the following May 2014 tournament would again put him into the upper makuuchi ranks, the level he had been competing at before his injuries sidelined him. However he had to withdraw from the July 2014 tournament after damaging his right hamstring and right anterior cruciate ligament in a defeat to Harumafuji on Day 5.

== Retirement from sumo ==
Hōmashō never managed to return to competition and in the middle of the January 2015 tournament, which he sat out of, he announced his retirement. He has stayed in sumo as a coach at his stable under the name Tatsutagawa-oyakata. His retirement ceremony or danpatsu-shiki was held before a sell-out crowd of 10,000 at the Ryōgoku Kokugikan in January 2016, and unusually saw him rotate and face all four sides of the hall during the ceremony so all spectators could get a good view. He put on his mawashi again in February 2016 when he took part in an exhibition bout against Furiwake-oyakata (the former Takamisakari) in the 40th Fuji TV Grand Sumo Tournament held at the Kokugikan. He takes an active role in training and has helped to develop top wrestlers such as Abi.

Following the death of stablemaster Shikoroyama (ex-sekiwake Terao) in December 2023, Hōmashō announced his intention to inherit his late master's name. The changes, which were reportedly discussed with Terao's widow and members of the stable, were approved by the Sumo Association on 23 February 2024.

== Fighting style ==
Hōmashō was a straightforward, unspectacular yotsu-sumo wrestler, rarely employing throwing moves. His favourite grip on his opponent's mawashi was a left hand outside, right hand inside position, or migi-yotsu. Yori-kiri (force out) and yori-taoshi (force out and down) accounted for about 45 percent of his career wins. He was admired for his deep and respectful bow to his opponents after losing a match.

== Personal life ==
Hōmashō is married with two sons, born in 2011 and 2013.

== Career record ==
Hōmashō Noriyuki
Year	January Hatsu basho, Tokyo	March Haru basho, Osaka	May Natsu basho, Tokyo	July Nagoya basho, Nagoya	September Aki basho, Tokyo	November Kyūshū basho, Fukuoka
2004	x	(Maezumo)	East Jonokuchi #13; 4–3	East Jonidan #114; 6–1	West Jonidan #33; 6–1	West Sandanme #68; 7–0–P; Champion
2005	East Makushita #42; 4–3	East Makushita #34; 5–2	West Makushita #24; 6–1	East Makushita #8; 4–3	East Makushita #7; 5–2	East Makushita #3; 5–2
2006	East Jūryō #12; 10–5	East Jūryō #5; 12–3	East Maegashira #11; 6–9	East Maegashira #14; 9–6	East Maegashira #11; 7–8	East Maegashira #11; 12–3; FT
2007	West Maegashira #4; 7–8	West Maegashira #5; 11–4; T	East Maegashira #1; 5–10	East Maegashira #6; 9–6	West Maegashira #1; 8–7	East Maegashira #1; 3–12
2008	West Maegashira #7; 4–11	East Maegashira #13; 9–6	West Maegashira #11; 9–6	East Maegashira #6; 9–6	West Maegashira #2; Sat out due to injury 0–0–15	West Maegashira #15; 7–8
2009	East Maegashira #16; 11–4; F	East Maegashira #7; 11–4; F	East Maegashira #1; 1–14	East Maegashira #15; 10–5	West Maegashira #6; 7–8	West Maegashira #7; 6–9
2010	East Maegashira #12; 9–6	West Maegashira #5; 9–6	East Maegashira #2; 0–7–8	East Maegashira #13; 11–4; F	East Maegashira #2; 7–8	East Maegashira #3; 7–8
2011	East Maegashira #4; 8–7	Tournament Cancelled; 0–0–0	East Maegashira #2; 3–12	East Maegashira #9; 11–4; F	East Maegashira #1; 10–5	West Komusubi #1; 4–11
2012	East Maegashira #4; 7–8	West Maegashira #5; 11–4	East Komusubi #1; 4–11	East Maegashira #6; 9–6	East Maegashira #3; 9–6	West Komusubi #1; 4–11
2013	East Maegashira #5; Sat out due to injury 0–0–15	East Jūryō #1; Sat out due to injury 0–0–15	West Jūryō #14; 9–6	West Jūryō #6; 9–6	West Maegashira #13; 10–5	East Maegashira #4; 5–10
2014	West Maegashira #7; Sat out due to injury 0–0–15	West Jūryō #2; 14–1; Champion	East Maegashira #7; 9–6	East Maegashira #2; 1–5–9	East Maegashira #13; Sat out due to injury 0–0–15	West Jūryō #9; Sat out due to injury 0–0–15
2015	East Makushita #7; Retired; 0–0–3	x	x	x	x	x
Record given as wins–losses–absences Top division champion Top division runner-up Retired Lower divisions Non-participation Sanshō key: F=Fighting spirit; O=Outstanding performance; T=Technique Also shown: ★=Kinboshi; P=Playoff(s); Divisions: Makuuchi — Jūryō — Makushita — Sandanme — Jonidan — Jonokuchi Makuuchi ranks: Yokozuna — Ōzeki — Sekiwake — Komusubi — Maegashira

== See also ==
- Glossary of sumo terms
- List of sumo tournament top division runners-up
- List of sumo tournament second division champions
- List of past sumo wrestlers
- List of sumo elders
- List of komusubi
