= Abi Masatora =

Japanese sumo wrestler

Abi Masatora 阿炎 政虎
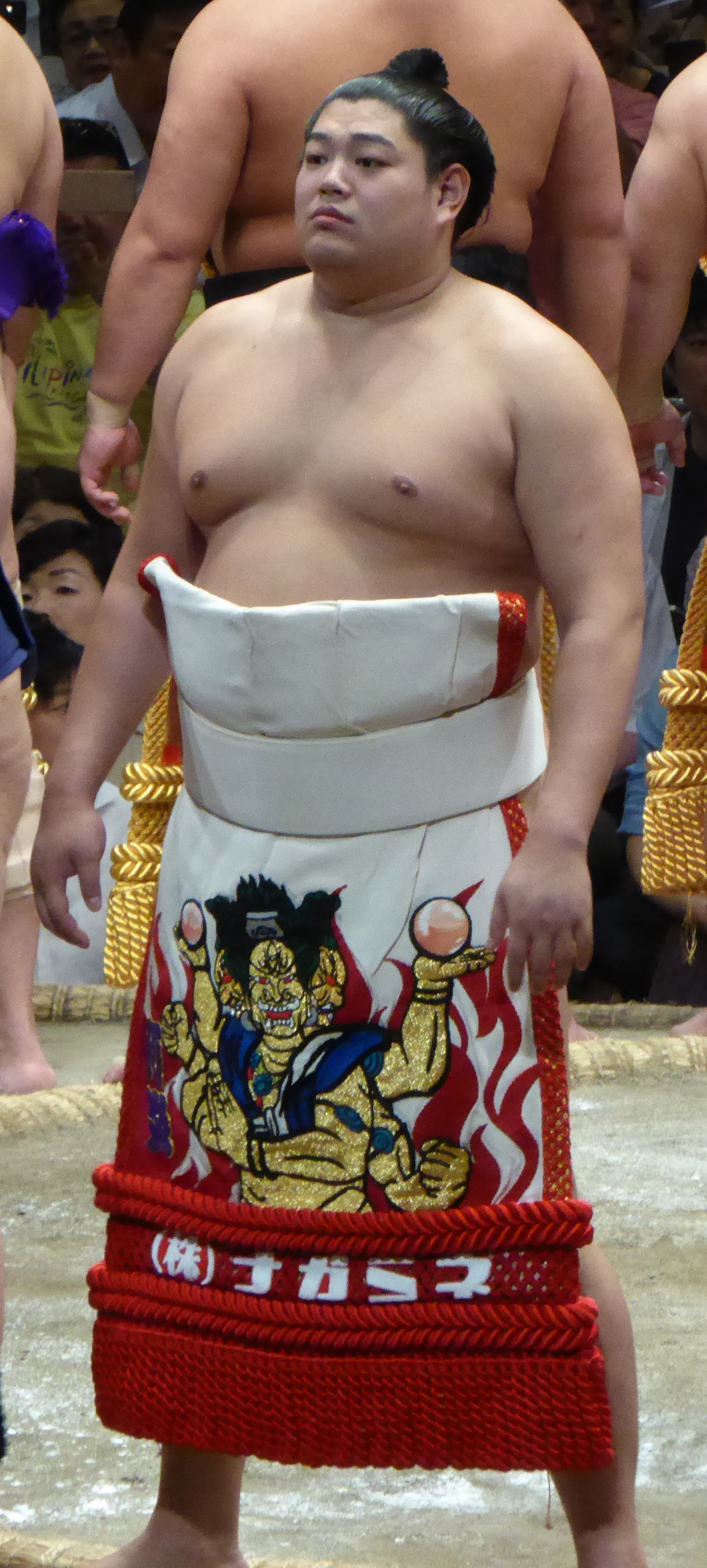
- Abi in 2018

Personal information
- Born: Kōsuke Horikiri; May 4, 1994 (age 32) Koshigaya city, Saitama Prefecture
- Height: 1.88 m (6 ft 2 in)
- Weight: 167 kg (368 lb)

Sport
- Sport: Sumo
- Rank: see below
- Heya: Shikoroyama
- Debut: May 2013
- Highest rank: Sekiwake (March, 2022)
- Championships: (1) Makuuchi (2) Jūryō (3) Makushita (1) Sandanme (1) Jonidan
- Special Prizes: 4 Fighting Spirit; 1 Outstanding Performance
- Gold Stars: 5 Hakuhō; Kakuryū; Terunofuji; Hōshōryū (2)
- Updated on 16 July 2025

Abi Masatora (Japanese: 阿炎 政虎; born May 4, 1994 as Kōsuke Horikiri (堀切 洸助, Horikiri Kōsuke)) is a Japanese professional sumo wrestler from Saitama Prefecture. He made his debut in May 2013 and wrestles for Shikoroyama stable. He reached the top makuuchi division in January 2018 and has four special prizes for Fighting Spirit and one for Outstanding Performance. He has five gold stars for yokozuna upsets. His highest rank has been sekiwake. He won his first championship in November 2022.

== Early life and sumo experience ==
Kōsuke Horikiri is the youngest of four children, born into a family that ran a construction company. He was a head taller than most of his classmates as a student. Unlike other members of his family, he was not inclined towards sports as he was somewhat overweight and didn't like running. He tried judo, but found he excelled more at sumo; taking the children's sumo championship in his city in both his first and second years of primary school. Though he was skilled at sumo, he didn't like the sport at first, especially practice, and would often try to avoid it. As the sumo at the city level was not challenging enough he began participating in national children's sumo tournaments but achieved little success. He did not see sumo in his future but as most of his friends were involved in the sport, he continued. Having a very gregarious nature, he made friends quickly at tournaments, among them being future makuuchi wrestlers Daieishō and Hokutōfuji.

In junior high school Horikiri began to find sumo more appealing, placing well in tournaments. This culminated in taking 3rd place in the national junior high school sumo tournament in Kagoshima. Horikiri recalled being so certain he would be eliminated on the first day, that he brought a swimsuit for swimming in the nearby sea so he would have something to do for the rest of the tournament.

He transferred to Nagareyama High School and joined the sumo club. One of his classmates there was future Daishōhō. He was successful at the high school level, often placing in the best sixteen. In his 3rd year of high school, he placed 3rd in the 61st Towada Sumo Tournament in the individual category, losing to the future san'yaku wrestler Ichinojō.

His family hoped he would go on to university and continue sumo there, but Horikiri instead expressed interest in taking over the family business. Not long afterwards, without consulting his parents he made the decision to enter Shikoroyama stable because his sumo coach was close with its head, the former Terao. His parents had not expected this sudden change and were reluctant to meet with his coach at first, but Horikiri convinced them of his fervor.

== Sumo career ==
In his first tournament in July 2013 he achieved a 6–1 record, losing only to Ikeru (who himself was also in his debut and went on to win the jonokuchi championship). In the following tournament in September, in the jonidan division, he had a 7–0 record, and took the championship, beating Aokishin in a playoff. In the next tournament, which was his sandanme debut, he only achieved a 4–3 but following that in January 2014 he got another perfect record and took the sandanme division championship. Over the next year, he posted four winning tournaments out of six. He was promoted to the salaried ranks of jūryō for the March 2015 tournament along with Amakaze and Ishiura. On this promotion, he chose the shikona of Abi which was the idea of his coach the aforementioned former sekiwake Terao. Abi was pronounced the same as Shikoroyama coach's nickname. The characters used were chosen in the hope that Horikiri could be strong like the many armed Asura (of which the first character is the same as in Abi's first character) and "on fire" in the ring (the second character means "flaming").

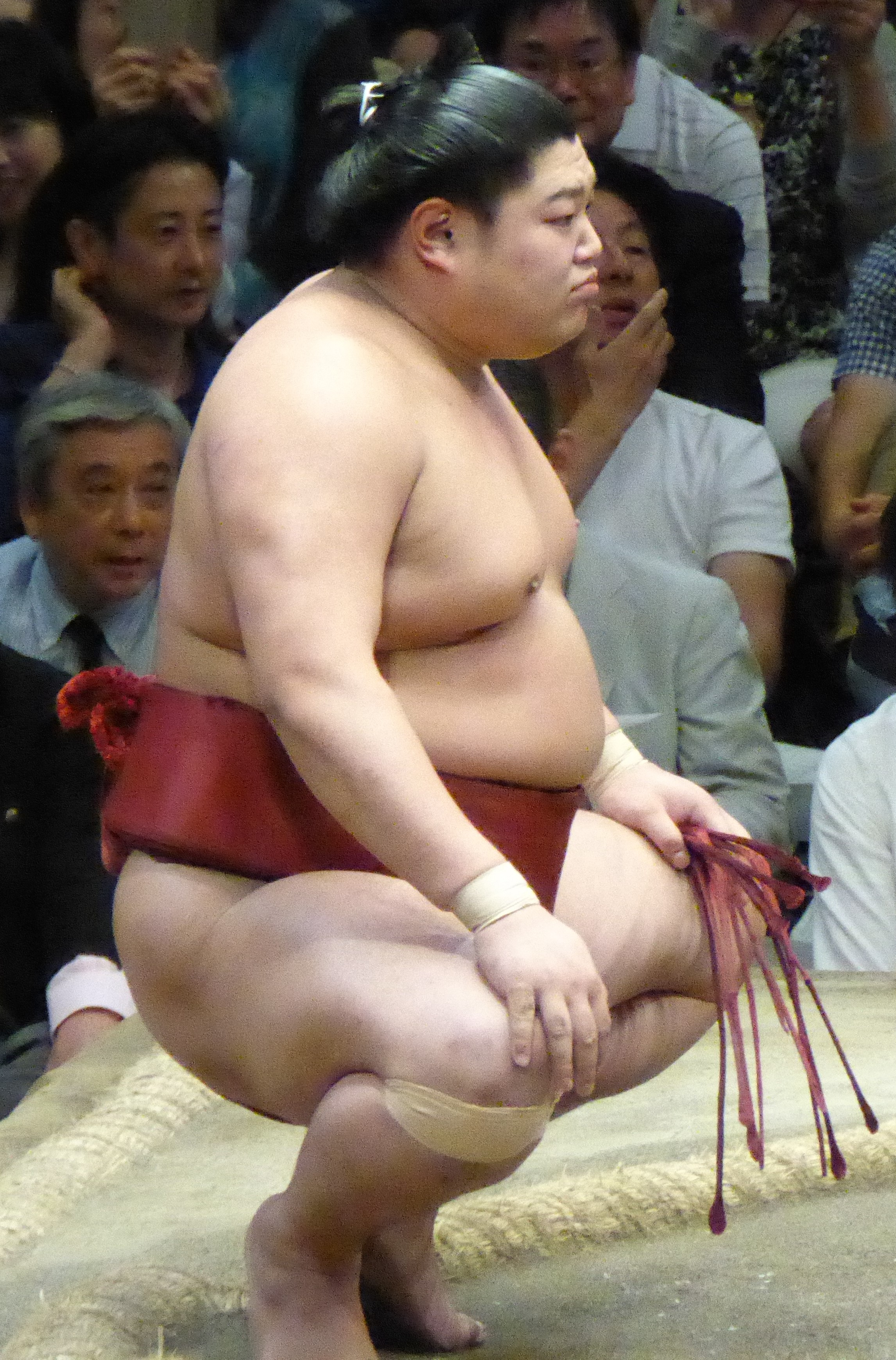
During the May 2018 tournament

Though he lasted four tournaments in the division, he only managed one winning tournament and was demoted back to makushita after the September 2015 tournament. He spent the next eight tournaments moving up and down the top third of the makushita division. In the March 2017 tournament at makushita 16 he got a 7–0 record and took the championship. He would follow this with a strong 5–2 in May, which would finally garner re-promotion to jūryō in July 2017, in which he achieved a winning tournament (8–7). In the next tournament in September at jūryō 11 he posted a 10–5 record and on the final day beat both Homarefuji and Kotoyūki in a playoff to take the championship. An 11–4 record at jūryō 5 in November would propel him to the top flight makuuchi division for the first time. In his debut in January 2018 at maegashira 14 he had a record of 10–5 and earned the Fighting Spirit Prize along with Ryūden. Another 10-5 for the March 2018 tournament saw him promoted to maegashira 2 for the May tournament, where he recorded only seven wins but earned his first kinboshi by defeating the yokozuna Hakuhō on day 6. He won his second kinboshi in consecutive tournaments in July 2018 with a victory over Kakuryū on Day 5. In May 2019 he won ten bouts and shared the Fighting Spirit prize with tournament winner Asanoyama and top division debutant Shimanoumi. Abi clinched the prize on the final day by defeating Tamawashi, and said he was inspired by Asanoyama, who is the same age. This performance earned him promotion to the san'yaku ranks for the first time at komusubi. He followed up with 8–7 and 9–6 records in the next two tournaments but did not get promoted to sekiwake as there were no openings at that rank (with it being filled by Mitakeumi and the demoted ōzeki Takakeishō in September and Tochinoshin in November).

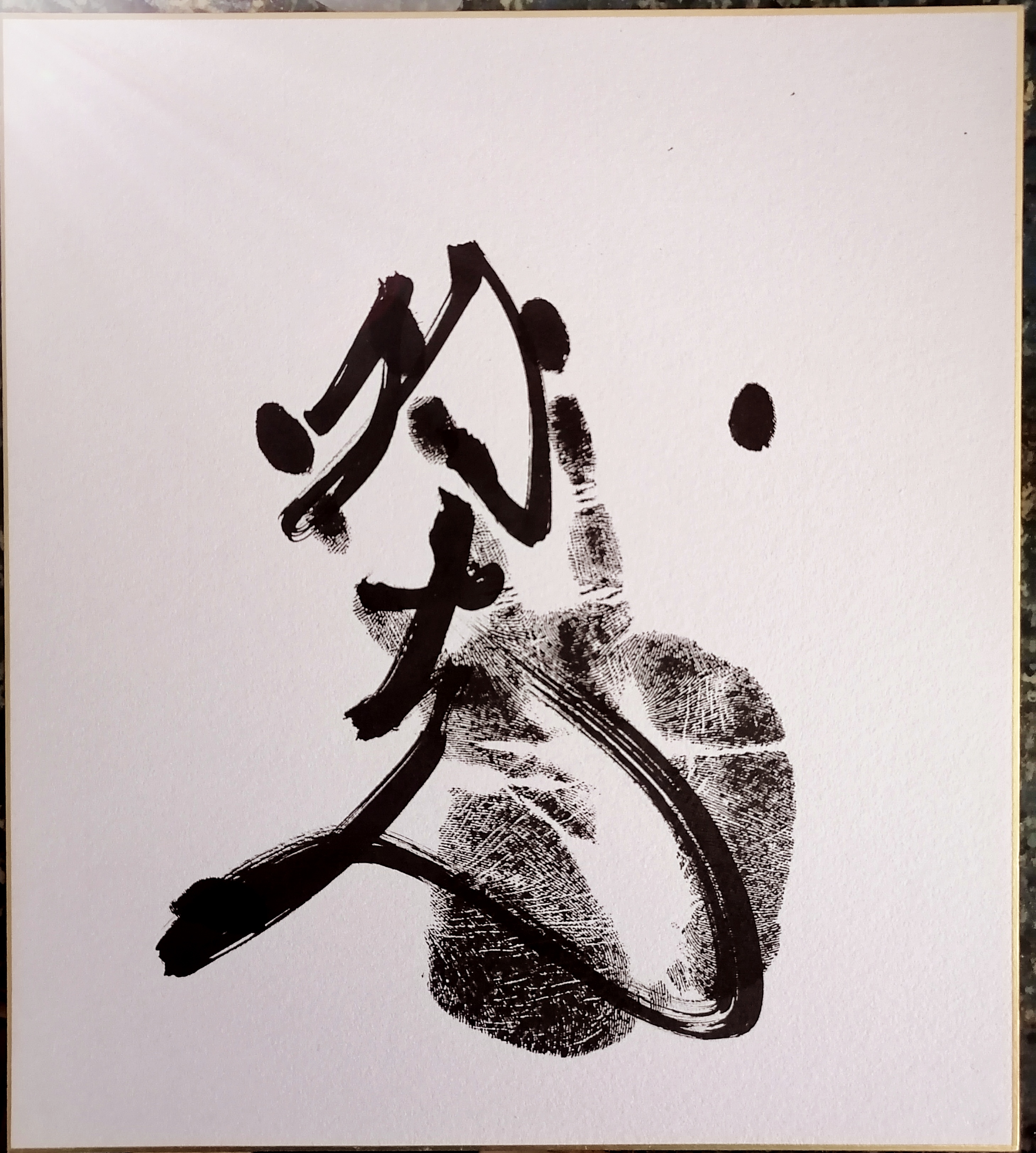
Tegata (handprint + autograph) of Abi

He was reprimanded by the Japan Sumo Association (JSA) in November 2019 after he posted an image on Instagram of his friend and fellow wrestler Wakamotoharu tied up and gagged with tape as a prank. It was deemed inappropriate and Abi and Wakamotoharu apologized in person to JSA chairman Hakkaku and the board of directors for the incident. The JSA has advised wrestlers not to post on their individual social media in future, although accounts run by the stables are not affected. In the following November tournament in Kyushu he produced another 9–6 record from the rank of komusubi. He was ranked at komusubi on the January 2020 banzuke for the fourth tournament in a row; the first time this has happened since Kisenosato spent four straight tournaments at komusubi from July 2006 until January 2007. In February 2020 he was reprimanded again after he told reporters, unprompted, that he had slept through a workshop organized by the JSA to explain the changes to their social media policy that he had instigated.

He was withdrawn by his stablemaster partway through the July 2020 tournament after he admitted to twice visiting a hostess bar with a low-ranking wrestler from another stable, against the guidance on nonessential travel given by the JSA to prevent the spread of the COVID-19 virus. The JSA chairman, Hakkaku, called his actions "unpardonable." Abi submitted a retirement notice through his stablemaster on August 4, which was not immediately accepted. Later that week, the JSA suspended Abi for three tournaments and reduced his pay and that of his stablemaster while rejecting his resignation. It emerged that he had gone out several more times than the two occasions to which he had admitted. Despite having recently got married, he was told to move back into his stable and be under strict supervision. His retirement papers are being kept on file by the JSA and will be activated if there are any further transgressions. It is notable that during the award ceremony when he won the November 2022 tournament, Abi was asked how he felt about his stablemaster. Abi responded by saying "I have been giving him nothing but trouble. I hope I could make him happy" (referring to his past transgressions). He then became tearful and the audience applauded him in support.

Abi was next eligible to compete in the March 2021 tournament, where he was ranked at makushita 56. He won both the March and May tournaments with perfect 7-0 records, ensuring his return to sekitori for the July 2021 honbasho. In November 2021 he was promoted back to makuuchi. On Day 13 of the November tournament, having had only one loss, he defeated ōzeki Takakeishō to stand alone in second place on the leaderboard, just one win behind tournament leader Terunofuji. His hopes of winning the tournament were ended the following day when he was defeated by Terunofuji, and he also lost on the final day to Takanoshō. However his 12–3 record was still good enough for a share of second place, and he received his third career Fighting Spirit prize. Fighting from the higher rank of maegashira 6 in the subsequent January tournament, Abi once again remained in contention for the title until the final day and finished as runner-up when yokozuna Terunofuji was defeated by tournament champion sekiwake Mitakeumi. He received his third gold star for defeating a yokozuna by upsetting Terunofuji in their regulation bout on day 14 and was awarded his first shukun-shō special prize for Outstanding Performance.

For his consecutive runner-up performances, Abi jumped up in the rankings to a new career high at sumo's third-highest rank of sekiwake for the March 2022 tournament. It marked his return to san'yaku since being ranked at komusubi for four tournaments in 2019 and 2020. He held his sekiwake rank for the following tournament, but was defeated on the final day in May by Wakatakakage to fall to a 7–8 record.

A few weeks before the September 2022 tournament, Abi tested positive for COVID-19. The JSA at the time had yet to determine whether or not Abi could participate in the tournament. However, Abi announced his withdrawal on the eve of the tournament due to knee and ankle injuries. The injuries required surgery and about three weeks of rehabilitation. Returning in November, Abi won his first top division championship with a 12–3 record, defeating tournament leader Takayasu on the final day and then winning a three-way playoff by defeating Takayasu and Takakeishō in consecutive matches. It was the first time a three-way playoff had been since in the top division since 1994 and made Abi the sixth different winner of a top division championship in 2022. Speaking to reporters the following day, Abi said he was looking forward to seeing his stablemaster Shikoroyama, who was unable to travel to Kyushu to see Abi's victory due to ill health.

During the first days of the March 2024 tournament, Abi stood out by taking back-to-back victories over two of the four ōzeki at the time (Takakeishō and Kirishima). In August 2024, Abi injured his back during a training session and had to withdraw from the summer tour. Later that month, he confided that his condition had improved thanks to acupuncture, and the press also reported his good results in team training prior to the September tournament.

On Day 4 of the May 2025 tournament Abi earned his fourth career gold star by defeating yokozuna Hōshōryū.

Ranked as a double-digit maegashira for the first time since November 2021, Abi started the January 2026 tournament excellently, recording six consecutive victories from the opening day. Abi went into the final day of the tournament with ten wins and four losses, being able to claim a Fighting Spirit Prize with an eleventh victory. However, he was defeated by sekiwake Kirishima and did not receive the award.

Following a poor start to the March 2026 tournament, Abi, whose back was heavily taped, withdrew on the third day after suffering a loss to Ichiyamamoto, citing a partial spine fracture. This is his first tournament absence since Aki 2022. He returned to competition on Day 9, facing maegashira Churanoumi.

== Personal life ==
Abi was married in June 2020 after a three-year relationship. The couple have one daughter.

== Fighting style ==
Abi is a tsuki-oshi specialist, meaning he prefers to slap and push his opponents rather than fighting on the mawashi or belt. His most common winning kimarite are oshi-dashi (push out), hataki-komi (slap down) and tsuki-dashi (thrust out). Although he is known for his aggressiveness of his pushing and slapping attacks, he frequently uses and wins by henka (sidestepping) in his tachiai, especially since his comeback to Makuuchi in November 2021, which has been widely criticized as below the dignity of top-division wrestlers. For example, during the three-way playoff in November 2022, Abi defeated Takayasu by a henka at the tachiai and a violent slap down, giving Takayasu a concussion as he was seen unable to walk off the dohyo on his own.

== Career record ==
Abi Masatora
Year	January Hatsu basho, Tokyo	March Haru basho, Osaka	May Natsu basho, Tokyo	July Nagoya basho, Nagoya	September Aki basho, Tokyo	November Kyūshū basho, Fukuoka
2013	x	x	(Maezumō)	East Jonokuchi #19; 6–1	West Jonidan #33; 7–0–P; Champion	East Sandanme #34; 4–3
2014	West Sandanme #23; 7–0; Champion	West Makushita #13; 3–4	East Makushita #18; 5–2	West Makushita #11; 5–2	East Makushita #7; 3–4	East Makushita #11; 6–1
2015	West Makushita #2; 5–2	East Jūryō #12; 7–8	East Jūryō #13; 8–7	West Jūryō #10; 7–8	West Jūryō #11; 5–10	West Makushita #1; 3–4
2016	West Makushita #4; 4–3	East Makushita #2; 2–5	East Makushita #12; 5–2	West Makushita #4; 1–6	West Makushita #21; 3–4	West Makushita #28; 4–3
2017	East Makushita #24; 5–2	East Makushita #16; 7–0; Champion	East Makushita #1; 5–2	East Jūryō #14; 8–7	West Jūryō #11; 10–5–PP; Champion	West Jūryō #5; 11–4
2018	East Maegashira #14; 10–5; F	East Maegashira #7; 10–5	West Maegashira #2; 7–8 ★	East Maegashira #3; 6–9 ★	West Maegashira #4; 6–9	East Maegashira #7; 6–9
2019	West Maegashira #10; 10–5	West Maegashira #6; 8–7	West Maegashira #4; 10–5; F	East Komusubi #1; 8–7	East Komusubi #1; 9–6	East Komusubi #1; 9–6
2020	East Komusubi #1; 5–10	West Maegashira #4; 7–8	East Maegashira #5; Tournament Cancelled; State of Emergency; 0–0–0	East Maegashira #5; 3–4–8	West Maegashira #14; Suspended; 0–0–15	West Jūryō #11; Suspended; 0–0–15
2021	East Makushita #16; Suspended; 0–0–7	West Makushita #56; 7–0; Champion	East Makushita #7; 7–0; Champion	East Jūryō #14; 11–4	East Jūryō #5; 13–2; Champion	West Maegashira #15; 12–3; F
2022	West Maegashira #6; 12–3; O★	West Sekiwake #1; 8–7	West Sekiwake #1; 7–8	West Komusubi #1; 8–7	East Komusubi #1; Sat out due to injury 0–0–15	West Maegashira #9; 12–3–PP; F
2023	East Maegashira #3; 8–7	East Maegashira #2; 9–6	East Maegashira #1; 8–7	West Komusubi #1; 6–9	East Maegashira #2; 9–6	East Komusubi #1; 6–9
2024	West Maegashira #2; 8–7	East Komusubi #1; 9–6	West Sekiwake #1; 10–5	East Sekiwake #1; 8–7	East Sekiwake #1; 5–10	East Maegashira #3; 11–4; O
2025	East Komusubi #1; 7–8	West Komusubi #1; 6–9	East Maegashira #2; 7–8 ★	West Maegashira #2; 9–6 ★	West Maegashira #1; 3–12	West Maegashira #7; 5–10
2026	West Maegashira #12; 10–5	East Maegashira #5; 4–6–5	East Maegashira #9; 5–10	West Maegashira #12; 7–8	West Maegashira #13; 8–7	West Maegashira #12; 6–9
Record given as wins–losses–absences Top division champion Top division runner-up Retired Non-participation Jūryō Lower divisions Sanshō key: F=Fighting spirit; O=Outstanding performance; T=Technique Also shown: ★=Kinboshi; P=Playoff(s); Divisions: Makuuchi — Jūryō — Makushita — Sandanme — Jonidan — Jonokuchi Makuuchi ranks: Yokozuna — Ōzeki — Sekiwake — Komusubi — Maegashira

== See also ==
- List of sumo tournament top division champions
- List of sumo tournament top division runners-up
- List of sumo tournament second division champions
- Glossary of sumo terms
- List of active sumo wrestlers
- List of active gold star earners
- List of sekiwake
- Active special prize winners
