= Minato stable =

Stable (organization) of sumo wrestlers

Coordinates: 35.8295°N 139.7029°E

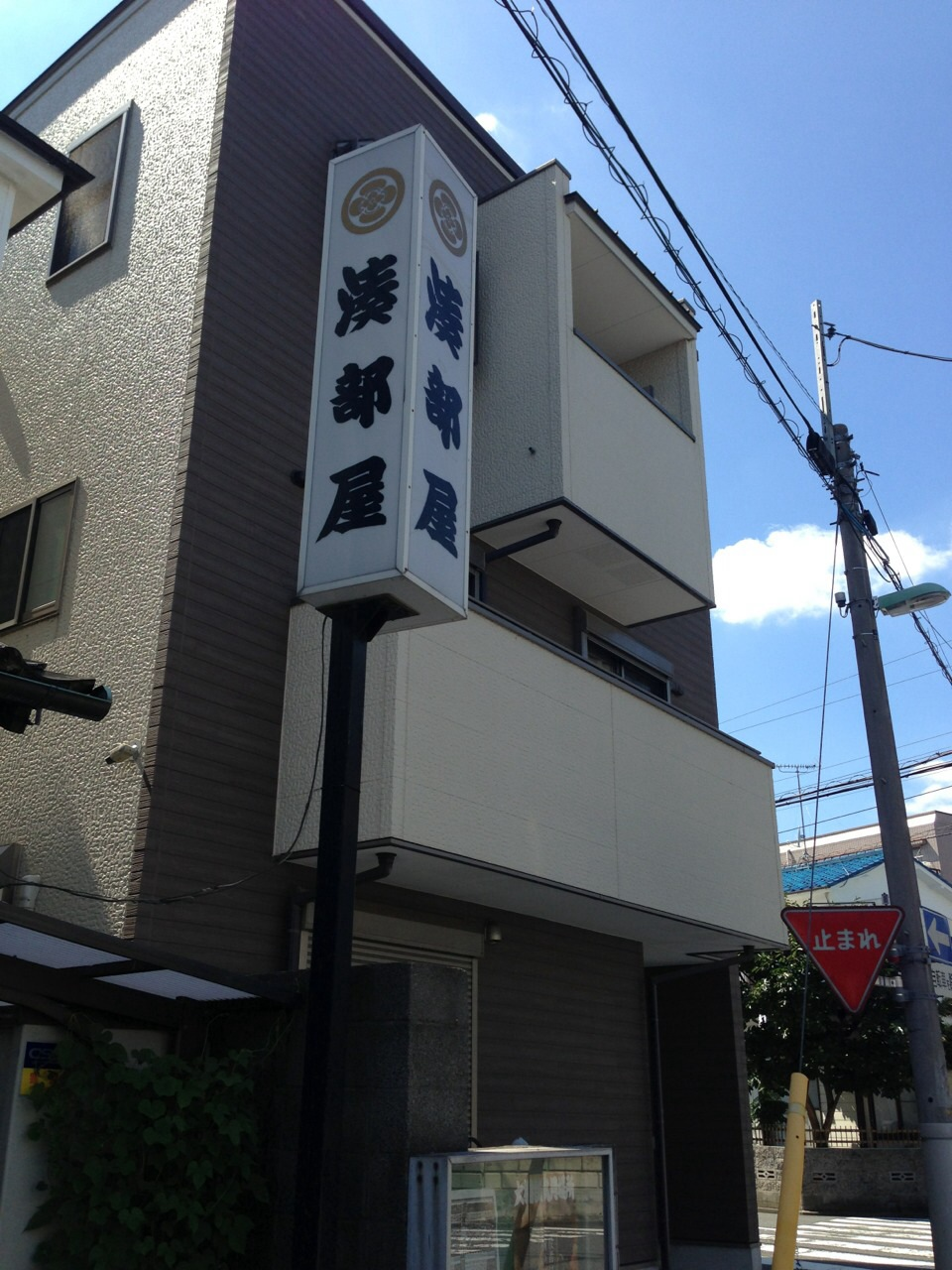

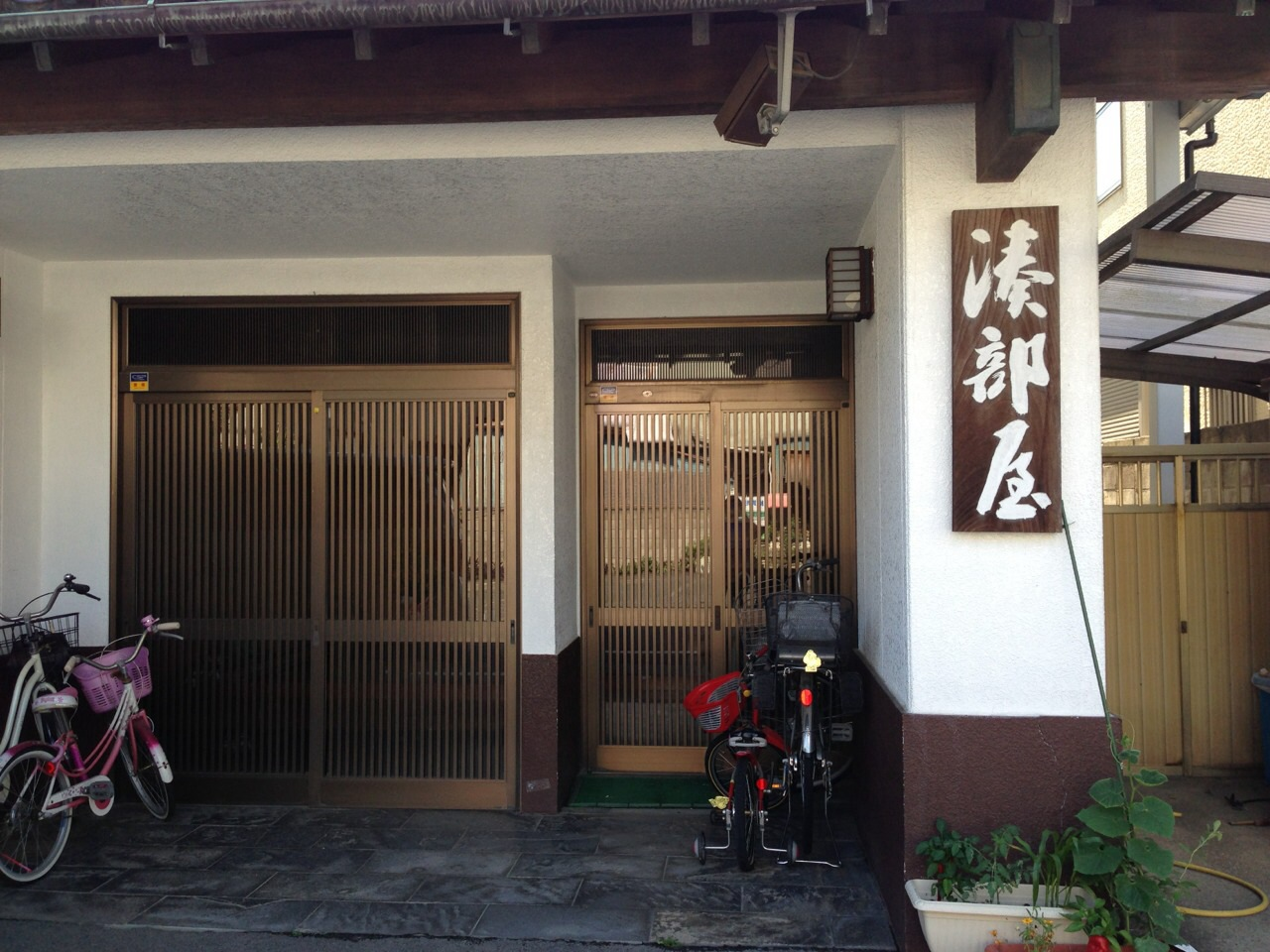

Minato stable (湊部屋, Minato-beya) is a stable of sumo wrestlers, part of the Nishonoseki ichimon, or group of stables.

As of May 2026, the stable has 9 active wrestlers.

== History ==
It was founded in 1982 by former komusubi Yutakayama Hiromitsu, who branched off from Tokitsukaze stable. The former Yutakayama studied at the Tokyo University of Agriculture, and due to his interest in academia his stable was the first to introduce a library on its premises. Until the arrival of Ichinojō, the stable had produced just one makuuchi-ranked wrestler, Minatofuji, who reached a highest rank of maegashira 2 in 1995 and later became a coach at the stable under the name Tatsutagawa.

In July 2010, Minato and Tatsutagawa swapped roles. In the same month, Chinese wrestler Nakanokuni earned promotion to the jūryō division. In December 2017, Minato left the Tokitsukaze ichimon, leaving the stable unaffiliated to any group. In September 2018, the stable joined the Nishonoseki ichimon.

In May 2014, Mongolian wrestler Ichinojō became the third wrestler from the stable to achieve sekitori status. In September of the same year, he reached the makuuchi division and, in just two tournaments, became Minato's most successful wrestler, achieving the rank of sekiwake for the November tournament. Despite a successful career and a top-division championship achieved in July 2022, the relationship between Ichinojō and his master Minato deteriorated, particularly after it was revealed that the wrestler had assaulted the okamisan in November 2022, also suggesting that Ichinojō had issues with alcoholism and had been disruptive at parties by drinking excessively. As a result, Ichinojō moved out of the stable building to live on his own in December 2021. After a Sumo Association investigation, it was ruled that Ichinojō's assault on the okamisan was not malicious and that issues concerning both their relations and alcoholism had been ruled out. It was also found that Ichinojō violated Sumo Association-imposed COVID rules by visiting restaurants on two separate occasions in November 2020 and August 2021 when wrestlers were not permitted to go out. As a result, Ichinojō was issued a one-tournament suspension (which was served in January 2023). Ichinojō's stablemaster was also issued a 20% salary reduction for three months. In May 2023, Ichinojō announced his retirement without resolving his relationship issues with his master, and his retirement ceremony took place without the participation of his stable.

In June 2025, the stable positioned itself to recruit Englishman Nicholas Tarasenko. Fighting under the shikona Eisei, Tarasenko made his debut at the July 2026 tournament, making him the third British-born wrestler to become a professional wrestler in the history of the sport.

== Ring name conventions ==
Many wrestlers at this stable take shikona, or ring name, that include the character for 'harbour' (湊), which is the first character in the stable name, and which is also in deference to stablemaster Minatofuji. It can be used as a prefix, as in Minatoryū and Minatoshō, or as a suffix, as in Hamaminato and Haruminato.

== Owners ==
- 2010–present: 23rd Minato (iin, former maegashira Minatofuji, born 1968)
- 1982–2010: 22nd Minato (komusubi Yutakayama, born 1947–2020)

== Notable active wrestlers ==
- none

== Notable former members ==
- Ichinojō (sekiwake, born 1993)
- Minatofuji (maegashira 2, born 1968)
- Nakanokuni (jūryō 12, born 1983)

== Referees ==
- Kimura Motoki (makuuchi gyōji, real name Hiromichi Okamura, born 1968)

== Hairdresser ==
- Tokosakura (fifth class tokoyama, born 2008)

== Location and access ==
Saitama Prefecture, Kawaguchi City, Shibanakata 2–20–10
15 minute walk from Warabi Station on Keihin Tōhoku Line

== See also ==
- List of sumo stables
- List of active sumo wrestlers
- List of past sumo wrestlers
- Glossary of sumo terms
