= Chiyonoumi Meitaro =

Japanese sumo wrestler

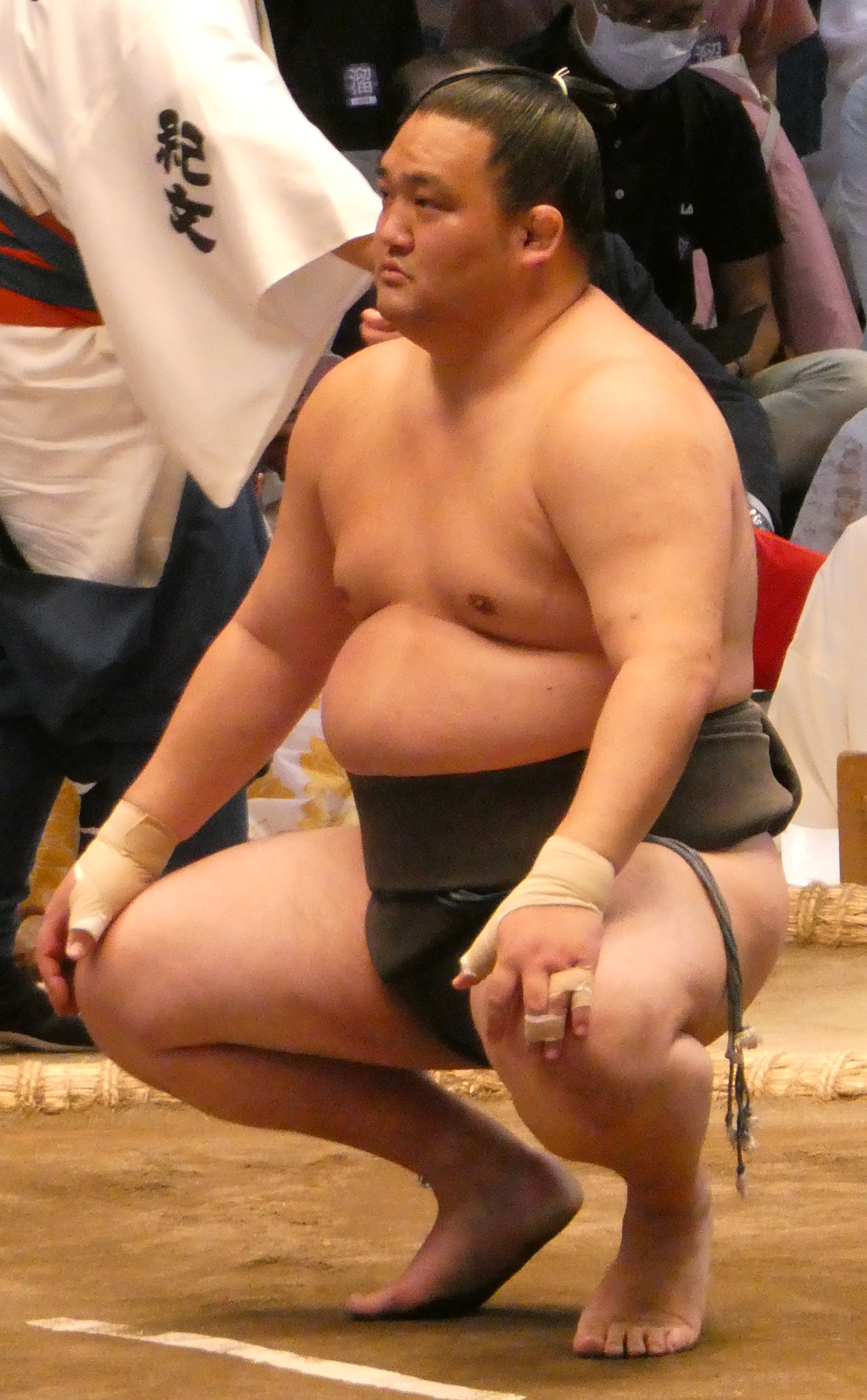

Personal information
- Born: Meitaro Hamamachi 濱町 明太郎; 11 January 1993 (age 33) Kochi
- Height: 181 cm (71 in)
- Weight: 140 kg (309 lb)

Sport
- Sport: Sumo
- University team: Nippon Sport Science University
- Retired: May 2024
- Heya: Kokonoe
- Record: 227-191-45
- Debut: May 2015
- Highest rank: Juryo 8
- Championships: 1 (Jonidan) 1 (Sandanme) 1 (Jonokuchi)

Chiyonoumi Meitaro (Japanese 千代の海 明太郎, born January 11, 1993 as Meitaro Hamamachi) is a Japanese former professional sumo wrestler from Kochi Prefecture. He debuted in May 2015 as a wrestler for Kokonoe stable and reached his highest rank of Juryo 8 in March 2019. He has won three yusho, one in Jonidan, one in Sandanme and one in Jonokuchi.

== Career ==
He was demoted from juryo after the July 2020 tournament. With the retirement of Tochiozan occurring in the same tournament, it left no sekitori from Kochi Prefecture which had had continuous representation in the top two divisions since Tosanoumi entered juryo in 1994.

In November 2021 he fought Ryuden for the makushita division championship with both men tied at 6-0, but he was defeated. Similarly in March 2022 he got to 6-0 but was defeated for the championship by Kinbozan.

In July 2023 he returned to juryo for the first time since the May 2021 tournament.

On June 3, 2024, he submitted his retirement notice to the Japan Sumo Association, which was accepted.

== Personal life ==
On April 29, 2021 Chiyonoumi married a 28 year old nurse who he had met in 2018. A wedding reception was not held due to the COVID-19 pandemic.

== Career record ==
Chiyonoumi Meitaro
Year	January Hatsu basho, Tokyo	March Haru basho, Osaka	May Natsu basho, Tokyo	July Nagoya basho, Nagoya	September Aki basho, Tokyo	November Kyūshū basho, Fukuoka
2015	x	x	(Maezumo)	West Jonokuchi #19; 7–0; Champion	West Jonidan #10; 7–0; Champion	East Sandanme #19; 4–3
2016	East Sandanme #9; 7–0; Champion	East Makushita #13; Sat out due to injury 0–0–7	West Makushita #53; Sat out due to injury 0–0–7	West Sandanme #33; Sat out due to injury 0–0–7	East Sandanme #94; 6–1	East Sandanme #36; 5–2
2017	East Sandanme #7; 6–1	East Makushita #32; 4–3	West Makushita #26; 4–3	East Makushita #22; 2–5	East Makushita #39; 5–2	West Makushita #27; 6–1
2018	East Makushita #10; 4–3	East Makushita #5; 5–2	West Makushita #1; 4–3	West Jūryō #12; 8–7	West Jūryō #11; 8–7	East Jūryō #11; 6–9
2019	West Jūryō #14; 8–5–2	West Jūryō #8; 7–8	West Jūryō #9; 7–8	East Jūryō #10; 6–9	West Jūryō #11; 2–13	East Makushita #6; 4–3
2020	West Makushita #3; 5–2	East Jūryō #13; 7–8	East Jūryō #14; Tournament Cancelled; 0–0–0	East Jūryō #14; 6–9	East Makushita #2; 4–3	West Jūryō #14; 9–6
2021	East Jūryō #11; Sat out due to COVID rules 0–0–15	East Jūryō #12; 7–8	East Jūryō #12; 4–11	East Makushita #3; Sat out due to injury 0–0–7	West Makushita #43; 4–3	East Makushita #33; 6–1
2022	East Makushita #13; 5–2	East Makushita #6; 6–1	East Makushita #1; 3–4	West Makushita #4; 3–4	West Makushita #6; 3–4	East Makushita #11; 4–3
2023	West Makushita #7; 4–3	East Makushita #5; 4–3	West Makushita #3; 4–3	West Jūryō #14; 4–11	East Makushita #4; 3–4	East Makushita #7; 4–3
2024	East Makushita #4; 2–6	West Makushita #11; 4–3	East Makushita #8; 0–5–2	West Makushita #43; Retired –	x	x
Record given as wins–losses–absences Top division champion Top division runner-up Retired Lower divisions Non-participation Sanshō key: F=Fighting spirit; O=Outstanding performance; T=Technique Also shown: ★=Kinboshi; P=Playoff(s); Divisions: Makuuchi — Jūryō — Makushita — Sandanme — Jonidan — Jonokuchi Makuuchi ranks: Yokozuna — Ōzeki — Sekiwake — Komusubi — Maegashira
