= Ichinojō Takashi =

Japanese sumo wrestler

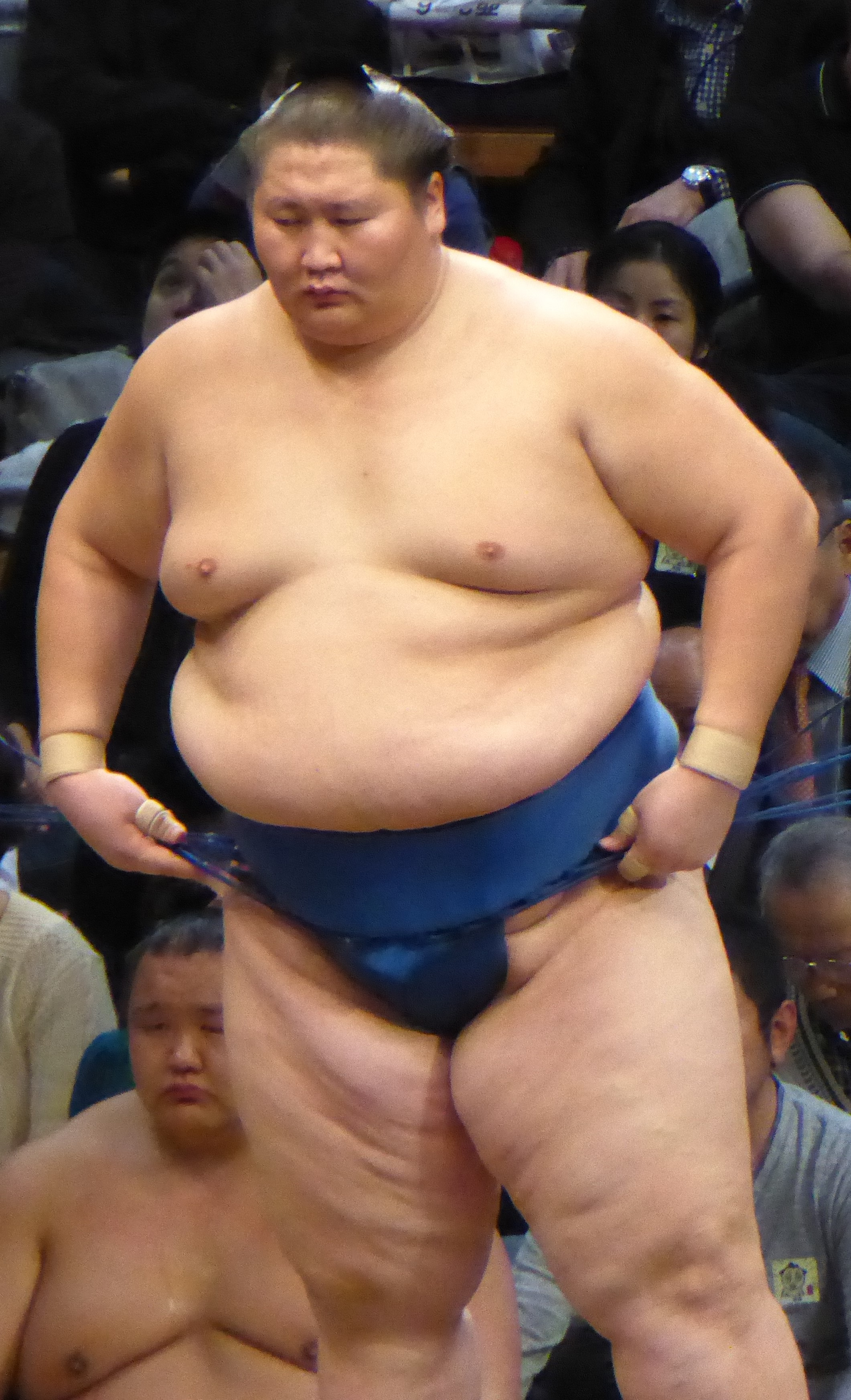
- Ichinojō in 2017

Personal information
- Native name: 逸ノ城 駿
- Born: Altankhuyag Ichinnorov; April 7, 1993 (age 33) Arkhangai, Mongolia
- Height: 1.90 m (6 ft 3 in)
- Weight: 212 kg (467 lb; 33.4 st)

Sport
- Sport: Sumo
- Retired: May 2023
- Heya: Minato
- Debut: January 2014
- Highest rank: Sekiwake (November 2014)
- Championships: 1 (Makuuchi); 2 (Jūryō)
- Special Prizes: Fighting Spirit (1); Outstanding Performance (3)
- Gold Stars: 9 Harumafuji (2); Hakuhō (1); Kakuryū (2); Kisenosato (3); Terunofuji (1)
- Updated on 4 May 2023

Ichinojō Takashi (Japanese: 逸ノ城 駿; born 7 April 1993 as Altankhuyag Ichinnorov (Mongolian: Алтанхуягийн Ичинноров)) is a former professional sumo wrestler from Arkhangai, Mongolia. He was the second foreign-born wrestler, and the first of non-Japanese descent allowed to debut at an elevated rank in the third makushita division of professional sumo due to his amateur sumo success. Wrestling for Minato stable, he took the second division jūryō championship in only his third professional tournament. In his fifth tournament, his first in the top makuuchi division, he was the runner-up and promoted all the way to sekiwake, his highest rank to date. Ichinojō acquired Japanese citizenship in September 2021, taking the name Miura Takashi (三浦 駿). He won the top division championship in July 2022. He was one of the heaviest rikishi in the top division as of September 2020. He retired from active competition in May 2023.

== Early life and sumo background ==
Ichinnorov is the first of all Mongolian wrestlers who have gone on to join Japanese professional sumo to come from a nomadic clan, as most of the Mongolians who preceded him have been city dwellers. From a young age he participated actively in bökh, traditional Mongolian wrestling, and at the age of 14 he took the championship in the bökh competition held in his province of Arkhangai. On moving to Japan, he was on the judo team at his high school in Tottori Prefecture but when the sumo coach at his school, Tottori Jōhoku High School, saw his ability he asked him to transfer to the sumo team. In his second and third years he collected a total of five amateur sumo titles. After graduating he was originally slated to join Minato stable which had no foreign wrestlers at the time (as only one foreign-born wrestler is allowed per stable) but he instead stayed on at his high school as a coach, and won a national amateur sumo title in 2013.

== Career ==
Ichinnorov started professional sumo with Minato stable by taking the physical examination for new wrestlers prior to the November 2013 honbasho or tournament, but as he had yet to procure his working visa, his entry to competition was postponed to the January 2014 tournament. With his previous amateur yokozuna title, he was allowed to debut at the high rank of makushita 15 in a system called makushita tsukedashi, the second foreign-born rikishi to ever achieve this status after Japanese-Brazilian Ryūdō. As no one else in his stable was ranked in the makushita division or higher, he automatically became the highest ranked wrestler in his stable on entering, a rare occurrence. His shikona Ichinojō uses his birth name for the sound of the first character ichi (逸), which means "outstanding talent", and the third character jō (城), meaning "castle", was taken from his high school (Jōhoku).

In his debut Ichinojō turned in an impressive 6–1 record, followed by another 6-1 record at makushita 3 in the following tournament. His record allowed him to make his debut in the salaried ranks of jūryō in only his third tournament. He debuted at jūryō 10 and managed an 11–4 record, which tied him with four other wrestlers. On the final day he won a four-man playoff to take the championship, with both his playoff wins being against wrestlers he had lost against during the regular tournament, Kotoyūki and Kagamiō.

Ichinojō defeating Okinoumi in the September 2014 honbasho.

He lost the July 2014 jūryō championship in a playoff with the former komusubi Tochinoshin who was returning from injury, but his 13–2 record from near the top of the second division was easily enough for promotion into the top makuuchi division. He had risen through the ranks so fast that he did not have time to grow his hair long enough to form the traditional chonmage that sekitori usually wear. In the subsequent September tournament Ichinojō defeated top division stalwarts and former san'yaku Tochiōzan, Shōhōzan, and Chiyoōtori before being handed his first loss on Day 7 by Ikioi. He continued winning the second week and was paired against increasingly higher-ranked opponents, beating two ōzeki and the yokozuna Kakuryū before falling to yokozuna Hakuhō in a match-up that required the governing body to forgo a normally planned match-up between san'yaku due to the threat of Ichinojō taking the championship from such a low rank. His final 13–2 record was good enough for runner-up, special prizes for Outstanding Performance and Fighting Spirit, and promotion to sekiwake for his second makuuchi and sixth overall professional tournament.

Ichinojō suffered somewhat from the stress of the attention that was heaped on him due to this impressive performance, entering the hospital with shingles a couple weeks before the next tournament and missing out on important training time. While not managing nearly as impressive a performance in the November tournament, he still returned a winning record to maintain his sekiwake rank for the start of 2015. A 6–9 record in January 2015 saw him relegated to the maegashira ranks but after nine wins in March, including a second career kinboshi or gold star for victory over the yokozuna Harumafuji, he was promoted to komusubi. Ichinojō regained his best rank of sekiwake after a winning record in the May tournament, which included a first win over Hakuhō on the opening day (he did not receive a gold star for this victory as only maegashira are eligible). He was unable to preserve his sekiwake rank in the next tournament however, scoring only 4–11 in July.

Ichinojō had a less successful year in 2016 when fighting the top ranked wrestlers, scoring only two wins at maegashira 3 in January and five wins at maegashira 2 in May (although he did earn his third kinboshi in the latter tournament with another defeat of Harumafuji.) He had to withdraw from a tournament from the first time in his career in September 2016, because of lower back pain. He scored eleven wins in January 2017, but from the low rank of maegashira 13. He scored 8–7 in September at maegashira 6, but did not defeat any san'yaku ranked wrestlers. He was promoted back to the sanyaku ranks in March 2018 at komusubi, and after a 9–6 performance he returned to the sekiwake rank in May for the first time since July 2015. He held the rank for four consecutive tournaments but his results were not particularly impressive and he dropped back to the maegashira ranks after a 6-9 in November.

Ichinojō began the January 2019 tournament in excellent form, defeating two yokozuna (Kakuryu and Kisenosato) and two ōzeki (Gōeidō and Takayasu) in the first five days but performances deteriorated and he managed to post only two further wins. In the March tournament Ichinojō employed a revised set of techniques, retreating and then using his height and strength to thrust or slap down his opponents. He won his first seven matches before losing to Tochinoshin on day 8, but in contrast to his January performance he maintained his form. He won his last seven bouts including victories over Gōeidō and Takayasu to end the tournament with 14 wins, making him the runner-up behind Hakuhō and earning him the prize for Outstanding Performance. He returned to sekiwake for the May 2019 tournament but missed Days 8 through 11 with right knee pain, finishing with a 5–7–3 record. Falling to the maegashira ranks for the July tournament, he defeated Hakuhō for the third time on Day 9 to earn his eighth kinboshi. He withdrew on Day 5 of the September 2019 tournament after suffering a right shoulder injury the previous day. He missed all of the November 2019 tournament due to a related back injury, which saw him fall to jūryō, where he stayed until September 2020.

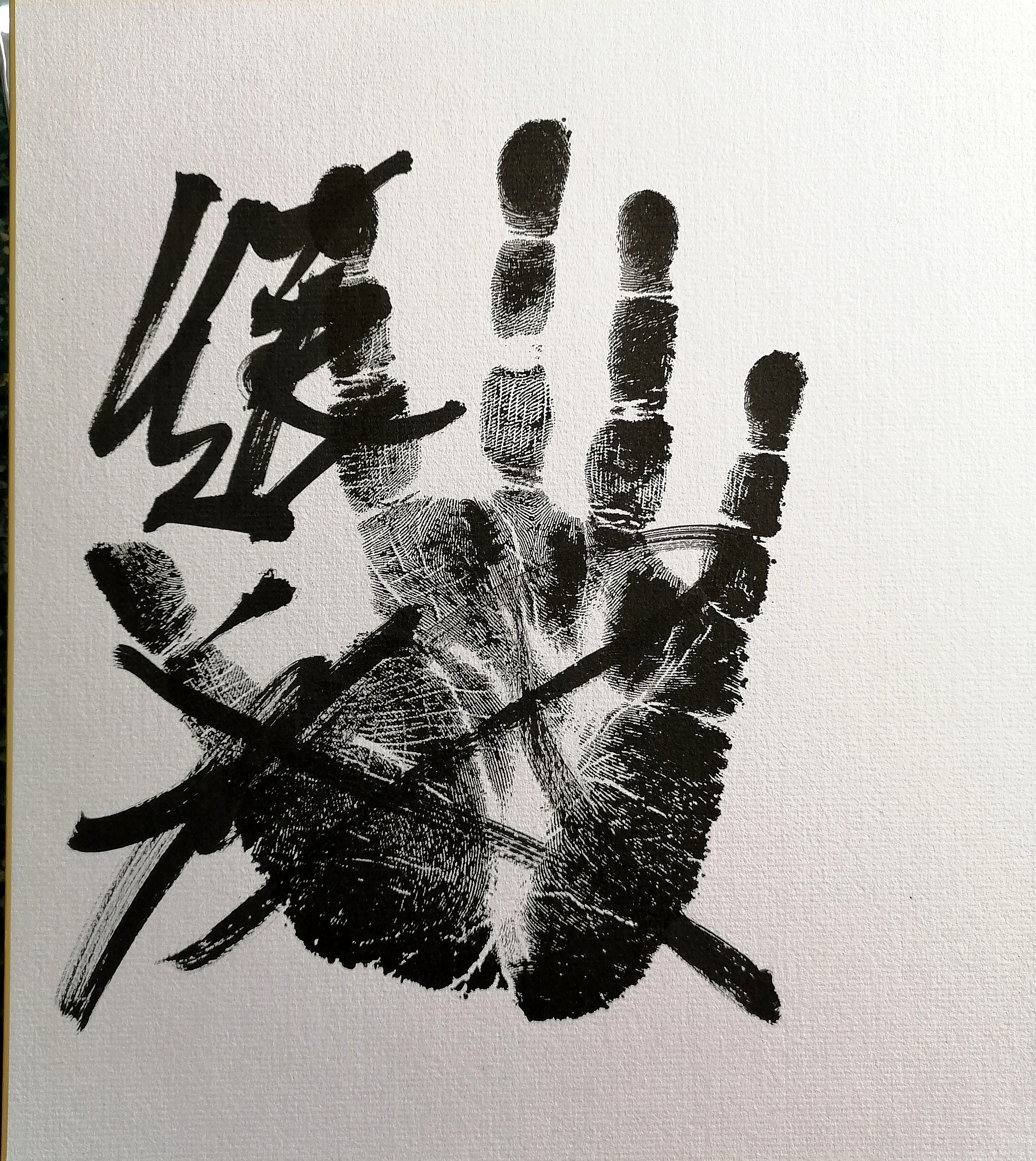
An Ichinojō tegata (handprint and signature)

In September 2021 Ichinojō returned to the san'yaku ranks at komusubi. This was the first time he had been ranked in san'yaku in 13 tournaments. Following the tournament, government records showed that he acquired Japanese citizenship, which is required in order to remain with the Japan Sumo Association as a coach after his retirement. His legal name is Miura Takashi, formed by taking the given name from his own shikona and the surname from his stablemaster's real name of Miura Takayuki.

Ichinojō was withdrawn from the May 2022 tournament after testing positive for COVID-19. (He had also tested positive in August 2021.) Returning in July just one maegashira rank lower than in May, he became the outright tournament leader with back to back wins on Days 4 and 5 over ōzeki Takakeishō and the yokozuna Terunofuji. This was his ninth kinboshi and first against Terunofuji. Entering the final day of the tournament, Ichinojō was tied with Terunofuji in points for the championship and needed to win his final day match against Ura to avoid the possibility of a 3-man playoff with Takakeishō or an outright loss to Terunofuji. Terunofuji went on to lose his head-to-head bout against Takakeishō in the final match and tie the ōzeki with matching 11-4 jun-yūshō records. This could have opened up the 3-way playoff possibility; however Ichinojō had already defeated Ura earlier in the day (as well as the de facto playoff wins on Days 4 and 5) to secure the decisive win number 12 and his first top division championship after eight years. For winning the Emperor's Cup at the rank of maegashira, he won a special prize, the Outstanding Performance award.

=== Assault allegations and COVID suspension ===
Ichinojō finished the November 2022 tournament with only four wins. During that tournament, the news magazine Shūkan Bunshun published a report that Ichinojō had assaulted the wife of his stablemaster Minato (former maegashira Minatofuji). After the allegations were published, Japanese news outlets quoted sources that suggested Ichinojō had issues with alcoholism and had been disruptive at parties by drinking excessively, resulting in a rift with his stablemaster. As a result, Ichinojō moved out of the stable building to live on his own in December 2021. According to sources, Ichinojō missed a day of practice in February 2022 and told his stablemaster that he couldn't wake up that day because he was too drunk.

At the conclusion of the November tournament, Kyodo News reported that Ichinojō was interviewed for about 30 minutes by executives of the Sumo Association. On 22 December 2022, the Sumo Association's compliance committee announced that they had interviewed Ichinojō and his stablemaster. Four days later, the Sumo Association's Board of Directors held an extraordinary meeting at the Ryōgoku Kokugikan to discuss the matter. Sumo Association spokesman Shibatayama (the 62nd yokozuna Ōnokuni) said that Ichinojō's assault on his stablemaster's wife had taken place more than five years ago, was not malicious, and that issues concerning both her and alcoholism had been ruled out. However, the board found that Ichinojō violated Sumo Association-imposed COVID-19 rules by visiting restaurants on two separate occasions in November 2020 and August 2021 when wrestlers were not permitted to go out.

The Sumo board issued Ichinojō a one-tournament suspension (which was served in January 2023) after considering mitigating circumstances that he expressed remorse for his actions when he was interviewed and that he only went out to the restaurants for a short period of time. This differs from the COVID-related circumstances surrounding other wrestlers such as Abi and Asanoyama, which resulted in longer suspensions. Ichinojō's stablemaster Minato was issued a 20% salary reduction for three months.

=== Return to competition and retirement ===
Ichinojō underwent an endoscopy in February 2023 to remove a herniated disc. A few weeks later, he told reporters that he intended to compete at the upcoming March tournament where he was ranked near the top of the second-highest jūryō division. In the March 2023 tournament he was able to win the jūryō championship with a 14-1 record, gaining promotion back to the top division for the May 2023 tournament.

Ichinojō unexpectedly announced his retirement from active competition soon after his promotion. In a press conference on 4 May 2023 he told reporters that he made the decision to retire because of lengthy lower back issues. He added that he was glad he did sumo wrestling, saying that winning a championship was his best moment. Despite having acquired Japanese citizenship he left the Sumo Association, choosing not remain in sumo as a coach.

Ichinojō began planning his retirement ceremony in November 2023 by telling Nikkan Sports that he would hold a ceremony on his own, rather than holding it in the more traditional way at the Ryōgoku Kokugikan. The ceremony was held at the Tobu Hotel Levant Tokyo in Sumida on 11 February 2024, with around 400 people taking part in the event. Having left the professional world on bad terms with his stablemaster, Ichinojō announced early on in the organization of the event that he was not thinking there would be any participation from members of Minato stable. However, several Mongolian personalities took part in the ceremony, including Ōzeki Kirishima and former yokozuna Kakuryū. Because of Ichinojō's bad relationship with his former master, the ceremony ended with Ishiura Tokiyoshi giving the final scissor strokes, because he is the principal of Ichinojō's former high school (Tottori Jōhoku High School) and his former mentor in the sumo club.

== Post-retirement activities ==
Ichinojō has revealed that in July 2023 he returned to his home country of Mongolia for about two months.

In 2025, he made his feature film acting debut in director Joe Cornet's The Wide West. Credited simply as "Ichi", he stars alongside former juryo wrestler Hishofuji Hiroki as sumo champions in the early 20th century who travel abroad to exhibit the sport in the United States. The film is very loosely inspired by Hitachiyama Taniemon's 1907 sumo deputation to the US.

== Fighting style ==
Ichinojō preferred grappling techniques (yotsu-zumō) over pushing and thrusting (oshi-zumō). His preferred grip on his opponent′s belt (mawashi) was migi-yotsu, a right hand inside, left hand outside position. His most common winning kimarite in his career was yorikiri, or front force out, which accounted for 44% of his victories. After reaching around 215 kg (474 lb) he became less mobile and more injury-prone. He had been troubled by back pain throughout his career starting 2016. After missing the entire September 2016 tournament with a herniated disc, he made an effort to lose weight and got down to 185 kg (408 lb) which was the same weight at which he entered professional sumo. His weight continued to fluctuate over his career, increasing to 227 kg (500 lb) by September 2018, then falling again to 198 kg (437 lb) by January 2021. In March 2023 he was 219 kg (483 lb), making him the heaviest active sekitori.

== Career record ==
Ichinojō Takashi
Year	January Hatsu basho, Tokyo	March Haru basho, Osaka	May Natsu basho, Tokyo	July Nagoya basho, Nagoya	September Aki basho, Tokyo	November Kyūshū basho, Fukuoka
2014	Makushita tsukedashi #15; 6–1	West Makushita #3; 6–1	West Jūryō #10; 11–4–PP; Champion	West Jūryō #3; 13–2–P	East Maegashira #10; 13–2 ★FO	West Sekiwake #1; 8–7
2015	West Sekiwake #1; 6–9	West Maegashira #1; 9–6 ★	West Komusubi #1; 8–7	West Sekiwake #1; 4–11	East Maegashira #4; 9–6	East Maegashira #1; 6–9
2016	East Maegashira #3; 2–13	East Maegashira #11; 11–4	West Maegashira #2; 5–10 ★	East Maegashira #7; 9–6	West Maegashira #3; Sat out due to injury 0–0–15	West Maegashira #13; 7–8
2017	West Maegashira #13; 11–4	East Maegashira #7; 6–9	East Maegashira #9; 8–7	East Maegashira #6; 7–8	East Maegashira #6; 8–7	West Maegashira #4; 10–5 ★
2018	West Maegashira #1; 10–5 ★	East Komusubi #1; 9–6	West Sekiwake #1; 8–7	East Sekiwake #1; 8–7	West Sekiwake #1; 8–7	West Sekiwake #1; 6–9
2019	West Maegashira #1; 6–9 ★★	West Maegashira #4; 14–1; O	East Sekiwake #1; 5–7–3	West Maegashira #4; 9–6 ★	East Maegashira #2; 1–4–10	East Maegashira #12; Sat out due to injury 0–0–15
2020	East Jūryō #7; 6–9	West Jūryō #8; 9–6	West Jūryō #5; Tournament Cancelled; State of Emergency; 0–0–0	West Jūryō #5; 9–6	East Maegashira #17; 8–7	West Maegashira #13; 8–7
2021	East Maegashira #12; 9–6	West Maegashira #6; 7–8	West Maegashira #6; 9–6	West Maegashira #2; 10–5	West Komusubi #1; 8–7	East Komusubi #1; 5–10
2022	West Maegashira #2; 8–7	East Maegashira #2; 9–6	West Maegashira #1; Sat out due to COVID rules 0–0–15	West Maegashira #2; 12–3 ★O	West Komusubi #1; 6–9	West Maegashira #2; 4–11
2023	East Maegashira #7; Suspended; 0–0–15	East Jūryō #3; 14–1; Champion	West Maegashira #13; Retired –	x	x	x
Record given as wins–losses–absences Top division champion Top division runner-up Retired Lower divisions Non-participation Sanshō key: F=Fighting spirit; O=Outstanding performance; T=Technique Also shown: ★=Kinboshi; P=Playoff(s); Divisions: Makuuchi — Jūryō — Makushita — Sandanme — Jonidan — Jonokuchi Makuuchi ranks: Yokozuna — Ōzeki — Sekiwake — Komusubi — Maegashira

== See also ==
- Glossary of sumo terms
- List of past sumo wrestlers
- List of Mongolian sumo wrestlers
- List of non-Japanese sumo wrestlers
- List of sumo record holders
- List of heaviest sumo wrestlers
- List of sumo top division champions
- List of sumo top division runners-up
- List of sumo second division champions
- List of sekiwake
