= Shimanoumi Kōyō =

Japanese sumo wrestler

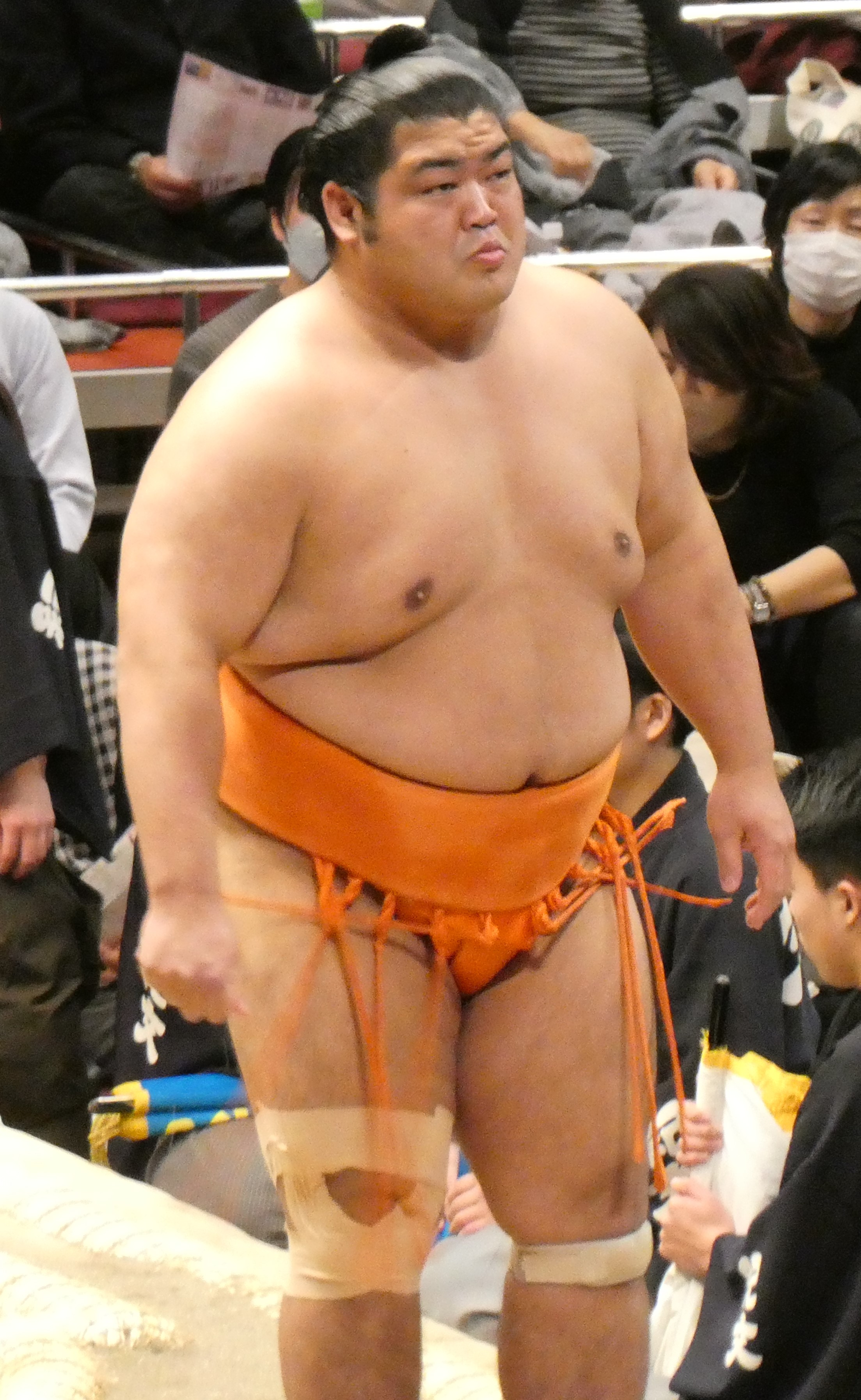
- Shimanoumi in 2022

Personal information
- Native name: 志摩ノ海 航洋
- Born: Kōyō Hamaguchi; July 11, 1989 (age 37) Shima, Mie, Japan
- Height: 1.79 m (5 ft 10 1/2 in)
- Weight: 151 kg (333 lb)

Sport
- Sport: Sumo
- Rank: see below
- University team: Kinki University
- Heya: Kise stable
- Debut: May 2012
- Highest rank: Maegashira 3 (March, 2021)
- Championships: 2 juryo 1 sandanme 1 jonidan 1 jonokuchi
- Special Prizes: 2 Fighting Spirit
- Updated on 26 November 2023

Shimanoumi Kōyō (志摩ノ海 航洋; born July 11, 1989 as Kōyō Hamaguchi (濱口 航洋, Hamaguchi Kōyō) and known after his marriage as Kōyō Fukuzono (福薗 航洋, Fukuzono Kōyō)) is a Japanese professional sumo wrestler from Shima, Mie. He debuted in sumo wrestling in July 2012 and made his makuuchi debut in May 2019. His highest rank has been maegashira 3. He wrestles for Kise stable.

== Background ==
Hamaguchi Kōyō began sumo in elementary school and also practiced at a local sumo wrestling school. He also played baseball but chose to concentrate on sumo in his third year at Watsugu Junior High School. He was scouted by several professional sumo stables but was not recruited and chose to continue his education. He attended Meitoku Yoshitsune High School before studying Business Administration at Kinki University. He was part of the university's successful sumo team but made little impact at national level in individual competition.

== Career ==
=== Early career ===
After graduating from university, he entered the Kise stable to prepare for a career in professional sumo. Like most new recruits he initially used his family name as his shikona and began his career as Hamaguchi. On his debut tournament (basho) in July 2012 he won all seven of his regular matches in the jonokuchi division but lost the championship in a play-off against his stablemate Iwasaki. He was promoted to jonidan for September and replicated his previous performance as he lost the play-off to Iwasaki after winning all seven of his bouts.

On Hamaguchi's debut in the fourth sandanme division in November 2012 he won four of his seven bouts to record a winning score or kachi-koshi. In the following tournament in January he was undefeated in seven matches to win the divisional championship (yusho) and secure promotion to the third, makushita level. Hamaguchi had winning records in his first two tournaments in makushita and in July he won two of his first three matches before losing to Chiyomaru. In the latter bout he sustained a serious injury to the anterior cruciate ligament and was forced to withdraw from the tournament. The injury was so severe that Hamaguchi was forced to sit out the next five basho and was relegated back to the lowest division.

In July 2014 Hamaguchi returned in the jonokuchi division and took the championship with a 7–0 record. Two months later he went undefeated in jonidan to win his second successive yusho. A 6–1 result in sandanme saw him promoted back to makushita in January 2015. He quickly established himself in the upper ranks of the division and in January 2016 he was narrowly denied a yusho when he was beaten in a play-off by his stablemate Ura. Winning records in the next two tournaments saw him promoted to the second juryo division for the first time for the July 2016 tournament. On his promotion he adopted the shikona Shimanoumi, which combines the name of his home town with the kanji for sea or ocean.

Shimanoumi's first appearance in juryo ended in failure as he won only four of his fifteen matches and was relegated back to makushita. Competing towards the top of the third division for the rest of 2016 and throughout 2017 he performed consistently before a 5–2 result in January 2018 secured his second promotion to juryo. He had mixed results in his next five tournaments and for the January 2019 basho he was ranked at juryo 13. Shimanoumi dominated the tournament, winning the yusho with a 13–2 record which included wins over Arawashi, Toyonoshima, Sokokurai, Ishiura, Takekaze and Chiyomaru. His success was not enough to secure promotion to the top makuuchi division but did see him ranked at juryo 1 in March. Needing only eight wins for promotion Shimanoumi exceeded his target as he repeated his 13–2 result from January and became the first wrestler since Tochinoshin in 2014 to win back-to-back juryo championships. His defeated opponents included Daishomaru, Kotoyuki, Daiamami, Kyokutaisei and Yutakayama.

=== Makuuchi career ===
Shimanoumi made his first appearance in the top division in May 2019 at the rank of maegashira 12. He struggled early in the tournament winning only two of his first six matches and by the end of day 9 he had a record of 4–5. In the second week of the basho he showed considerable improvement and won his last six bouts including wins over Yoshikaze, Kotoeko and Takarafuji. His 10–5 record saw him awarded the special prize for fighting spirit. Promoted to maegashira 6 for the July 2019 tournament he recorded an 8–7 result, securing his kachi-koshi with an uwatedashinage win over Aoiyama on day 14. He then found life in makuuchi more difficult, recording only one kachi-koshi in the next six tournaments, and he had fallen to the very bottom of the division at maegashira 17 by November 2020. He responded by mounting a challenge for the championship, sharing the lead with ōzeki Takakeishō with just a single loss after Day 12. He lost his final three matches to finish with an 11–4 record, but he received his second Fighting Spirit prize.

Having been relegated to the jūryō division, Shimanoumi wrestled in this division for the whole of 2023. At the November tournament of that year, he faced Mitoryū in a match that lasted a total of 5 minutes and 57 seconds and was notably marked by a rare mizu-iri (water break), the first in the jūryō division in 24 years.

== Fighting style ==
Shimanoumi has shown a preference for tsuki and oshi techniques which involve pushing and thrusting rather than grasping his opponent's mawashi or belt. His most common kimarite or winning move is oshidashi, the push-out.

== Personal life ==
In December 2021 Shimanoumi announced his engagement to Sayaka Fukuzono, a former Takarazuka Revue singer who performed under the name of Chihana Amasaki and the eldest daughter of the late former sekiwake (and former head of the Izutsu stable) Sakahoko. They were married on 19 June 2022 and welcomed a daughter in November 2023. In July 2022, Shimanoumi changed his legal surname to Fukuzono.

== Career record ==
Shimanoumi Kōyō
Year	January Hatsu basho, Tokyo	March Haru basho, Osaka	May Natsu basho, Tokyo	July Nagoya basho, Nagoya	September Aki basho, Tokyo	November Kyūshū basho, Fukuoka
2012	x	x	(Maezumō)	West Jonokuchi #16; 7–0–P	West Jonidan #10; 7–0–P	East Sandanme #18; 4–3
2013	East Sandanme #7; 7–0; Champion	East Makushita #12; 4–3	East Makushita #8; 5–2	West Makushita #4; 2–3–2	West Makushita #16; Sat out due to injury 0–0–7	West Makushita #56; Sat out due to injury 0–0–7
2014	East Sandanme #37; Sat out due to injury 0–0–7	East Sandanme #98; Sat out due to injury 0–0–7	West Jonidan #58; Sat out due to injury 0–0–7	East Jonokuchi #18; 7–0; Champion	East Jonidan #13; 7–0; Champion	West Sandanme #22; 6–1
2015	East Makushita #45; 6–1	East Makushita #19; 5–2	East Makushita #11; 4–3	West Makushita #8; 3–4	West Makushita #13; 4–3	West Makushita #9; 3–4
2016	East Makushita #18; 6–1	West Makushita #7; 4–3	East Makushita #5; 4–3	West Jūryō #14; 4–11	East Makushita #7; 4–3	East Makushita #5; 2–5
2017	East Makushita #13; 4–3	East Makushita #9; 5–2	West Makushita #5; 5–2	West Makushita #2; 3–4	West Makushita #5; 5–2	West Makushita #3; 4–3
2018	West Makushita #2; 5–2	West Jūryō #11; 9–6	West Jūryō #7; 7–8	East Jūryō #8; 7–8	East Jūryō #9; 5–10	East Jūryō #14; 9–6
2019	East Jūryō #11; 13–2; Champion	East Jūryō #1; 13–2; Champion	East Maegashira #12; 10–5; F	West Maegashira #6; 8–7	East Maegashira #6; 5–10	East Maegashira #10; 6–9
2020	West Maegashira #14; 6–9	West Maegashira #16; 9–6	East Maegashira #11; Tournament Cancelled; State of Emergency; 0–0–0	East Maegashira #11; 5–10	East Maegashira #15; 6–9	East Maegashira #17; 11–4; F
2021	East Maegashira #10; 9–6	West Maegashira #3; 4–11	East Maegashira #9; 7–8	West Maegashira #9; 8–7	East Maegashira #7; 8–7	East Maegashira #6; 5–10
2022	West Maegashira #9; 5–6–4	East Maegashira #10; 8–7	East Maegashira #8; 7–8	East Maegashira #9; 1–14	East Jūryō #1; 4–11	East Jūryō #8; 7–8
2023	East Jūryō #8; 5–10	East Jūryō #11; 5–10	West Jūryō #13; 8–7	West Jūryō #10; 5–10	East Jūryō #12; 7–8	East Jūryō #12; 9–6
2024	East Jūryō #8; 6–9	East Jūryō #9; 5–10	East Jūryō #11; 9–6	East Jūryō #6; 8–7	East Jūryō #4; 6–9	West Jūryō #4; 7–8
2025	East Jūryō #5; 3–12	West Jūryō #10; 8–7	East Jūryō #8; 5–10	East Jūryō #12; 3–12	West Makushita #4; 2–5	East Makushita #11; 5–2
2026	East Makushita #7; 4–3	East Makushita #5; 4–3	West Makushita #2; 0–7	West Makushita #32; 5–2	West Makushita #19; 3–4	East Makushita #21; 2–5
Record given as wins–losses–absences Top division champion Top division runner-up Retired Non-participation Jūryō Lower divisions Sanshō key: F=Fighting spirit; O=Outstanding performance; T=Technique Also shown: ★=Kinboshi; P=Playoff(s); Divisions: Makuuchi — Jūryō — Makushita — Sandanme — Jonidan — Jonokuchi Makuuchi ranks: Yokozuna — Ōzeki — Sekiwake — Komusubi — Maegashira

== See also ==
- Glossary of sumo terms
- List of active sumo wrestlers
- List of active special prize winners
- List of sumo second division champions
