= Minatofuji Takayuki =

Japanese sumo wrestler

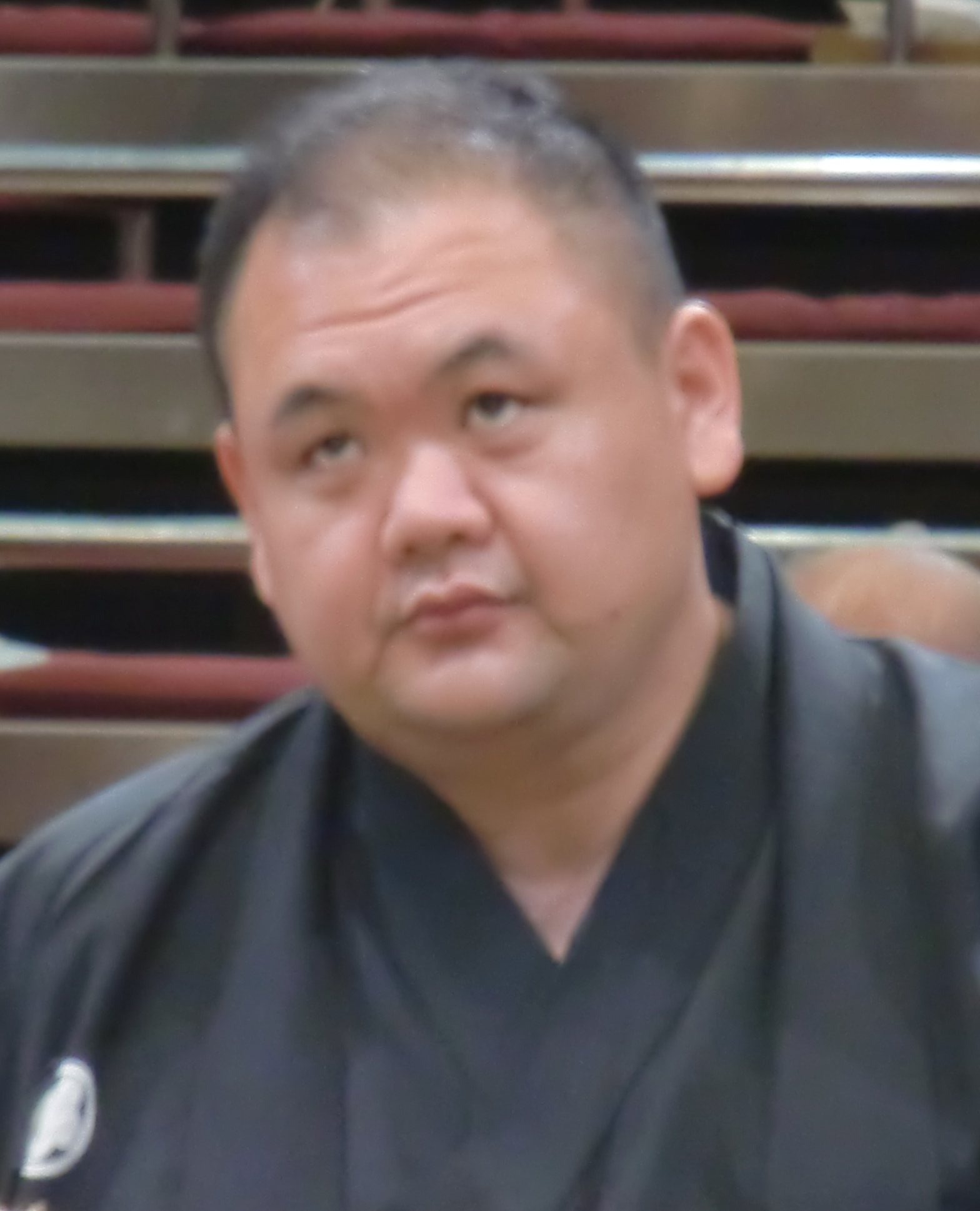
- Minatofuji in May 2010

Personal information
- Native name: 湊富士 孝行
- Born: Takayuki Miura; 6 July 1968 (age 58) Annaka, Gunma, Japan
- Height: 1.86 m (6 ft 1 in)
- Weight: 161 kg (355 lb)

Sport
- Sport: Sumo
- Retired: September, 2002
- Heya: Minato
- Record: 601-631-41
- Debut: March, 1984
- Highest rank: Maegashira 2 (September, 1995)
- Elder name: Minato
- Championships: 1 (Jūryō)
- Special Prizes: Fighting Spirit (1)
- Gold Stars: 3 Takanohana II (2); Musashimaru
- Updated on Sep. 2012

Minatofuji Takayuki (Japanese: 湊富士 孝行; born 6 July 1968 as Takayuki Miura (三浦孝行)) is a Japanese former professional sumo wrestler from Annaka, Gunma. He made his professional debut in March 1984, and his highest rank was maegashira 2. He retired in 2002, and in 2010 became the head coach of Minato stable.

== Career ==
At junior high school he was a member of the judo club but also practiced sumo at the Takasaki city's Tokyo Agricultural University High School, where he was advised to join Minato stable by a supervisor there. He was also inspired to give sumo a try by the example of fellow Gunma Prefecture native Tochiakagi, who in 1977 had become the first wrestler from the prefecture to reach the top division in 65 years. He was given the shikona of Minatofuji immediately and fought his first bout in March 1984. He reached sekitori status for the first time in January 1992 upon promotion to the jūryō division. He was the first member of Minato stable to become a sekitori. He won the jūryō division yusho or tournament championship in May 1993 with a 12-3 record and was promoted to the top makuuchi division for the following tournament in July 1993. His highest rank was maegashira 2, which he reached in September 1995. He won his only sansho, or special prize for Fighting Spirit in November 1995. He earned three kinboshi or gold stars for defeating yokozuna, two against Takanohana in January and May 1998 and one against Musashimaru in September 1999. He fought in the top division for 46 tournaments but never managed to reach the sanyaku ranks or score better than 9-6 in a tournament. His win/loss record in makuuchi was 302 wins against 371 losses with 17 absences. He was relatively injury-free until late in his career when an ankle problem caused him pull out of the March 2000 tournament. The injury continued to trouble him and contributed to his demotion to the jūryō division after the March 2001 tournament.

== Retirement from sumo ==
Minatofuji retired in September 2002, and had his danpatsu-shiki or official retirement ceremony in September 2003. He became an elder of the Japan Sumo Association under the name Tatsutagawa (which he purchased from the former Shikishima) and in 2010 took over the running of Minato stable from his former stablemaster, ex-komusubi Yutakayama Hiromitsu, who was approaching the mandatory retirement age. He is now known as Minato Oyakata. He is a judge of tournament bouts, and in September 2013 suffered a fractured ankle when a wrestler fell from the dohyo and landed on him.

In December 2020, he tested positive for COVID-19.

In December 2022 the Sumo Association issued Minatofuji a 20% salary cut for three months after it was discovered that a member of his stable, Ichinojō, violated COVID rules by visiting restaurants in November 2020 and August 2021 when sumo wrestlers were not permitted to go out.

== Fighting style ==
The softness of his physique was noted by Konishiki, who nicknamed him "Marshmallow Man". This and the strength of his legs enabled him to absorb his opponent's charge and counter-attack with pushes and thrusts (tsuki/oshi). When fighting on the mawashi he used a migi-yotsu grip and his favourite technique was shitatenage (underarm throw).

== Personal life ==
Minatofuji was married in 2001 to a physician from Fukushima Prefecture. They met at Saitama Medical University, where she was a graduate student and he happened to be visiting the hospital to see a fellow wrestler (Daishi) who was receiving treatment. Since he took over Minato stable in 2010 she helps him run the stable as an okamisan. She is known to aid the wrestlers' recuperation after training by giving them massages. The couple have two children.

== Career record ==
Minatofuji Takayuki
Year	January Hatsu basho, Tokyo	March Haru basho, Osaka	May Natsu basho, Tokyo	July Nagoya basho, Nagoya	September Aki basho, Tokyo	November Kyūshū basho, Fukuoka
1984	x	(Maezumo)	East Jonokuchi #43; 5–2	East Jonidan #125; 2–5	East Jonokuchi #14; 4–3	West Jonidan #112; 4–3
1985	West Jonidan #86; 5–2	East Jonidan #48; 4–3	West Jonidan #24; 5–2	East Sandanme #87; 2–5	East Jonidan #27; 3–4	West Jonidan #39; 5–2
1986	West Sandanme #100; 4–3	West Sandanme #77; 4–3	East Sandanme #54; 1–6	West Jonidan #1; 5–2	West Sandanme #64; 4–3	West Sandanme #45; Sat out due to injury 0–0–7
1987	West Sandanme #95; 2–5	West Jonidan #18; 6–1	East Sandanme #59; 4–3	West Sandanme #43; 4–3	East Sandanme #25; 5–2	West Makushita #56; 2–5
1988	East Sandanme #22; 6–1	East Makushita #47; 2–5	West Sandanme #11; 3–4	West Sandanme #27; 6–1	East Makushita #50; 4–3	West Makushita #40; 5–2
1989	East Makushita #21; 3–4	East Makushita #28; 5–2	East Makushita #14; 5–2	West Makushita #7; 3–4	West Makushita #11; 4–3	West Makushita #4; 4–3
1990	East Makushita #4; 2–2–3	West Makushita #17; Sat out due to injury 0–0–7	West Makushita #17; 4–3	East Makushita #12; 4–3	East Makushita #7; 3–4	West Makushita #11; 3–4
1991	East Makushita #17; 4–3	East Makushita #10; 5–2	West Makushita #3; 4–3	East Makushita #2; 3–4	East Makushita #7; 5–2	West Makushita #1; 4–3
1992	West Jūryō #13; 5–10	West Makushita #3; 4–3	East Makushita #2; 6–1	East Jūryō #10; 8–7	East Jūryō #8; 6–9	East Jūryō #11; 8–7
1993	West Jūryō #8; 6–9	West Jūryō #11; 9–6	East Jūryō #8; 12–3; Champion	East Maegashira #15; 9–6	East Maegashira #8; 5–10	East Maegashira #15; 7–8
1994	West Jūryō #2; 8–7	East Jūryō #2; 10–5	East Maegashira #15; 9–6	East Maegashira #9; 6–9	West Maegashira #15; 8–7	East Maegashira #10; 6–9
1995	East Maegashira #14; 8–7	East Maegashira #11; 8–7	West Maegashira #6; 6–9	East Maegashira #10; 8–7	East Maegashira #2; 5–10	West Maegashira #5; 8–7; F
1996	West Maegashira #3; 4–11	East Maegashira #9; 9–6	West Maegashira #2; 6–9	West Maegashira #4; 5–10	East Maegashira #7; 6–9	West Maegashira #12; 9–6
1997	West Maegashira #9; 6–9	East Maegashira #14; 8–7	East Maegashira #12; 8–7	West Maegashira #7; 7–8	East Maegashira #9; 7–8	West Maegashira #12; 9–6
1998	East Maegashira #6; 6–9 ★	East Maegashira #9; 8–7	East Maegashira #4; 4–11 ★	East Maegashira #10; 9–6	West Maegashira #2; 3–12	West Maegashira #9; 8–7
1999	East Maegashira #4; 5–10	East Maegashira #6; 6–9	East Maegashira #9; 8–7	West Maegashira #4; 7–8	West Maegashira #5; 6–9 ★	East Maegashira #7; 7–8
2000	West Maegashira #9; 8–7	East Maegashira #4; 2–11–2	West Maegashira #9; Sat out due to injury 0–0–15	West Maegashira #9; 7–8	West Maegashira #11; 6–9	West Maegashira #13; 8–7
2001	West Maegashira #11; 6–9	East Maegashira #14; 6–9	East Jūryō #3; 10–5	East Maegashira #15; 5–10	East Jūryō #6; 6–9	East Jūryō #10; 8–7
2002	East Jūryō #8; 7–8	West Jūryō #8; 6–9	East Jūryō #11; 6–9	West Jūryō #13; 3–12	West Makushita #11; Retired; 0–0–5	x
Record given as wins–losses–absences Top division champion Top division runner-up Retired Lower divisions Non-participation Sanshō key: F=Fighting spirit; O=Outstanding performance; T=Technique Also shown: ★=Kinboshi; P=Playoff(s); Divisions: Makuuchi — Jūryō — Makushita — Sandanme — Jonidan — Jonokuchi Makuuchi ranks: Yokozuna — Ōzeki — Sekiwake — Komusubi — Maegashira

== See also ==
- Glossary of sumo terms
- List of past sumo wrestlers
- List of sumo elders
- List of sumo tournament second division champions
